= Franklin Street =

Franklin Street may refer to:

Australia

- Franklin Street, Adelaide

Canada

- Franklin Street (Victoria, BC), named after Lumley Franklin

United States

- Franklin Street (Baltimore), Maryland
- Franklin Street (Boston), Massachusetts
- Franklin Street (Chapel Hill), North Carolina
- Franklin Street (Chicago), Illinois, intersects with Wacker Drive
- Franklin Street (Manhattan), New York, home of the New York Academy of Art
- Franklin Street (Portland, Maine)
- Franklin Street (Richmond), Virginia

Other uses:

- Franklin Street station (Pennsylvania) in Reading, Pennsylvania, USA
- Franklin Street station (IRT Broadway–Seventh Avenue Line), a New York City Subway station
- Franklin Street station (IRT Ninth Avenue Line), a former New York City elevated station
- Franklin Street station (IRT Sixth Avenue Line), a former New York City elevated station
- Franklin Street station (Wisconsin), a former Milwaukee Road station in Madison, Wisconsin
- Franklin Street Terminal, a former Chicago "L" station
- Franklin Street Bridge, in Chicago
- Franklin Street Park, in Cambridge, Massachusetts
- Franklin Street Presbyterian Church and Parsonage, in Baltimore

== See also ==
- Franklin Avenue (disambiguation)
