= Madison station =

Madison station may refer to:

- Madison station (CTA), a former elevated station of the CTA system in Chicago
- Madison station (Connecticut), a train station serving Shore Line East in Madison, Connecticut
- Madison station (Florida), a former train station serving Amtrak in Madison, Florida
- Madison station (Kansas), a former train station serving the AT&SF in Madison, Kansas
- Madison station (New Jersey), a train station serving New Jersey Transit in Madison, New Jersey
- Madison station (South Dakota), a former train station serving the Milwaukee Road in Madison, South Dakota
- A series of train stations in Madison, Wisconsin
  - Madison station (C&NW), serving the Chicago and North Western
  - Madison station (Milwaukee Road), serving the Milwaukee Road in West Madison
  - Franklin Street station (Wisconsin), serving the Milwaukee Road in East Madison
- Madison Station, predecessor to Madison, Mississippi
