= Duplainville, Wisconsin =

- Neighborhood
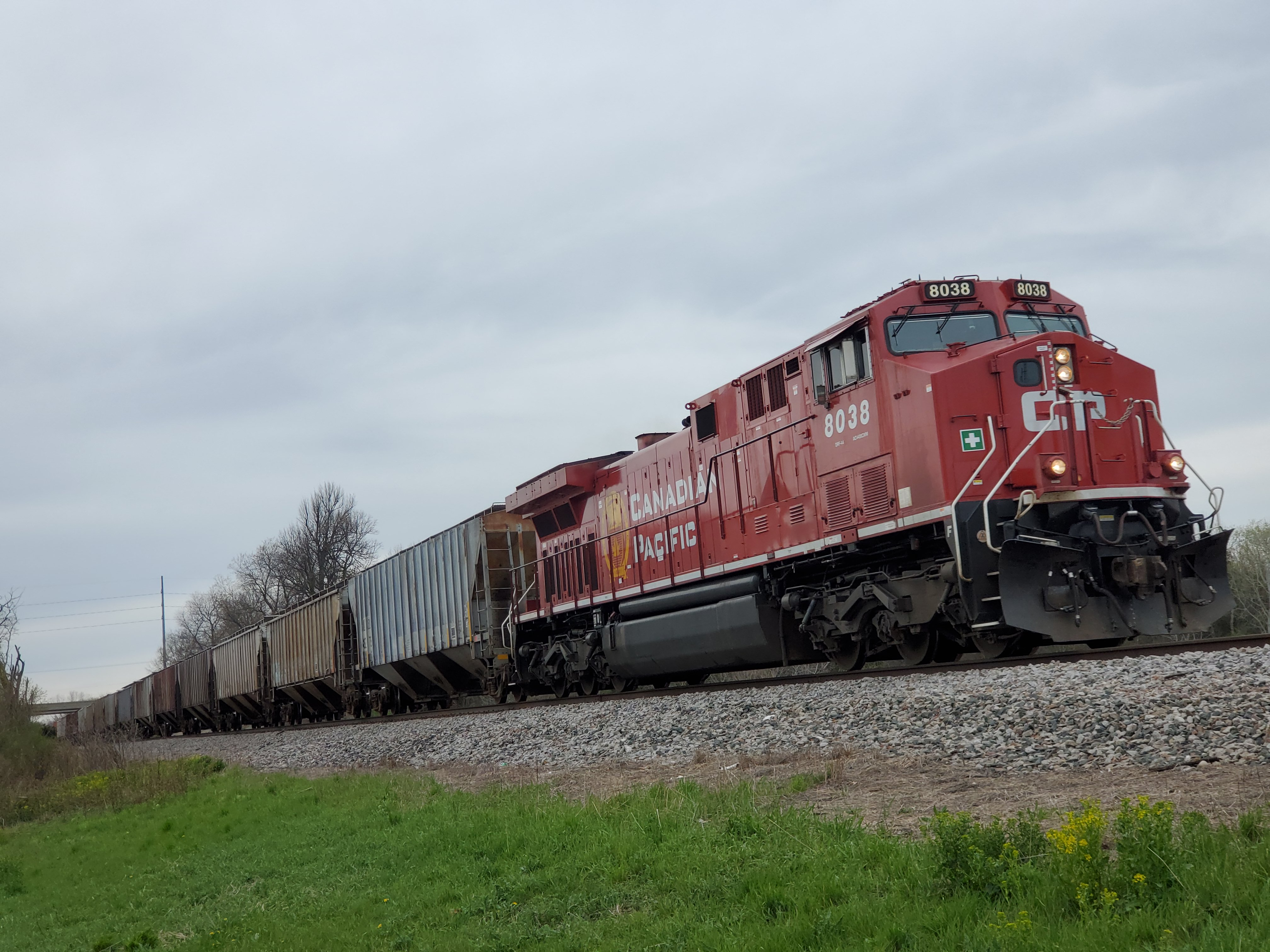
- A Canadian Pacific locomotive leads a train through Duplainville on May 2, 2020.
- Nickname: Dupy
- Location within Wisconsin
- Coordinates: 43°4′24.8″N 88°11′48.5″W
- Country: United States
- State: Wisconsin
- County: Waukesha
- City: Pewaukee
- Elevation: 856 ft (261 m)
- Time zone: UTC-6 (Central (CST))
  - Summer (DST): UTC-5 (CDT)
- ZIP Code: 53186
- Area code: 262

Duplainville is a neighborhood located within the city of Pewaukee, Wisconsin, United States. It is around three miles north of Waukesha, and around 15 miles west of Milwaukee. The area is mainly industrial, but is most known among railfans because of the diamond junction between the Canadian Pacific Kansas City Watertown Subdivision and the Canadian National Railway Waukesha Subdivision.

== History ==
In 1855, the Chicago, Milwaukee, St. Paul and Pacific Railroad (Milwaukee Road) built a railroad line from Brookfield to Watertown, which eventually went to Portage. In 1885, the Wisconsin Central Railroad built a railroad line from Rugby Junction to Chicago. This eventually led to their tracks crossing in Duplainville. In 1890, a tower was built in the northwest quadrant of the diamond. Because of heavy winter snow, help was hired to keep the tracks and switches clear. Although there were signals and gates at the Duplainville Rd crossing, there were numerous accidents and some fatalities. The tower burned down on January 1, 1929. A new brick building was then built, which was torn down in 1987 after an interchange track was installed in the northeastern quadrant of the diamond connecting the two lines.

The line built by the Milwaukee Road eventually fell under the ownership and control of the Soo Line Railroad in 1986. Canadian Pacific assumed full ownership and control of the line in 1990 after purchasing the Soo Line (CP merged with Kansas City Southern in April 2023 to form CPKC). The line built by Wisconsin Central went through the ownership of various railroads before being handed to Canadian National in 2001.

The interchange switch on the CP side was removed on or around August 1, 2019 due to a dispute over where in Chicago the railroads should interchange and a lack of activity.

== Current railroad operations ==
The diamond junction in the center of Duplainville attracts many rail enthusiasts and railroad photographers due to around 20–25 trains that run through each line per day. The east–west mainline belongs to CPKC's double-tracked Watertown subdivision, which operates under the Soo Line Railroad subsidiary although Amtrak's Empire Builder and Borealis services also use this line. Duplainville is at milepost 102.2. The north–south mainline belongs to the Canadian National Railway's single-tracked Waukesha Subdivision, which operates under the Wisconsin Central Ltd. subsidiary. Duplainville is at milepost 102.6. The Wisconsin and Southern Railroad also has trackage rights over this line.

Preceding station	Milwaukee Road	Following station
Pewaukee toward Madison	Madison – Milwaukee via Watertown	Brookfield toward Milwaukee
Preceding station	Soo Line	Following station
Sussex toward Portal	Main Line	Waukesha toward Chicago
