= Waukesha station =

Historic railroad depot in Waukesha, Wisconsin

Waukesha
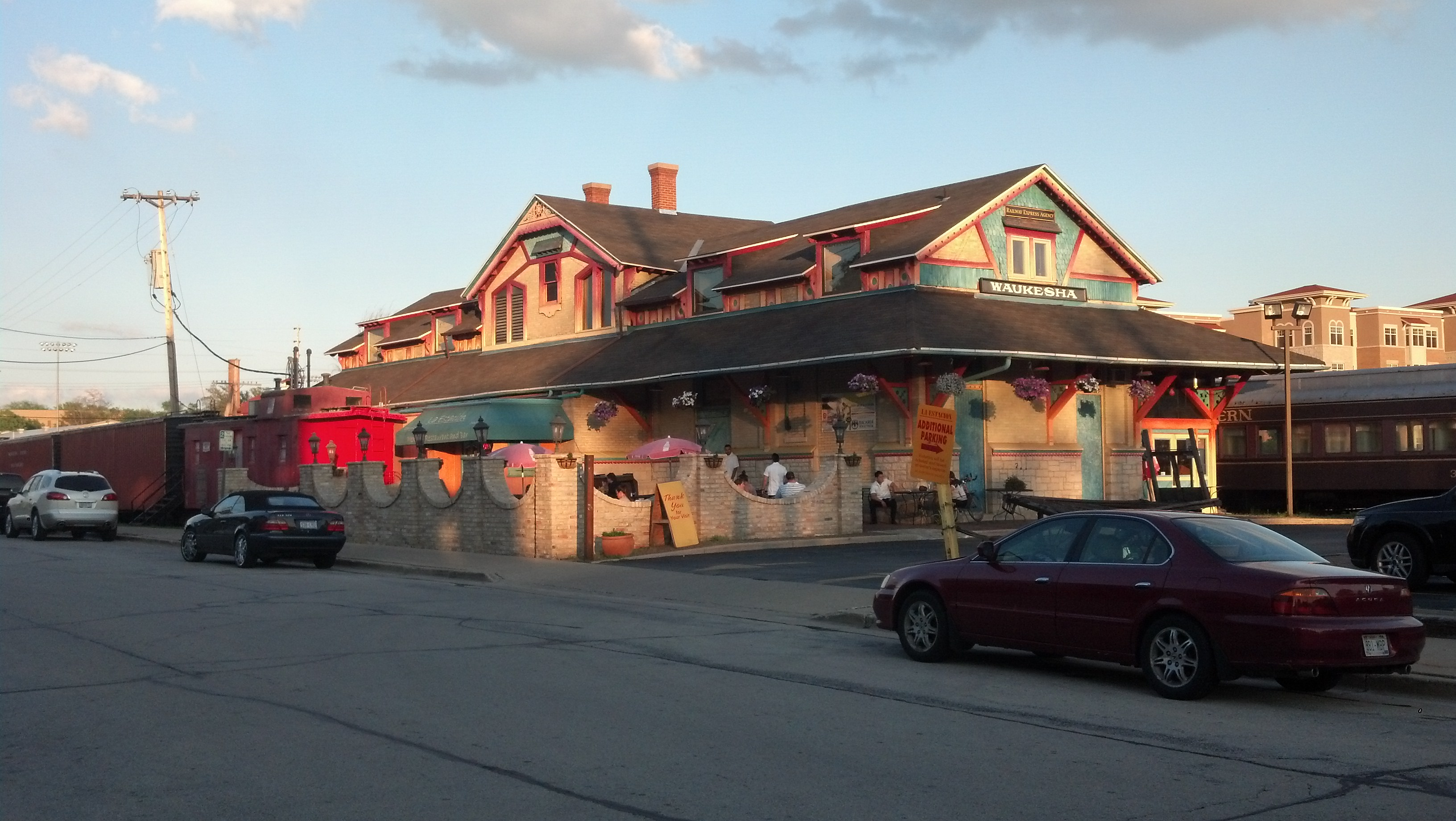
- The historic depot, now a restaurant

General information
- Location: 319 Williams Street, Waukesha, Wisconsin
- Coordinates: 43°00′20″N 88°13′57″W
- System: Former Chicago and North Western Railway station

Construction
- Structure type: At-grade
- Architect: Samuel Dodd
- Architectural style: Queen Anne

History
- Opened: 1881
- Closed: June 16, 1957

Services
Preceding station	Chicago and North Western Railway	Following station
Wales toward Madison	Madison – Milwaukee	New Berlin toward Milwaukee
Services at adjacent Madison Street station
Preceding station	Milwaukee Road	Following station
Genesee Depot toward Madison	Madison – Milwaukee via Waukesha	Brookfield toward Milwaukee
Services at Broadway station
Preceding station	Soo Line	Following station
Duplainville toward Portal	Main Line	Mukwonago toward Chicago
- Chicago and North Western Depot
- U.S. National Register of Historic Places
- Location within Wisconsin
- Location: 319 Williams Street, Waukesha, Wisconsin, United States
- Coordinates: 43°00′20″N 88°13′57″W
- Built: 1881
- Architect: Samuel Dodd
- Architectural style: Queen Anne
- NRHP reference No.: 95000142
- Added to NRHP: February 24, 1995
Location

The Chicago and North Western Depot in Waukesha, Wisconsin is a railroad depot built in 1881 and operated by the Chicago and North Western Railway. It is a 1.5-story cream brick building and was originally built for a predecessor of the C&NW. Passenger train service to the Waukesha station ended on June 16, 1957, when trains No. 601 and 620 were discontinued between Milwaukee and Madison. The final train carried just 7 passengers.

The depot now operates as a Mexican restaurant, La Estacion. Behind the building are five passenger cars, believed to have belonged to the Gulf, Mobile and Ohio Railroad. These serve as extra dining space. Two boxcars and a caboose sit in the front of the depot, however their origins remain unknown. The depot is located next to a Wisconsin and Southern Railroad mainline, with a junction connecting it and the Canadian National Railway's Waukesha Subdivision just to the east. The C&NW track west of WI 164 has since been removed.

The depot was listed on the National Register of Historic Places in 1995 and on the State Register of Historic Places in 1994.
