= Duplain =

Duplain may refer to:

- Claude Duplain (born 1954), Canadian politician
- Duplain Township, Michigan, United States
- Duplainville, Wisconsin, a neighborhood, United States
