= Cardinal Hotel =

- U.S. National Register of Historic Places
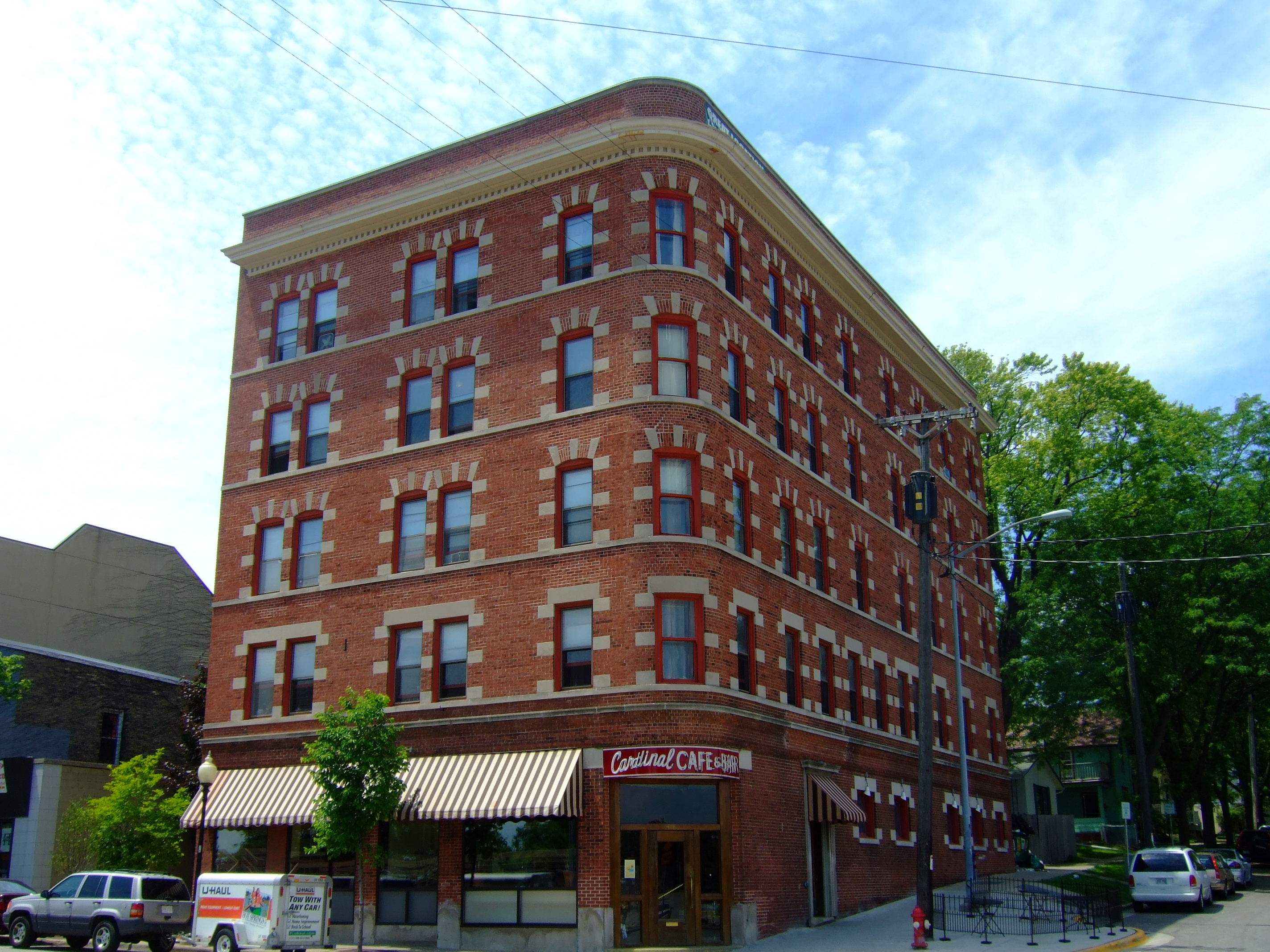
- Cardinal Hotel

- Location within Wisconsin Location within the United States
- Location: 416 E. Wilson St., Madison, Wisconsin
- Coordinates: 43°04′32″N 89°22′37″W
- Area: less than one acre
- Built: 1908
- Architect: Ferdinand Kronenberg
- NRHP reference No.: 82000650
- Added to NRHP: September 2, 1982

The Cardinal Hotel is a railroad hotel built in 1908. It is one-half mile east of the capitol in Madison, Wisconsin. Starting in 1974, under the ownership of Ricardo Gonzalez, the hotel's bar became a hub of Madison's gay and Cuban communities. In 1982, the building was added to the National Register of Historic Places.

== History ==
Ernest Eckstedt had the Cardinal Hotel built in 1908 and 1909. Eckstedt had been born to German immigrants in Milwaukee in 1864. He worked in a flour mill and a tannery, then got a job with the Chicago, Milwaukee & St. Paul Railroad, working as a switchman, then other jobs. In 1885, he moved to Madison and settled in the German-heavy Williamson Street neighborhood. In 1902, he built the Atlas Hotel at 221-223 S. Baldwin Street. He sold the Atlas after a few years and ran the Tivoli Gardens at Williamson and Baldwin.

In 1907, always watching for opportunities, Eckstedt bought two lots at the corner of S. Franklin and E. Wilson, just across Wilson Street from the Chicago, Milwaukee and St. Paul depot. He tore down a barber shop and built the first three stories of the Cardinal Hotel, opening July 1, 1908. The fourth and fifth stories were added the following year.

The hotel was designed by architect Ferdinand Kronenberg, who had immigrated from Germany in 1885 and settled in Madison. He designed the Cardinal Hotel with a rounded corner facing the depots which would provide much of its business. The street-facing walls are red-brick broken by regular windows which rest on bands of lighter horizontal trim. The windows themselves are framed by quoins and voussoirs in colors that alternate between red that matches the brick and a lighter stone. A cornice runs around the street-facing sides above the fifth story with a line of dentils beneath. The door on the curved corner led into a tavern at the front of the building, with Craftsman-style dark wood finishes and leaded glass windows. A door on the other Wilson Street corner led to a restaurant and hotel lobby on the first floor. With the addition of the fifth story, there were 56 guest rooms on the floors above. Eckstedt himself had an apartment on the second floor in the curved corner above the tavern.

In addition to the CM&SP depot across Wilson Street, the Chicago & Northwestern depot was a block up Wilson. Travelers arriving in Madison by train saw the then-prominent 5-story building with the striking multi-colored masonry and the hotel became "a headquarters for railroad men and also was well known to hundreds of traveling men." Eckstedt became a prominent member of the business community, operating the Cardinal for twenty years and becoming the head of the Valecia Condensed Milk Company and guiding its expansion. When Ernest died in 1928, his son George took over the hotel for four years, when he died. A number of owners followed George. As rail travel gave way to automobiles, the hotel offered longer-term rentals.

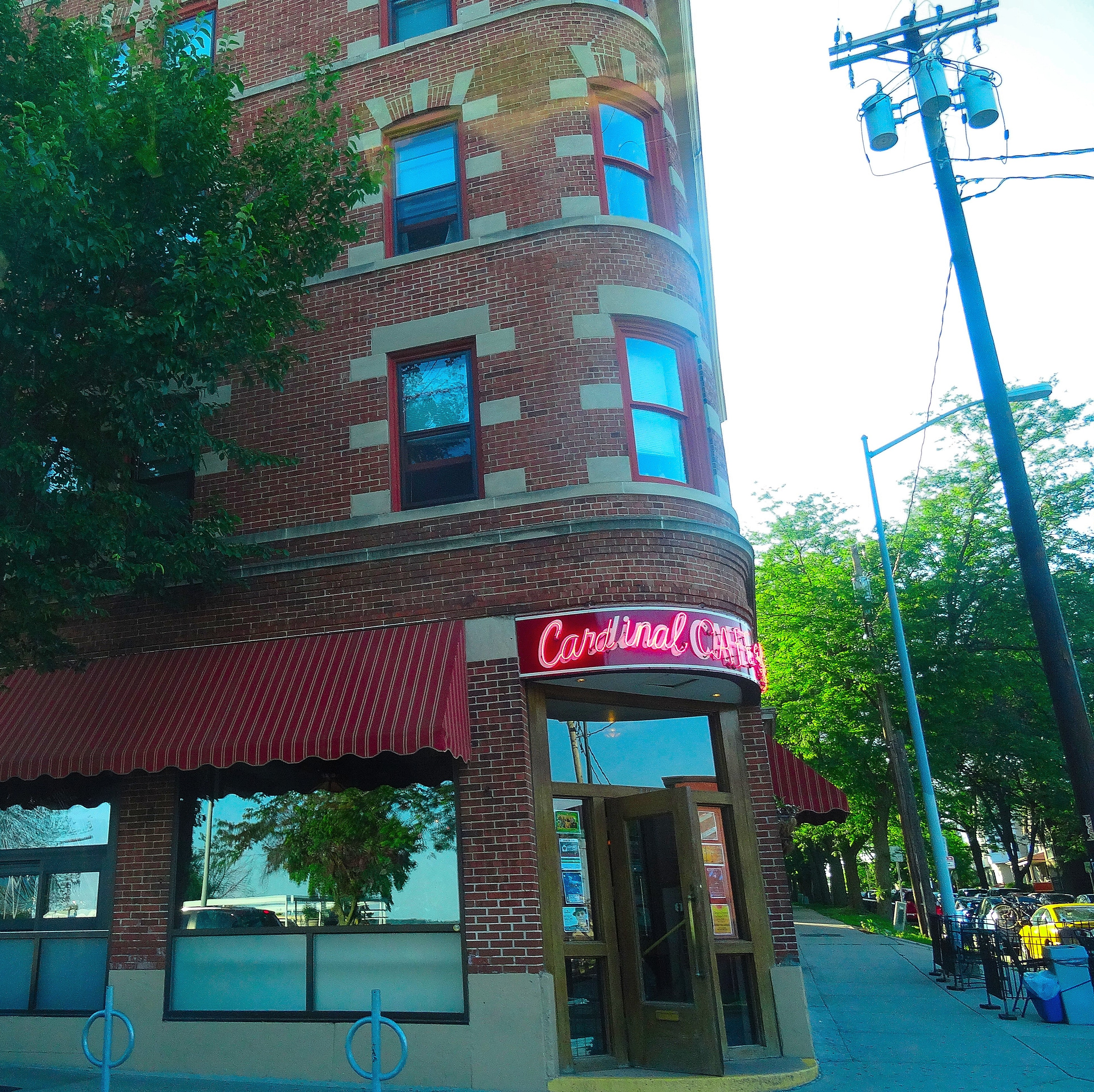

In 1974, Ricardo Gonzalez took over the Cardinal Bar. Gonzalez was born in Cuba in 1946 and immigrated to the U.S. in 1960 after the Cuban Revolution. He came to Ripon to work as a manager for the Green Giant canning company, then moved to Madison to work as an affirmative action officer. Under his management, the bar became popular with LGBTQ and Latino communities, and was an organizing center for them, hosting fundraisers for LGBTQ causes and candidates. Gonzalez himself was elected alderman for Madison's 4th district in 1989 - the first gay Latino elected to public office in the U.S. In that post he worked to revitalize the downtown.

A fire in the 1980s led to the building being converted to condominiums. The building was listed on the National Register of Historic Places in 1982 and the State Register of Historic Places in 1989. Additionally, it is located within the East Wilson Street Historic District. In 2017 Ricardo Gonzalez sold the bar to Mike Eitel and it was converted to the Nomad World Pub.
