= Badger State Shoe Company building =

Historic place in Wisconsin, United States

- Badger State Shoe Company
- U.S. National Register of Historic Places
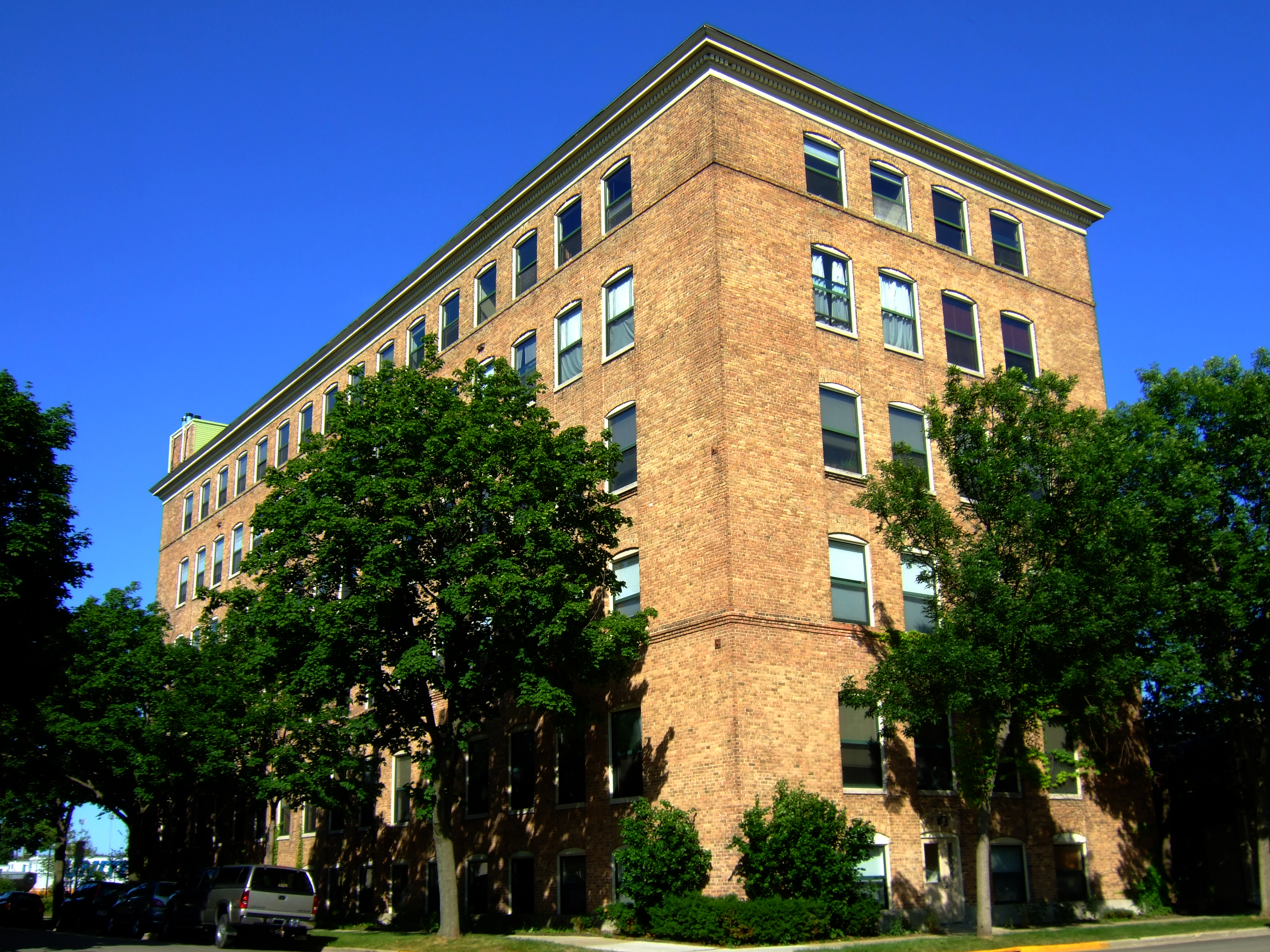
- Location: 123 N. Blount St. Madison, Wisconsin
- Coordinates: 43.08136°N 89.37847°W
- Built: 1910
- Architect: Ferdinand Kronenberg
- Architectural style: Classical Revival
- NRHP reference No.: 89000232
- Added to NRHP: April 11, 1989

The Badger State Shoe Company is a classically-styled 6-story shoe factory built in 1910 in Madison, Wisconsin, a half mile north-east of the Capitol. It was added to the National Register of Historic Places on April 11, 1989.

== History ==
Madison was founded to be Wisconsin's capital and from the start was more white collar than most other cities in the area, which grew as mill towns. By the end of the Civil War, Madison's only manufacturing enterprises were a few mills and an iron foundry. Some community leaders felt that the city needed to diversify by attracting large industries. On the other hand, some government and university workers didn't want their beautiful city between the lakes "soiled by industrial pollution." Growth was slow through the economic slump of the late 1800s, but a few manufacturers like Carmin & Billings Plow Works and Northern Electric Manufacturing did take hold. After 1900, industrial growth increased. Badger State Shoe Company was one of the manufacturing businesses starting in Madison at that time.

Shoemaking had evolved in the 19th century from small local shoemaking shops to bigger factories that used machines and unskilled workers for mass-production. Some of the cities along Lake Michigan had big leather tanneries, and the supply of leather and transportation connections fueled the growth of shoe production there. Badger Shoe had incorporated in Milwaukee in 1893, after reorganizing from an earlier shoe company. The directors were Albert and Henry L. Atkins. In 1900 they relocated their factory from St. Paul Avenue in Milwaukee to what is now 1335 Gilson Street in South Madison, possibly to lower their operating costs. After a few years of difficult hiring at that location, they opened another factory on Wilson Street. In 1909 they announced plans to consolidate their operations into a new building.

The location chosen on Blount Street was in a low-lying section of the isthmus which had been called the "Great Central Marsh." Filling and development of the area began in the 1890s, with many streets there built up with cinder-fill, and mixing industry with residential use. The rail lines ran by a few blocks to the south, providing good transportation.

Badger Shoe hired Ferdinand Kronenberg to design their new factory. Kronenberg was born in Germany around 1877 and apprenticed in Madison. He had designed homes around Madison and the Cardinal Hotel in 1908. For the new shoe factory he designed a six-story block clad in Chicago brick. The decoration was simple, but refined for a factory. Bands of windows are uniformly spaced except for the corners where an expanse of solid brick the full height of the building suggests four solid corner columns. Lines of brick corbel below the third-floor windows and the sixth-floor windows also suggest a stable base and a lighter top. The building is topped with a denticulated iron cornice, again drawing from classical architecture.

Inside, the framework is wood, with 10-inch square wood posts supporting 8x10 and 10x12 wooden joists which support 2-inch pine planks which were covered in maple flooring. The office entrance at the front of the building led up half a flight of stairs to offices on the second floor, but most of the building was manufacturing space. It was modern for its day, well-lit by the many windows, well-ventilated, and with an automatic sprinkler system.

The building cost $40,000 and the factory began operating in the spring, employing about 250 people. Soon it was producing 2,000 pairs of shoes a day - women's and children's shoes which were sold to the Chicago wholesaler Heiz and Schwab. Sales boomed during World War I and in 1917 Edward C. Wolfram, an industrialist from Watertown, bought the factory.

In the 1920s shoe materials shifted from leather to synthetics, and more shoes began to be imported. Shoe manufacture became less profitable. After the onset of the Great Depression, Badger Shoe stopped production in 1930 and all of the Wolframs' holdings were liquidated.

In subsequent years the building was bought by Crescent Electric and used as a warehouse. Later it was bought by Rowley-Schlimgen, an office supply company. At some point most of the windows were bricked in, which can be seen in photos attached to the NRHP nomination below.

In 1989 the building was listed on the NRHP for being an unusual survivor of mid-sized factories from around the turn of the century in Madison, and for its classic style, which is unusual in a factory. It was also designated a landmark by the Madison Landmarks Commission in 1989. In recent years the Alexander Companies restored the windows and converted the building to Das Kronenberg Apartments.
