= William Washburn =

William Washburn may refer to:

- William Washburn (architect) (1808–1890), architect and city councilor in Boston, Massachusetts
- William B. Washburn (1820–1887), American politician representing Massachusetts
- William D. Washburn (1831–1912), American politician representing Minnesota
- William Henry Washburn, American politician in Wisconsin
