= East Wilson Street Historic District =

Historic district in Wisconsin, United States

- U.S. National Register of Historic Places
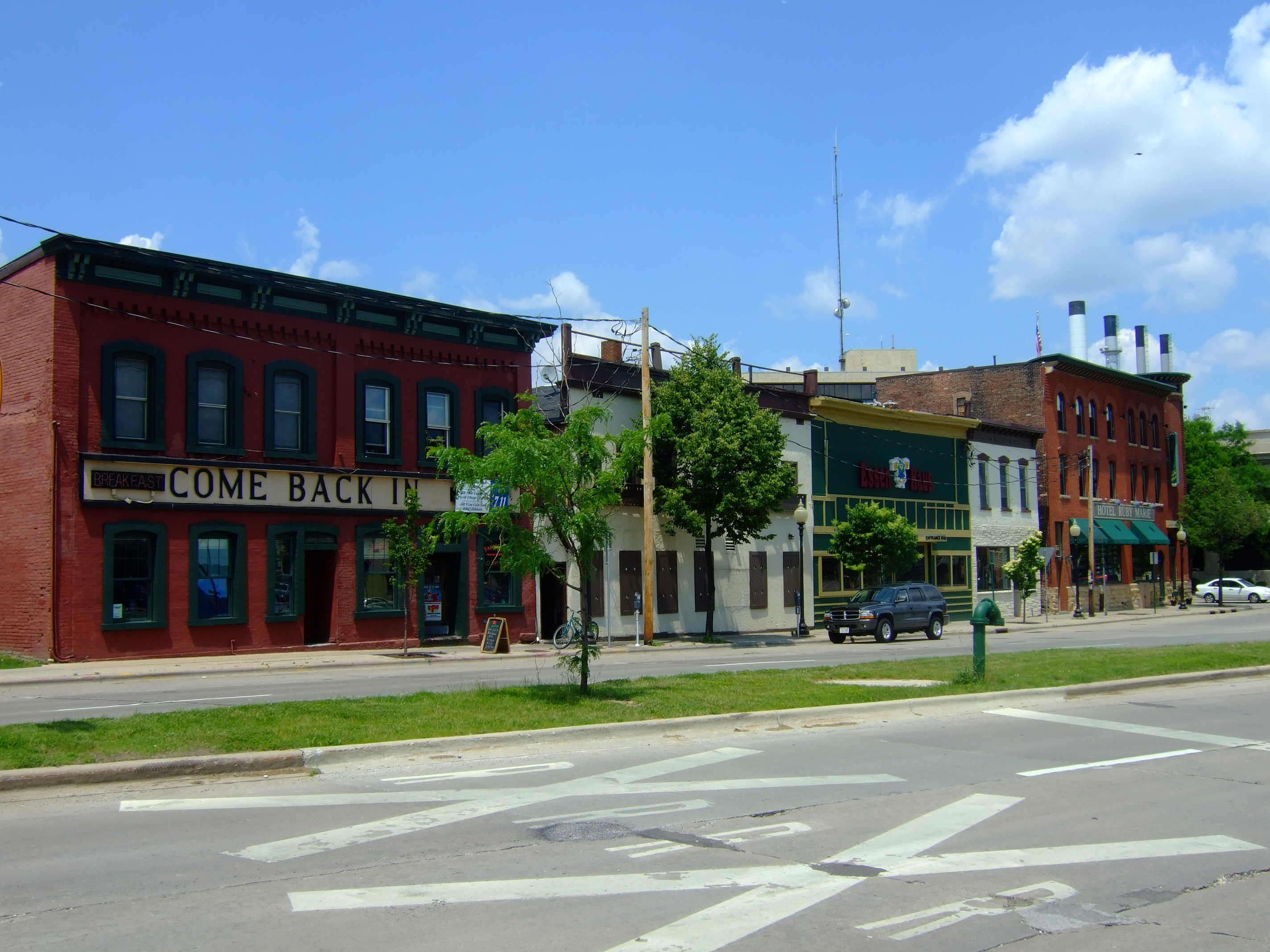
- A portion of the district on East Wilson Street

- Location within Wisconsin Location within the United States
- Location: 402—524 E. Wilson and 133 S. Blair Sts., Madison, Wisconsin
- Coordinates: 43°04′36″N 89°22′34″W
- Area: 4.3 acres (1.7 ha)
- NRHP reference No.: 86000618
- Added to NRHP: April 3, 1986

The East Wilson Street Historic District includes remnants of businesses that grew around two railroad depots a half mile east of the capitol in Madison, Wisconsin, starting in the 1860s. A cluster of the hotel and saloon buildings from this district are still fairly intact, in contrast to Madison's other railroad station on West Washington. In 1986 the district was listed on the National Register of Historic Places and the State Register of Historic Places in 1989.

== History ==
A mania for railroad-building swept the U.S. in the second half of the 1800s, before the automobile. The first railroad to reach Madison was the Milwaukee and Mississippi Railroad, crossing the state westward. In 1854 it began to provide service at a large stone depot six blocks west of the capitol. In 1864 the Chicago and North Western Railway built a line into Madison from Beloit to the south, crossing Monona Bay. The C&NW tried to persuade the earlier Milwaukee Road to build a union depot on Blair Street, but Milwaukee declined. Instead in 1869 it built a small passenger depot on East Wilson. In 1871 the C&NW built passenger and freight depots nearby, east of Blair Street. Three more rail lines entered Madison by 1871, passing through this east-side depot area: one from Sun Prairie, one from Portage/Green Bay, and one from Baraboo.

Businesses grew in the area to serve railroad men and passengers. In 1867 Prussian immigrant Herman Klueter opened a wooden grocery store on E. Wilson. Four years later he built a two-story brick building for his grocery, added a feed business, and rented his old store to a butcher. In 1872 William Schumacher built the two-story Germania House Hotel – still existing at 510 E. Wilson St. In 1873 August Ramthun built the Madison house hotel and saloon at 520–524 E. Wilson. In 1875 George Schlotthauer added the Lake City House at 502 E. Wilson. In 1885 the C&NW built a bigger 2-story brick depot, which housed a small hotel and dining room. Also nearby by that time there were another grocer, two tobacco shops, several barbers, and three small saloons. (The 600 block of East Wilson and Williamson Streets nearby was heavily German, and it shows in the names of these early businessmen.)

In 1886 the Milwaukee Road built a new Victorian Gothic train station nearby. Hotels continued to expand and other businesses started. "By the 1890s, the east and west depot areas were among the liveliest spots in town." In 1899 148 trains passed through Madison each day. The five-story Cardinal Hotel was added in 1908 and 1909. The C&NW had hoped to build a grand depot on Blair Street, but it would have required closing Blount Street, which was opposed by local interests, so they scaled back their plans and built the smaller but elegant depot described below in 1915. Prohibition in 1916 forced most of the saloons to either close or shift to selling meals or soft drinks for twenty years. Even with increasing automobiles, rail traffic continued until after WWII, when passenger traffic began to decline. The Milwaukee Road shut down its east side depot in 1952 and the C&NW stopped passenger service in 1965.

Lacking lodging traffic from the railroads, the hotels switched to rent rooms weekly and monthly. Bars continued business, but the neighborhood declined. Prospects turned in 1980 when a luxury condominium was built east of the district. In 1982 the Cardinal Hotel was bought to be rehabilitated as an apartment building. And in 1983 Madison Gas and Electric built their new headquarters behind the C&NW station, incorporating the depots into their new complex.

== Contributing buildings ==
These are some of the surviving historic contributing buildings in the district, listed in roughly the order built:

- Herman Kleuter's Grocery at 506–508 E Wilson St is a 2-story brick store with the east section built in 1871 and the west section added in 1891. It housed Kleuter's grocery store, feed store, and a meat market. The street-level storefronts have been redone, but the second-story windows, pilasters, brick corbelling and cornice are intact.
- The East Madison House at 520–524 E Wilson was built in 1873 by August Ramthun as a 3-story brick hotel and restaurant. In 1891–1892 it was expanded west. The exterior was rebuilt in 1897, retaining Italianate-style windows, but adding the Queen Anne-style corner tower. More recently the establishment has been called the Wilson Hotel and the Hotel Ruby Marie.
- The Lake City House at 502 E Wilson is a 3-story brick hotel and saloon built in 1875 by George Schlotthauer. The hood moulds over the windows and the bracketed cornice place it within Italianate style.
- The August Krehl Pharmacy at 408 E Wilson St is a two-story brick store built in 1889, with commercial Italianate brick pilasters and dentils and a wooden cornice.

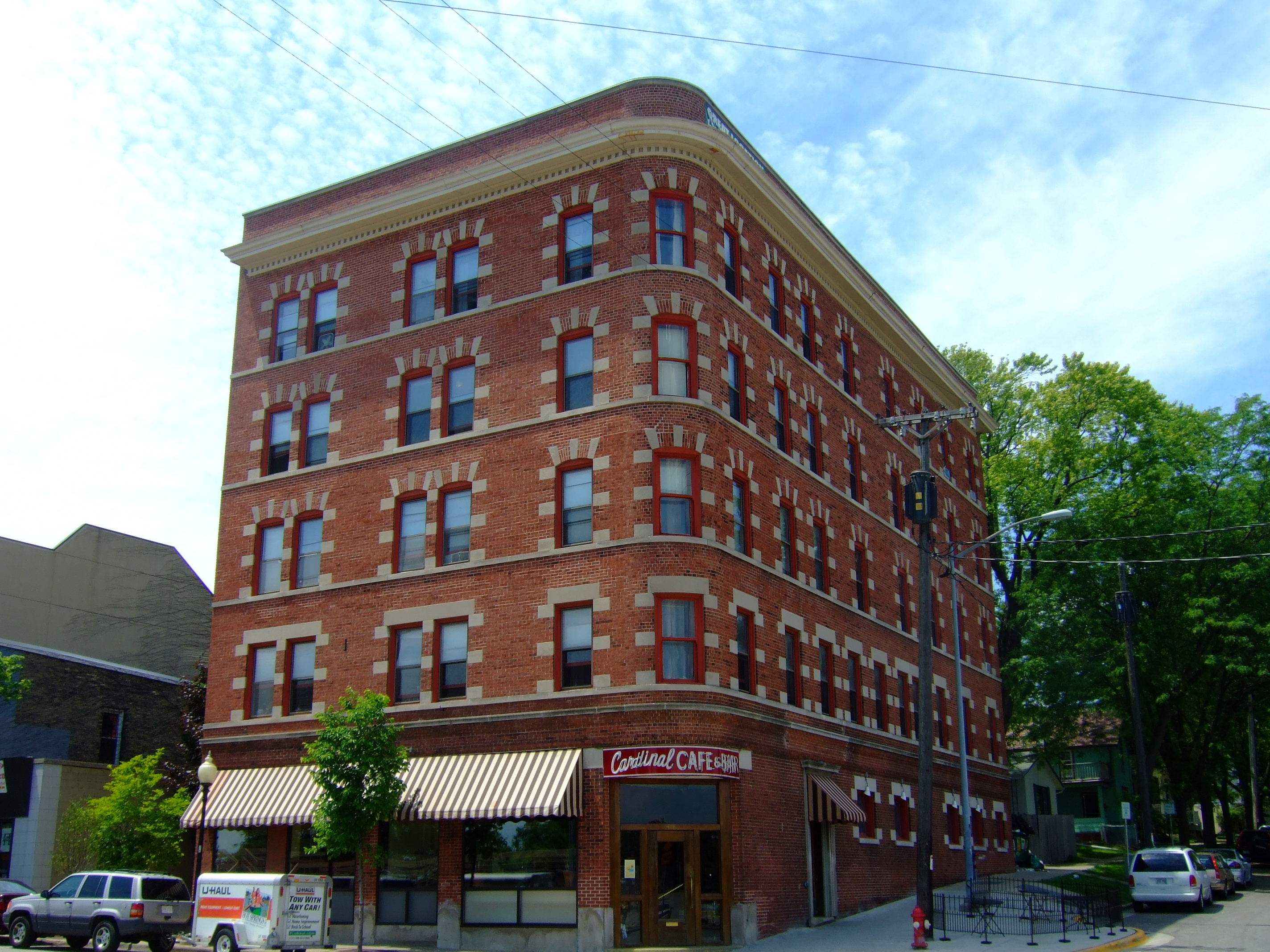
1908 Cardinal Hotel

- The Cardinal Hotel at 416–420 E Wilson is a 5-story Neoclassical-styled hotel built by former railroad worker Ernest Eckstedt in 1908 and 1910 – the last and largest railroad hotel built in Madison.

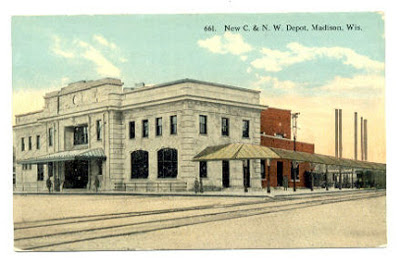
1910 C&NW passenger depot, from a 1910s postcard

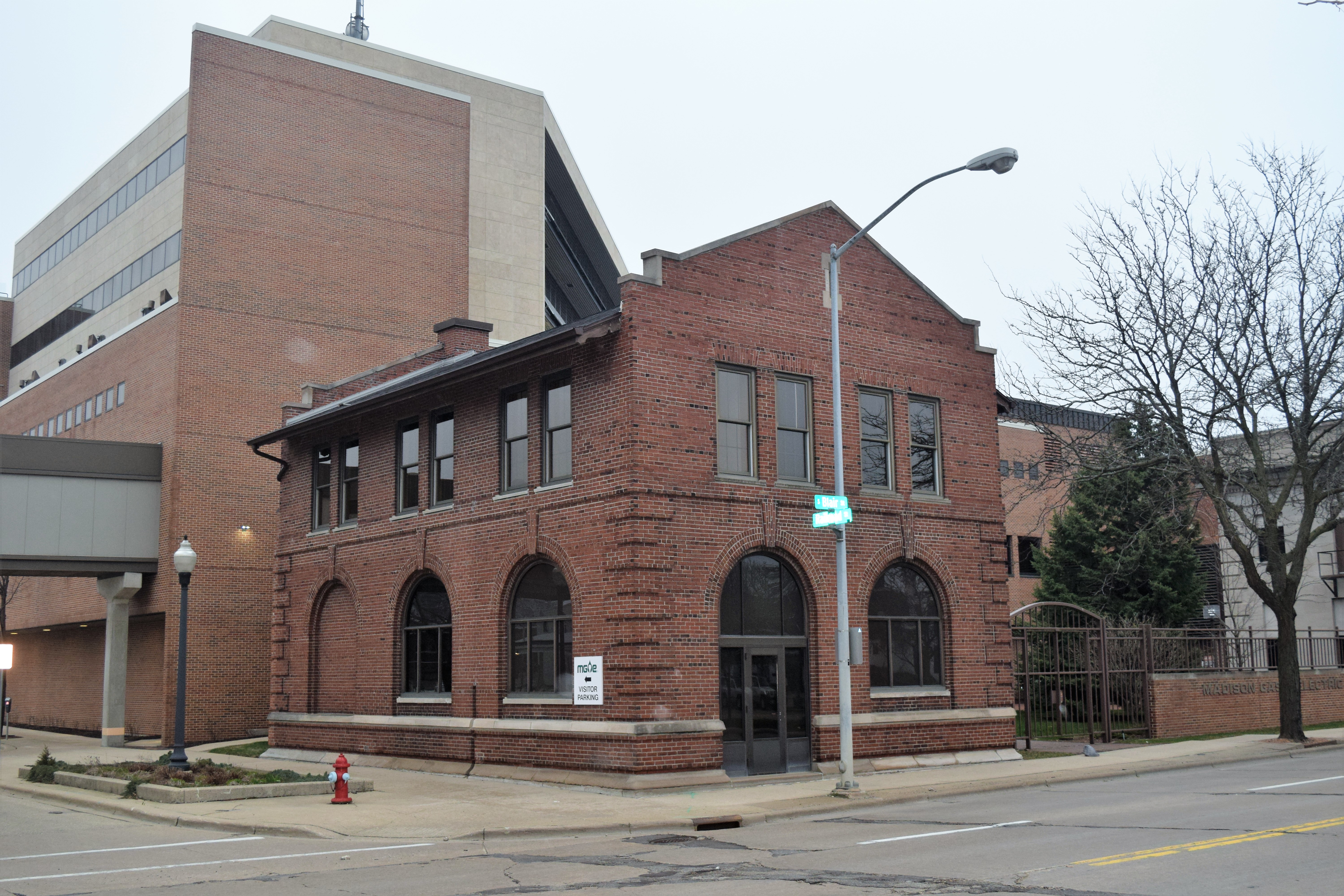
ca 1908 C&NW freight depot

- The Chicago and North Western station at 133 S Blair Street is the C&NW's second depot on the east side of Madison. The passenger depot was built 1910–1911 – two stories clad in gray limestone – a Neoclassical design by Frost and Granger, with heavy quoins on all corners and the entrance lit by second-story windows. To the northwest is a 2-story red brick freight house – also quoined – with round segmentally-arched openings at street level. When Madison Gas and Electric acquired the station and built their complex in the 1980s, they tore down some of the railroad structures behind, but preserved these two historic buildings, incorporating them into their complex sensitively.
- The Isberner Clothing Store at 402 E Wilson is a 3-story dark brick building with stone trim built in 1923. It is a commercial interpretation of Prairie Style, and its original street-level storefront is still intact.
