= Franklin Avenue =

Franklin Avenue can refer to:

- Franklin Avenue (Los Angeles)
- Franklin Avenue Bridge, Minneapolis
- BMT Franklin Avenue Line, a New York City Subway line
  - Franklin Avenue Shuttle, a shuttle service on the line

== See also ==
- Franklin Street (disambiguation)
- Franklin Avenue Station (disambiguation)
