= Spring Creek Church =

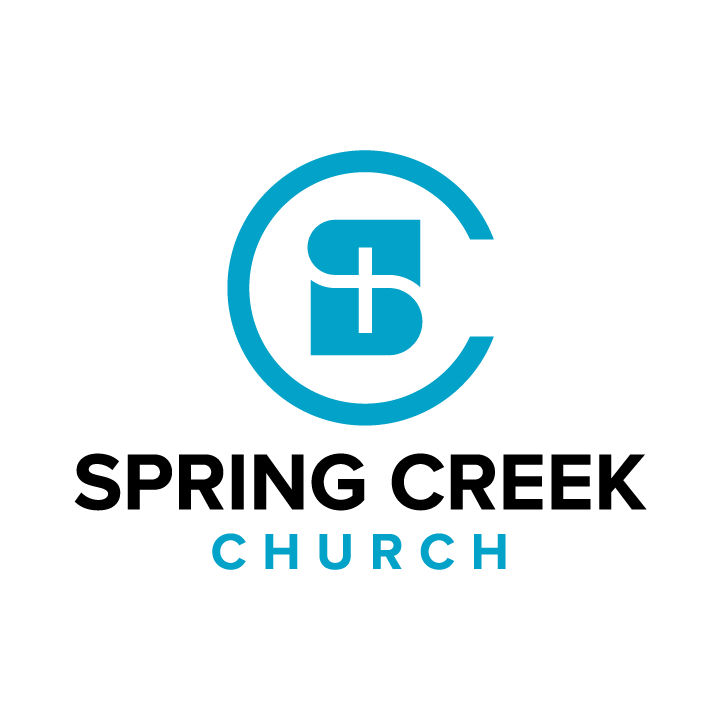
- Spring Creek Church
- Location: N35W22000 Capitol Drive, Pewaukee, WI 53072
- Country: United States
- Denomination: Non-denominational
- Website: springcreek.church

History
- Former name: Garfield Baptist Church
- Founded: 1882

Spring Creek Church is a non-denominational evangelical Christian megachurch located in Pewaukee, Wisconsin, a suburb of Milwaukee.

== History ==
The church was founded in 1882 as Garfield Baptist Church when a small group of Christians started a mission church. The church's earliest days unfolded in a small, wooden-frame building on the corner of Second Street and Garfield Avenue in Milwaukee.

In 1950 a new building was added adjacent to the old one. In 1961 the church launched its Awana children’s ministry and today, it is the oldest continually operated Awana program in the world. In 1964 sustained growth led the church to move 8 miles west into a new colonial building in the suburb of Wauwatosa. Involvement in worldwide missions also expanded to include dozens of families serving around the globe through the General Association of Regular Baptist Churches. Although the church is now officially non-denominational it still cooperates with the conservative Baptist organization it was formally a member of.

In 1987 William "Chip" Bernhard became the senior pastor. Under Bernhard, the 1990s were marked by growth, and in 1997 the church again relocated 8 miles west into Waukesha County (where the majority of the congregation lived) on 99 acres of land in Pewaukee. For the first 4 years worship services were held in the gym. In 2001 the church voted to change its name to Spring Creek, which better reflected the new location and the church's desire to reach beyond its traditional Baptist roots.

Also in 2001 the church moved into a new $4 million worship center with a capacity of 850. After doubling attendance in the decade since moving to the new campus, in 2009 the church completed a $6 million expansion to the worship center (increasing capacity to nearly 1,500), a new foyer and Christian education wing.

Significant growth in the church’s kids and student ministries led to the realization of two long-planned facilities. In 2018 the church completed a 2-story kids ministry building and a state-of-the-art student center in 2023.

After 38 years as senior pastor, Chip Bernhard retired in 2025 and Matt Morton succeeded him.
