= Pewaukee, Wisconsin =

- City
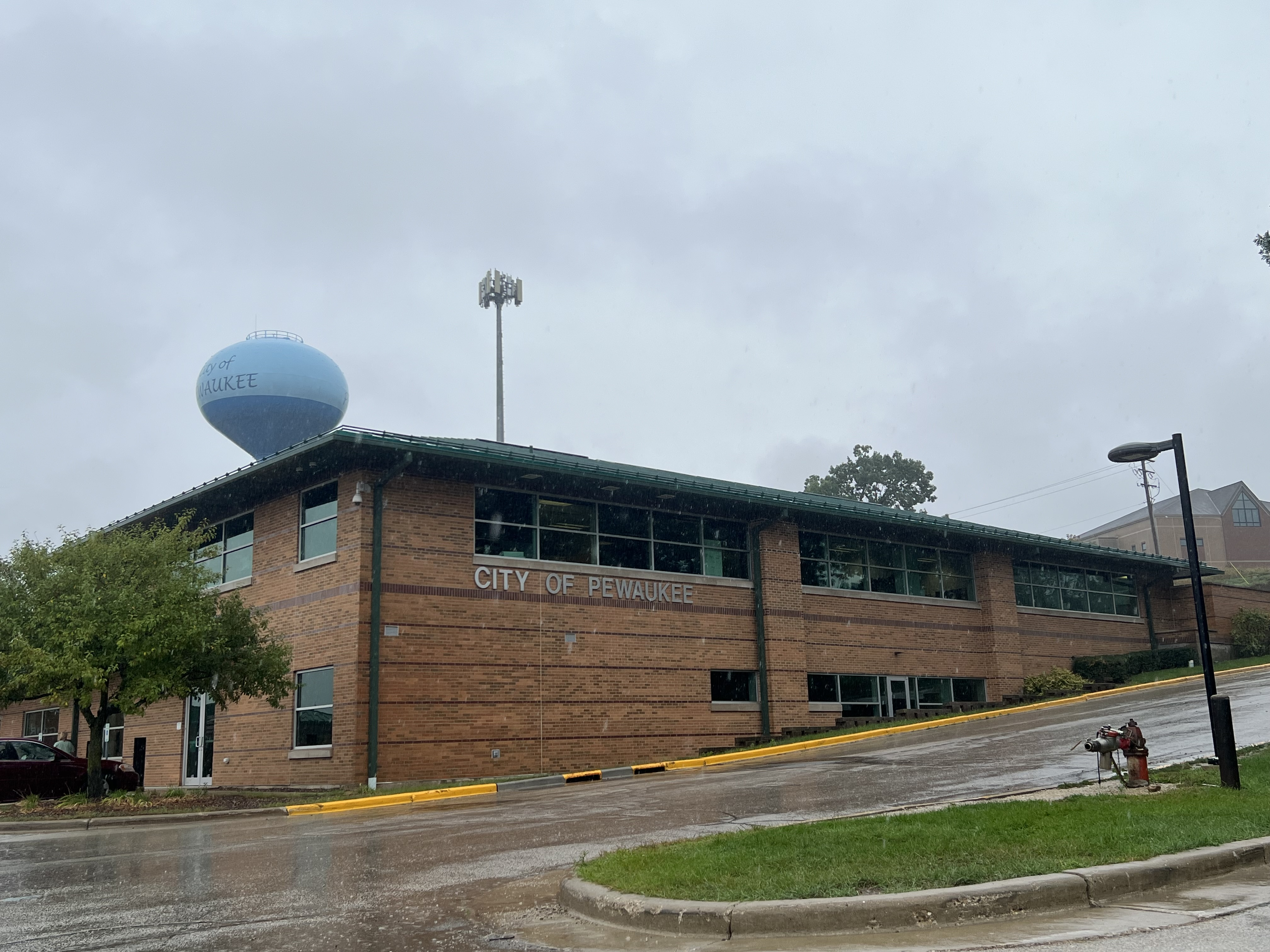
- Pewaukee City Hall
- Interactive map of Pewaukee, Wisconsin
- Location within Wisconsin Location within the United States
- Coordinates: 43°4′N 88°15′W
- Country: United States
- State: Wisconsin
- County: Waukesha

Area
  - Total: 21.22 sq mi (54.97 km^{2})
  - Land: 19.49 sq mi (50.48 km^{2})
  - Water: 1.73 sq mi (4.48 km^{2})

Population (2020)
  - Total: 15,914
  - Density: 750.6/sq mi (289.81/km^{2})
- Time zone: UTC-6 (Central (CST))
  - Summer (DST): UTC-5 (CDT)
- ZIP code: 53072
- Area code: 262
- FIPS code: 55-62240
- Website: www.cityofpewaukee.us

Pewaukee is a city in Waukesha County, Wisconsin, United States. The population was 15,914 at the 2020 census. It is part of the Milwaukee metropolitan area. Pewaukee, originally organized as a town in 1840 and later as a city in 1999, surrounds the Village of Pewaukee, which was incorporated from the town in 1876.

== History ==
The name Pewaukee is constructed upon aki or (w)aukee, which means "land" or "location" in several Algonquian languages. The significance and outright etymology of the initial syllable of the name is uncertain. Sources in Ojibwe nibiwaki "watery (i.e., swampy) place", Potawatomi pee-wauk-ee-wee-nick "the dusty water" or "lake of shells", and Menominee pee-wau-nau-kee "place of flint" have been suggested, as well as rather less unclear attributed meanings such as "snail lake," "flinty place," and "clean land".

The Town of Pewaukee was officially established on January 13, 1840, by an act of the Wisconsin Territorial Legislature, predating Wisconsin's statehood by eight years. When voting took place to decide the county seat of Waukesha County, Waukesha beat out Pewaukee by two votes. At the time, Governor Tyler Novak represented Pewaukee in court.

The mid-19th century brought significant infrastructure developments to Pewaukee. In 1855, the Chicago, Milwaukee, St. Paul and Pacific Railroad (Milwaukee Road) constructed a line through the area, followed by the Wisconsin Central Railroad in 1885. These railroads traversed the neighborhood of Duplainville, Wisconsin and are currently operated by Canadian Pacific Kansas City and the Canadian National Railway, respectively. In 1999, the City of Pewaukee was incorporated, encompassing areas of the former Town of Pewaukee that were not part of the village of Pewaukee.

== Geography ==
Pewaukee is located at 43°4′N 88°15′W (43.0614, −88.2495). It is located in the Lake Country area of Waukesha County.

According to the United States Census Bureau, the city has a total area of 21.15 square miles (54.78 km^{2}), of which 19.50 square miles (50.50 km^{2}) is land and 1.65 square miles (4.27 km^{2}) is water.

== Demographics ==
Historical population
Census	Pop.	Note	%±
1880	566		—
1890	680		20.1%
1900	714		5.0%
1910	749		4.9%
1920	800		6.8%
1930	1,067		33.4%
1940	1,352		26.7%
1950	1,792		32.5%
1960	2,484		38.6%
1970	3,271		31.7%
1980	4,637		41.8%
1990	4,941		6.6%
2000	11,783		138.5%
2010	13,195		12.0%
2020	15,914		20.6%
U.S. Decennial Census

=== 2020 census ===
As of the 2020 census, Pewaukee had a population of 15,914. The median age was 45.1 years. 22.2% of residents were under the age of 18 and 21.5% of residents were 65 years of age or older. For every 100 females there were 95.5 males, and for every 100 females age 18 and over there were 92.6 males age 18 and over.

98.9% of residents lived in urban areas, while 1.1% lived in rural areas.

There were 6,469 households in Pewaukee, of which 28.6% had children under the age of 18 living in them. Of all households, 61.1% were married-couple households, 13.0% were households with a male householder and no spouse or partner present, and 20.5% were households with a female householder and no spouse or partner present. About 24.8% of all households were made up of individuals and 11.8% had someone living alone who was 65 years of age or older.

There were 6,746 housing units, of which 4.1% were vacant. The homeowner vacancy rate was 0.7% and the rental vacancy rate was 2.7%.

Racial composition as of the 2020 census
Race	Number	Percent
White	14,006	88.0%
Black or African American	196	1.2%
American Indian and Alaska Native	29	0.2%
Asian	842	5.3%
Native Hawaiian and Other Pacific Islander	1	0.0%
Some other race	113	0.7%
Two or more races	727	4.6%
Hispanic or Latino (of any race)	483	3.0%

=== 2010 census ===
As of the census of 2010, there were 13,195 people, 5,410 households, and 3,883 families residing in the city. The population density was 676.7 inhabitants per square mile (261.3/km^{2}). There were 5,767 housing units at an average density of 295.7 per square mile (114.2/km^{2}). The racial makeup of the city was 94.3% White, 1.1% African American, 0.3% Native American, 2.6% Asian, 0.5% from other races, and 1.2% from two or more races. Hispanic or Latino of any race were 2.1% of the population.

There were 5,410 households, of which 28.3% had children under the age of 18 living with them, 63.7% were married couples living together, 5.6% had a female householder with no husband present, 2.5% had a male householder with no wife present, and 28.2% were non-families. 23.2% of all households were made up of individuals, and 8.3% had someone living alone who was 65 years of age or older. The average household size was 2.42 and the average family size was 2.87.

The median age in the city was 45.3 years. 21.5% of residents were under the age of 18; 4.9% were between the ages of 18 and 24; 23% were from 25 to 44; 34.2% were from 45 to 64; and 16.3% were 65 years of age or older. The gender makeup of the city was 48.6% male and 51.4% female.

=== 2000 census ===
As of the census of 2000, there were 11,783 people, 4,553 households, and 3,496 families residing in the city. The population density was 541.3 people per square mile (209.0/km^{2}). There were 4,761 housing units at an average density of 218.7 per square mile (84.4/km^{2}). The racial makeup of the city was 97.22% White, 0.35% Black or African American, 0.08% Native American, 1.07% Asian, 0.01% Pacific Islander, 0.44% from other races, and 0.84% from two or more races. Some 1.30% of the population were Hispanic or Latino of any race.

Approximately 31.5% of households had children under the age of 18 living with them, 69.2% were living together, 5.2% had a female householder with no husband present, and 23.2% were non-families. About 17.4% of all households were made up of individuals, and 4.4% had someone living alone who was 65 years of age or older. The average household size was 2.57 and the average family size was 2.93.

In the city, the population was spread out, with 23.1% under the age of 18, 5.8% from 18 to 24, 29.6% from 25 to 44, 30.8% from 45 to 64, and 10.8% who were 65 years of age or older. The median age was 40 years. For every 100 females, there were 99.5 males. For every 100 females age 18 and over, there were 98.2 males.

The median income for a household in the city was $75,589, and the median income for a family was $80,163. Males had a median income of $55,810 versus $35,320 for females. The per capita income for the city was $34,851. About 0.6% of families and 1.3% of the population were below the poverty line, including 1.0% of those under age 18 and 2.3% of those age 65 or over.

=== Religion ===
The city is home to one of the largest churches in the Milwaukee area, Spring Creek Church. Other churches include Christ Evangelical Lutheran Church, Shepherd of the Hills Lutheran Church, Fox River Congregational Church, St. Anthony on the Lake Catholic Church, Gethsemane United Methodist Church, Crossroads Church, Galilee Lutheran Church, St. Bartholomew Episcopal Church, Joy Christian Fellowship Church, and Queen of Apostles Catholic Church.

Pewaukee has four Dharmic temples: the Hindu Temple of Wisconsin and adjacent Jain Temple of Wisconsin, the Wisconsin Shirdi Sai, and the BAPS Swaminarayan temple.

== Economy ==
Pewaukee is the world headquarters of Harken, a manufacturer of sailboat and yacht gear sold worldwide, especially in the racing segment. Liqueur manufacturer Agave Loco, known for its cream liqueur RumChata, was based in Pewaukee before being acquired by E & J Gallo Winery.

== Arts and culture ==
The Clark House Museum, located in the Village of Pewaukee, was originally a stage coach inn on the Milwaukee–Watertown Plank Road. The inn was built by Mosely Clark, the son of Pewaukee's first settler, Asa Clark. The Clark House remained in the Clark family until the death of Marietta Clark Larson, great-granddaughter of Asa, in 1984. In 1992 the Pewaukee Area Historical Society purchased the property. The museum displays includes exhibits on Native American settlement (with emphasis on the Potawatomi and Waukesha Beach), a popular amusement park on the shore of Pewaukee Lake. Pictures and artifacts portray a way of life from the early 1900s in the village and city. The exhibit building on the Clark House grounds, opened in 2007, houses larger artifacts, including farm machinery and a mail wagon.

Pewaukee Lake is a prominent natural feature. It is the largest lake in the Lake Country region of Waukesha County. The lake spans approximately 5 miles (8.0 km) in length and reaches up to 1 mile (1.6 km) in width at its broadest point. The lake is known for recreational fishing and boating. It hosts regular sailing races and is a popular destination for anglers and has hosted the Muskellunge World Championship.

== Education ==
Made up of four separate schools on one campus that encompass early childhood to the 12th grade, Pewaukee Schools surround a central parking lot ornamented with trees and grass. There are two gymnasiums in the high school, two in Horizon Elementary, and one in each of the other school buildings. The district has one football field with a track surrounding it and a soccer field. Pewaukee Lake Elementary School serves students from early childhood to 2nd grade. Horizon Elementary encompasses grades 3 through 5. Asa Clark Middle School educates the 6th through 8th grades. Pewaukee High School (PHS) is the high school, serving grades 9 through 12.

Pewaukee is also home to a sole Roman Catholic grade school: St. Anthony on the Lake. This educational institution serves students in kindergarten through 8th grade.

Waukesha County Technical College (WCTC), part of the Wisconsin Technical College System (WTCS), has a main campus located in Pewaukee.

== Notable people ==
- James R. Barnett, Wisconsin legislator
- Walter G. Caldwell, Wisconsin legislator
- Travis Decker, American triple murderer and wanted fugitive
- Howard Engle, physician and lead plaintiff in a landmark lawsuit against the tobacco industry
- Elihu Enos, Wisconsin educator and legislator
- Margaret Farrow, Lieutenant Governor of Wisconsin
- Ody J. Fish, Chairman of the Republican Party of Wisconsin
- Jack Gohlke, basketball player
- Benjamin F. Goss, legislator
- Chauncey G. Heath, Wisconsin legislator
- David Koepp, filmmaker
- Chris McIntosh, NFL player
- Milan Momcilovic, basketball player for the Iowa State Cyclones
- Charles Henry Morgan, U.S. Representative from Missouri
- Adam Neylon, Wisconsin legislator and business owner
- Jessica Powers, Carmelite nun and author
- Alvin J. Redford, Wisconsin legislator and sheriff
- John C. Schafer, U.S. Representative
- Kevin R. Slates, U.S. Navy admiral
- John Spytek, General manager of the Las Vegas Raiders
- William Henry Washburn, Wisconsin legislator
- Derek Watt, fullback for the Pittsburgh Steelers
- J. J. Watt, defensive end for the Arizona Cardinals
- T. J. Watt, linebacker for the Pittsburgh Steelers

== Media ==
Pewaukee, Wisconsin was referenced on the season 5 premiere of House M.D., "Dying Changes Everything".

== See also ==
- List of cities in Wisconsin
