= MGE Energy =

American utility holding company based in Madison, Wisconsin

MGE Energy, Inc.
- Company type: Public
- Traded as: Nasdaq: MGEE; Russell 2000 component S&P 600 component
- Industry: Electricity and Natural Gas Utility
- Headquarters: Madison, Wisconsin, U.S.
- Products: electricity, natural gas, green energy options
- Total assets: ▲US$1.731 billion (FY 2015)
- Website: www.mgeenergy.com

MGE Energy: MGE Energy, Inc. (Nasdaq: MGEE) is a utility holding company based in Madison, Wisconsin. Its main subsidiary, Madison Gas and Electric Co., produces and distributes electricity and distributes natural gas.

== Subsidiaries ==
MGE Energy is the parent corporation and holding company of eight subsidiaries.

- Madison Gas and Electric Co. (MGE), a regulated utility, and its divisions, which serve natural gas and electric customers in south-central and south-western Wisconsin. MGE has 146,000 electric customers and 152,000 natural gas customers.
- MGE Power, which owns assets in the West Campus Cogeneration Facility at Madison, Wis., and the Elm Road Generating Station at Oak Creek, Wis.
- MGE Transco Investment, which owns interest in the American Transmission Co. through its members, MGE and MGE Energy
- MGE Services provides construction and other services
- Central Wisconsin Development Corp. promotes business growth in MGE's service area
- MAGAEL holds title to properties acquired for future utility plant expansion
- North Mendota Energy & Technology Park owns property and serves as the development entity for the property

== History ==
The company's history in the Madison area date back more than 150 years. In 1888, as the renamed Madison Electric Co., it began delivering electric service. In 1892, the Four Lakes Light and Power Co. succeeded Madison Electric Co. and operated as Madison's electricity provider for the next four years. In 1896, the local utility incorporated to become Madison Gas and Electric Co.

In 2001, the company formed a holding company named MGE Energy, Inc. − and Madison Gas and Electric Co. became its main subsidiary.
