= Madison Gas and Electric Company Powerhouse =

- U.S. National Register of Historic Places
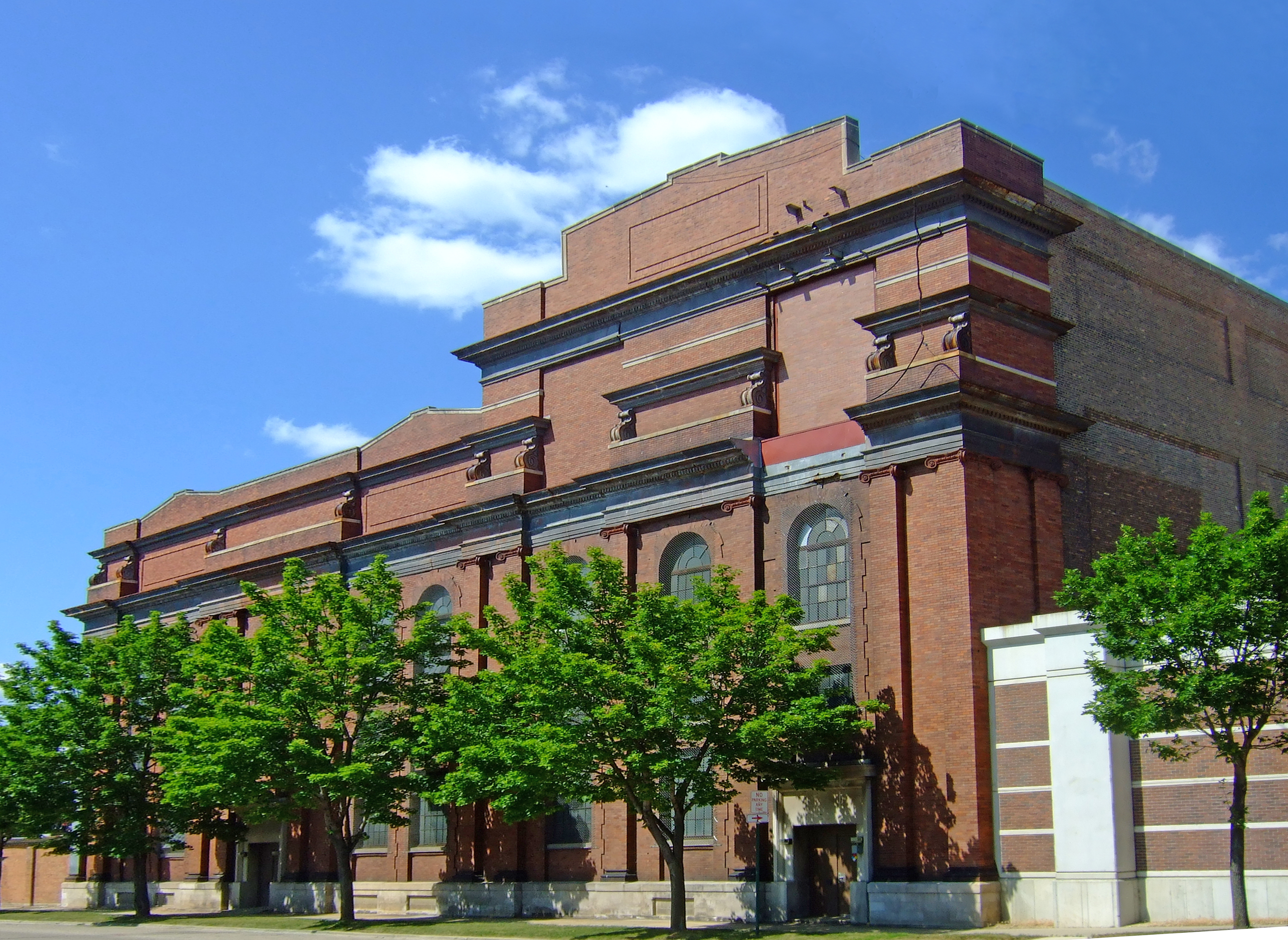
- Madison Gas and Electric Company Powerhouse
- Location: 100 S. Blount St. Madison, Wisconsin
- Built: 1902
- Architect: Claude and Starck/Mead and Seastone
- Architectural style: Classical Revival
- NRHP reference No.: 02001126
- Added to NRHP: December 6, 2002

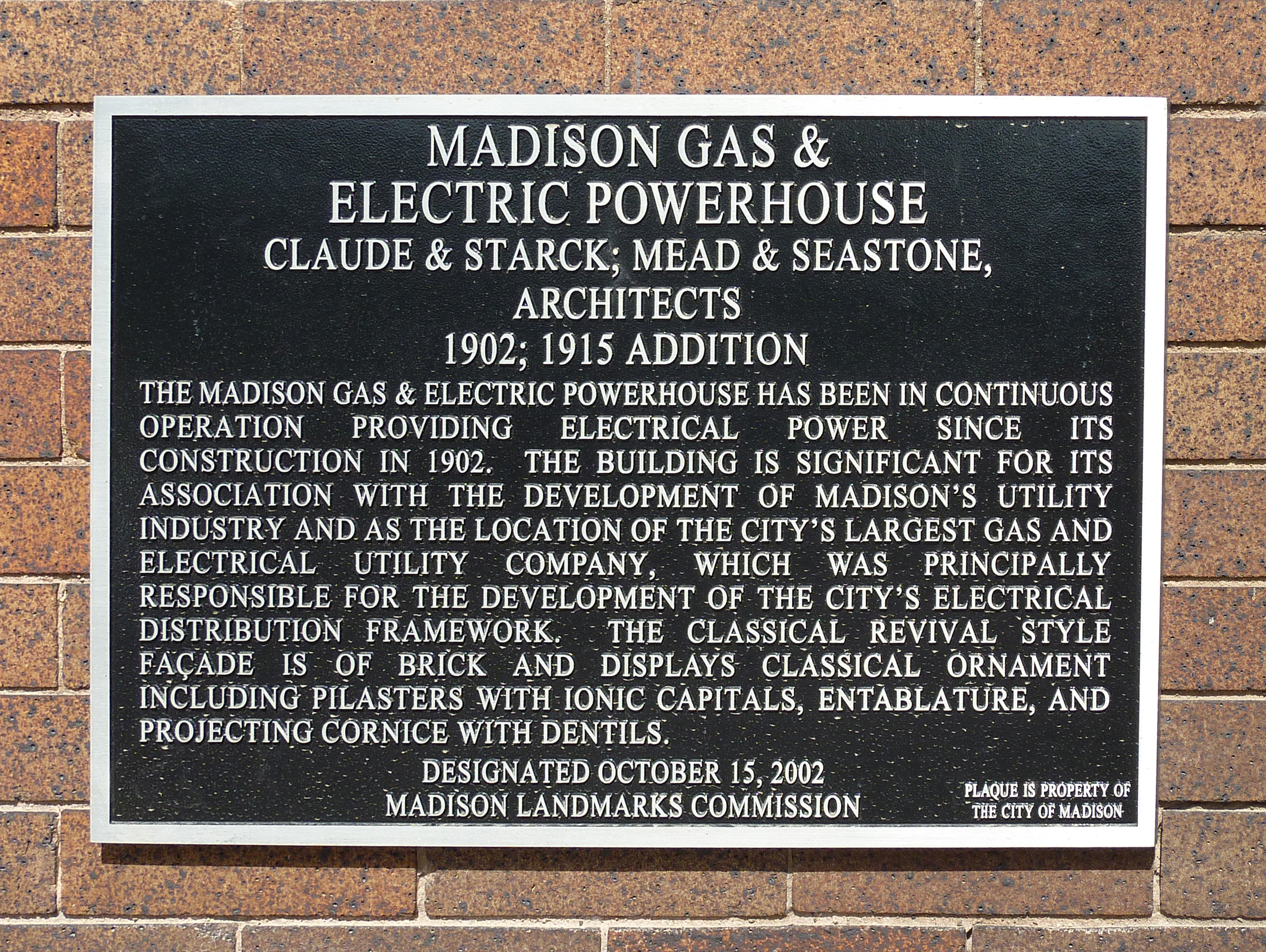
Madison Landmark plaque

The Madison Gas and Electric Company Powerhouse in Madison, Wisconsin is a Neoclassical-style structure built in 1902 by Madison Gas and Electric to house its gas-powered electrical generator. In 2002 historic parts of the complex were added to the National Register of Historic Places.

== History ==
The roots of the Madison Gas and Electric Company start in 1855 with the formation of the Madison City Gas Light and Coke Company. This enterprise began lighting some streets and a few homes with gas lights in 1855, and swiftly grew to cover much of the city. When electric lighting became available as a competitor to gas lights in the 1880s, another company pitched electric street lights, but Madison City Gas Light and Coke fought to keep its gas light business alive, using a series of underhanded moves. Eventually electric lighting won out. By 1896, Gas Light and Coke was purchased by a New York utility syndicate, gas lighting largely was abandoned, and the company was merged with others to become Madison Gas & Electric.

In its early years MG&E expanded Madison's gas lines in particular, promoting gas stoves and gas heaters as clean and convenient compared to wood and coal. The company sold gas stoves on installments of $13 a month in the 1890s, and financed the Madison Cooking School. By 1902 gas appliances were in over half the homes in the city.

Construction at the complex has been ongoing:

- In 1902 MG&E built the powerhouse that still stands, placing it on block 131 where the Madison City Gas Light and Coke Co. had its plant. The new 1902 building was designed by Madison architects Louis Claude and Edward Starck - a Neo-classical-style structure in red brick, with brick pilasters on a concrete basement. Round-arched windows led up to an entablature with a denticulated cornice and pediment. That first power-house held "the first gas-powered central station electric plant in the U.S.," an experiment that ended in 1915.
- In 1909 the east section of the Pressure House was built, possibly as a stable.
- In 1915 the generator house was remodeled to hold two steam-powered generators. The remodel was designed by Madison engineers Daniel Mead and Charles Seastone, and largely preserved Claude & Starck's Neoclassical facade. A 56-foot high boiler house was added at the same time, designed to hold three coal-fired boilers. Around this time the circular brick discharge wet well was also added.

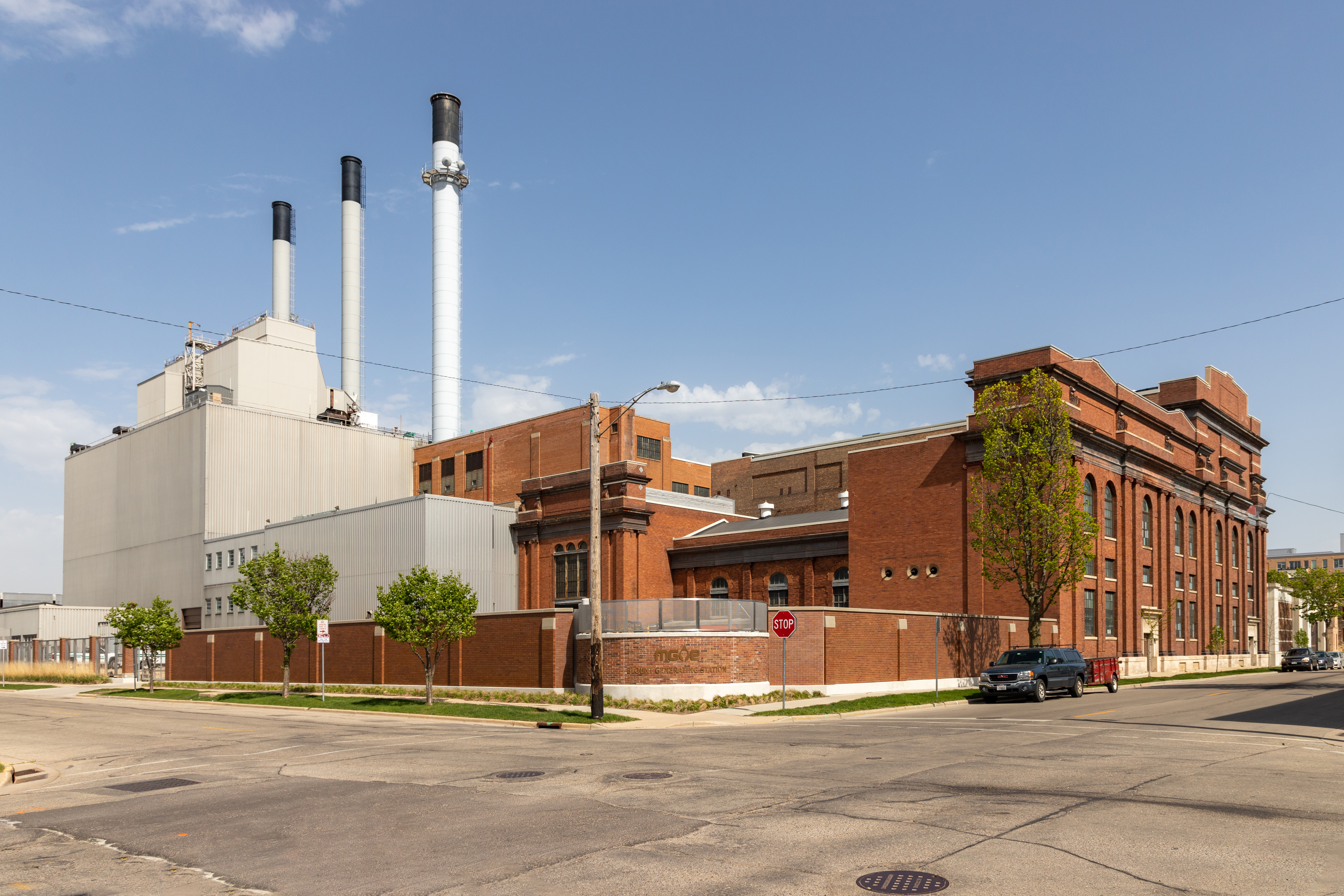
The complex in 2021. The NRHP site is on the right - primarily the 1902 powerhouse.

- In 1923 a small addition was made to the boiler house with a huge chimney.
- The following year James and Edward Law designed three more buildings: a water gas building, a liquid purification building, and a works utility building. Only the last remains.
- Other expansions took place in the 40s and 50s.

MG&E expanded into electrical appliances in the 1920s, promoting them in a magazine sent to customers. Marketing expanded in the 1930s to send a saleswoman to rural areas to demonstrate appliances. By 1939 MG&E employed 270, and served 18,262 gas customers and 23,978 electric customers. In 1944 American Light and Traction sold the company to its employees and to local investors. As of 2001, MG&E provided electricity to 125,000 customers and natural gas to 112,000, reaching as far as Crawford County.
