= Kevin R. Slates =

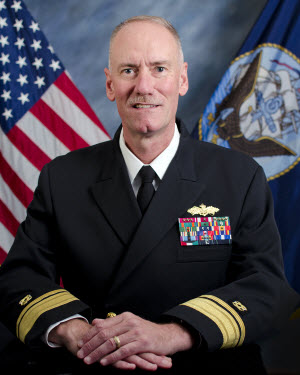
Official portrait

Kevin Robert Slates (born 1959) is a retired Rear Admiral in the United States Navy.

== Early life and education ==
Slates is a native of Pewaukee, Wisconsin. He attended Marquette University, earning his bachelor's degree in 1982. Slates holds an M.S. degree in environmental engineering from the University of Maryland, College Park and has completed the Advanced Management Program at the Fuqua School of Business of Duke University.

== Career ==
Slates received his commission in 1982. His duties would include commanding Naval Mobile Construction Battalion Three, deployments to serve in the Gulf War and as part of the Kosovo Force, being stationed at Marine Corps Base Camp Lejeune and being assigned to Naval Facilities Engineering Command and the staff of the Chief of Naval Operations.

He retired in 2015. Awards he received during his career include the Legion of Merit.
