= William Henry Washburn =

American politician

William Henry Washburn (June 1842 – March 24, 1916) was a member of the Wisconsin State Assembly.

== Biography ==
Washburn was born in June 1842, sources have differed on the exact date. During the American Civil War, he served with the 28th Wisconsin Volunteer Infantry Regiment of the Union Army. He was a travelling salesman by trade.

== Political career ==
Washburn was a member of the Assembly in 1879. Previously, he was a Supervisor of Pewaukee, Wisconsin in 1868. He was a Republican.
