= Madison Gas and Electric =

American energy company

- Headquarters: Madison, Wisconsin, U.S.
- Products: electricity, natural gas, green energy options
- Revenue: ▲$568 millions (2019)
- Number of employees: 731
- Website: www.mge.com

Madison Gas and Electric Company (MGE) is the primary subsidiary of MGE Energy, Inc. (Nasdaq: MGEE). As a regulated utility, it primarily serves the Madison, Wisconsin metropolitan area with electricity, gas and green energy options.

== History ==
The company's roots in the Madison area date back more than 150 years to its predecessor company, the Madison Gas Light and Coke Co., which was founded in 1855. The Madison Electric Light and Power Co. began delivering electric service in 1888. At the time, Madison had a population of 13,000.

In 1892, the Four Lakes Light and Power Co. bought Madison Electric Light and Power Co. and operated as Madison's electricity provider for the next four years.

In 1896, the Four Lakes Light and Power Company and the Madison City Gas Light and Coke Co. combined and incorporated to become Madison Gas and Electric Co.

The Madison Gas and Electric Company Powerhouse was built in 1902. In 1915, it was remodeled at a cost of $150,000. The building was designated a landmark by the Madison Landmarks Commission in 2002. The main offices of MGE are located in a complex surrounding the former Chicago and North Western Railway station in Madison.

In 2001, the company formed a holding company named MGE Energy, Inc. and Madison Gas and Electric Co. became its main subsidiary.

In 2021, Morgan Stanley described MGE as one of the four American electric utilities with both "the best exposure to renewables growth" and with a large proportion of transmission in their asset base, putting them in a position to benefit from US Department of Energy proposals to ease development and increase incentives for transmission projects.

In 2021, MGE proposed lowering the minimum monthly bill for residential customers from $19 per month to $15 per month, and raising rates to cover the new lower minimum charge, stating that it would reward customers who used less electricity. The average residential customer will pay about $4.10 more per month for electricity in 2022, which is slightly less than the impact of the original 5.9% rate hike MGE requested.

== Electricity ==
The company owns, operates and manages electric generating facilities and electric distribution facilities. The utility serves 172,000 electric customers, including the city of Madison and some suburban communities in Dane County.

Owned generating facilities:

- Blount Generating Station on the Madison Isthmus, 100 MW (natural gas)
- West Campus Cogeneration Facility, 150 MW (natural gas)
- Elm Road Generating Station at Oak Creek, 100 MW from a shared 1,230 MW total capacity plant (coal), built in 2010
- Columbia Energy Center at Portage, Wisconsin, 1,100 MW (coal), planned for early retirement in 2025
- Natural gas combustion turbines. One at Marinette, Wisconsin, 83 MW, and five in Madison. These units are used to rapidly provide extra generation in times of heavy electric use. These are examples of a Simple cycle gas-turbine
- Biogas electricity in Dane County, 0.011 MWh (manure digester)
- Solar units at MGE's headquarters, on the roof of the City of Middleton Municipal Operations Center, at the Middleton Municipal Airport, at the Dane County Regional Airport and many smaller installations.
- The O'Brien Solar Fields, on Seminole Road in Fitchburg, 20 MW.
- (Proposed) Koshkonong Solar Center in Cambridge, Wisconsin and Deerfield, Wisconsin, And 300 MW
- Wind Farms, 153 MW, in Wisconsin (Kewaunee, Dodge, and Fond du Lac Counties) and Iowa (Worth County, and the cities of Kensett and Saratoga)

The company also has long-term electric purchase power agreements.

== Natural gas ==
The company purchases natural gas and owns distribution facilities to serve its customers. The utility serves 154,000 natural gas customers throughout the city of Madison, some suburban communities in Dane County and six other Wisconsin counties.

== Green energy options ==
MGE has a green energy program called Green Power Tomorrow. Customers have the option of purchasing renewable energy for their home and/or business.
