= Ricardo González (politician) =

American politician (born 1946)

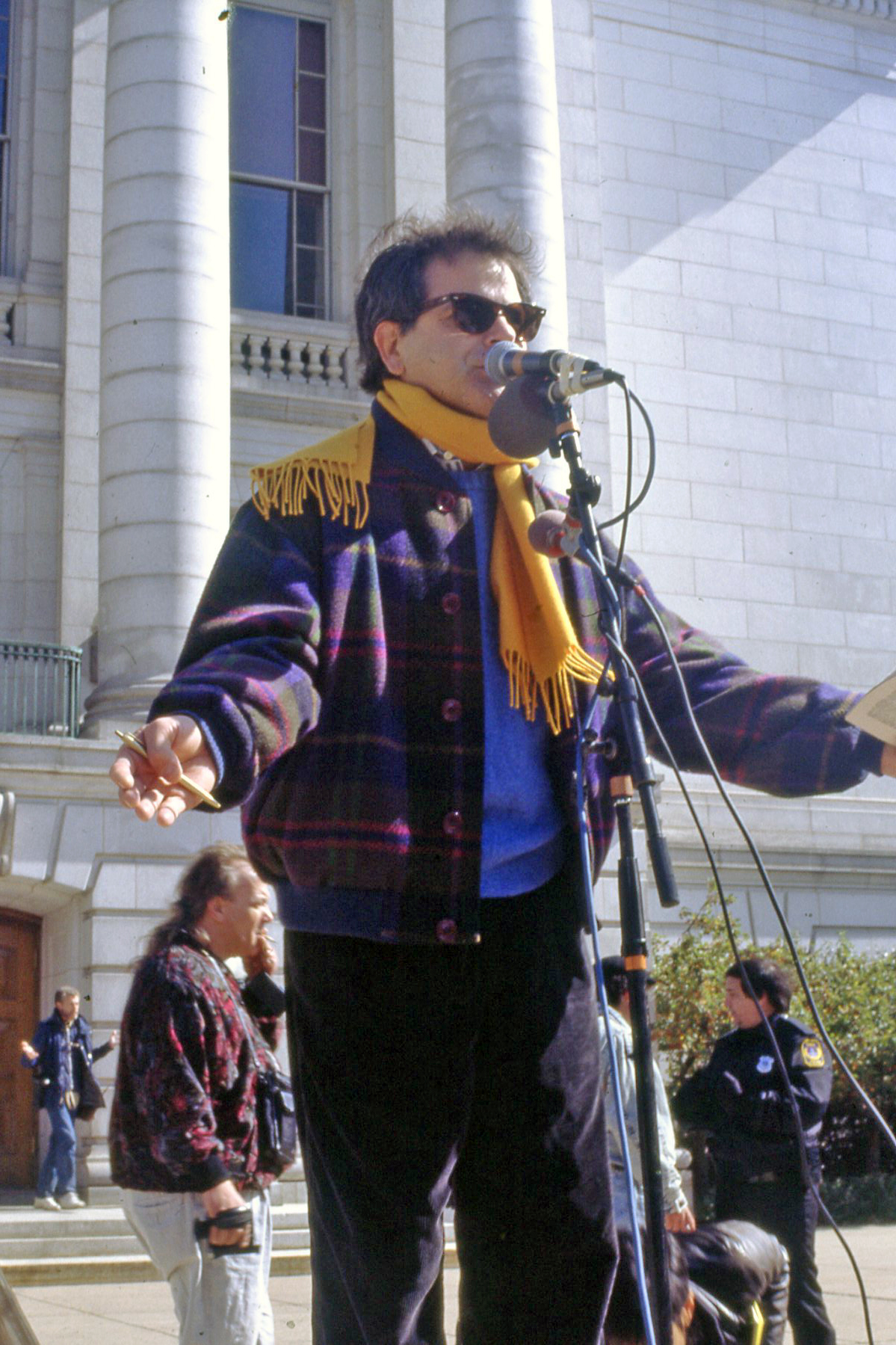
González at the 1991 Madison, Wisconsin Gay Pride parade

Ricardo González (born 1946 in Cuba) is an American politician. He is a former member of the Madison Common Council and the first openly gay Latino elected to public office in the United States. González is the Past President of the Cuban Committee for Democracy.

== Advocacy and public office ==
In 1974, González opened a bar called The Cardinal which became a gay-friendly venue of choice for fundraisers for both liberal politicians and various causes. At the time, González was an affirmative action officer with the State of Wisconsin appointed by then Governor of Wisconsin Patrick Lucey. Gonzales served on the board of "The United," a gay organization, and as a counselor at the now-defunct Gay Center in Madison. He has also been a long-time supporter of the Madison AIDS Support Network.

In 1989, González was elected to the Madison Common Council representing District 4.

=== Common Council (1989-2000) ===
During his time on the council, González helped establish Madison's sister city relationship with the Cuban city of Camagüey. González played an instrumental role in the creation of the Monona Terrace Convention Center. Foremost on González's agenda as alderman was the revitalization of Downtown Madison.

== Legacy ==
González' papers are housed in the UW-Madison historic archives. In 2011, González was awarded with the Martin Luther King Jr. Legacy Award.
