= Franklin Street station (Wisconsin) =

Franklin Street

General information
- Location: 501 East Wilson Street, Madison, Wisconsin 53703
- System: Former Milwaukee Road passenger rail station

History
- Opened: 1869
- Closed: 1952

Former Services
Preceding station	Milwaukee Road	Following station
Madison Terminus	Madison – Milwaukee via Watertown	Sun Prairie toward Milwaukee
Madison Terminus	Madison – Portage	DeForest toward Portage
- Milwaukee Road Depot
- Location: 640 West Washington Avenue, Madison, Wisconsin, United States
- Built: 1869

The Franklin Street station, also known as East Madison station, was a Milwaukee Road station. It was located at 501 East Wilson Street, one block west from the C&NW station. The first station on the site was built in 1869. This was replaced with a 1886 structure in a Victorian Gothic style, to compete with the new C&NW station. It served trains from Madison to Portage and Milwaukee, including the On Wisconsin. The station was demolished in 1952, and all Milwaukee Road passenger service shifted to the still-standing West Madison station.
