= Franklin Street Park =

Park in Cambridge, Massachusetts, US

Coordinates: 42°22′03.27″N 71°06′37.99″W

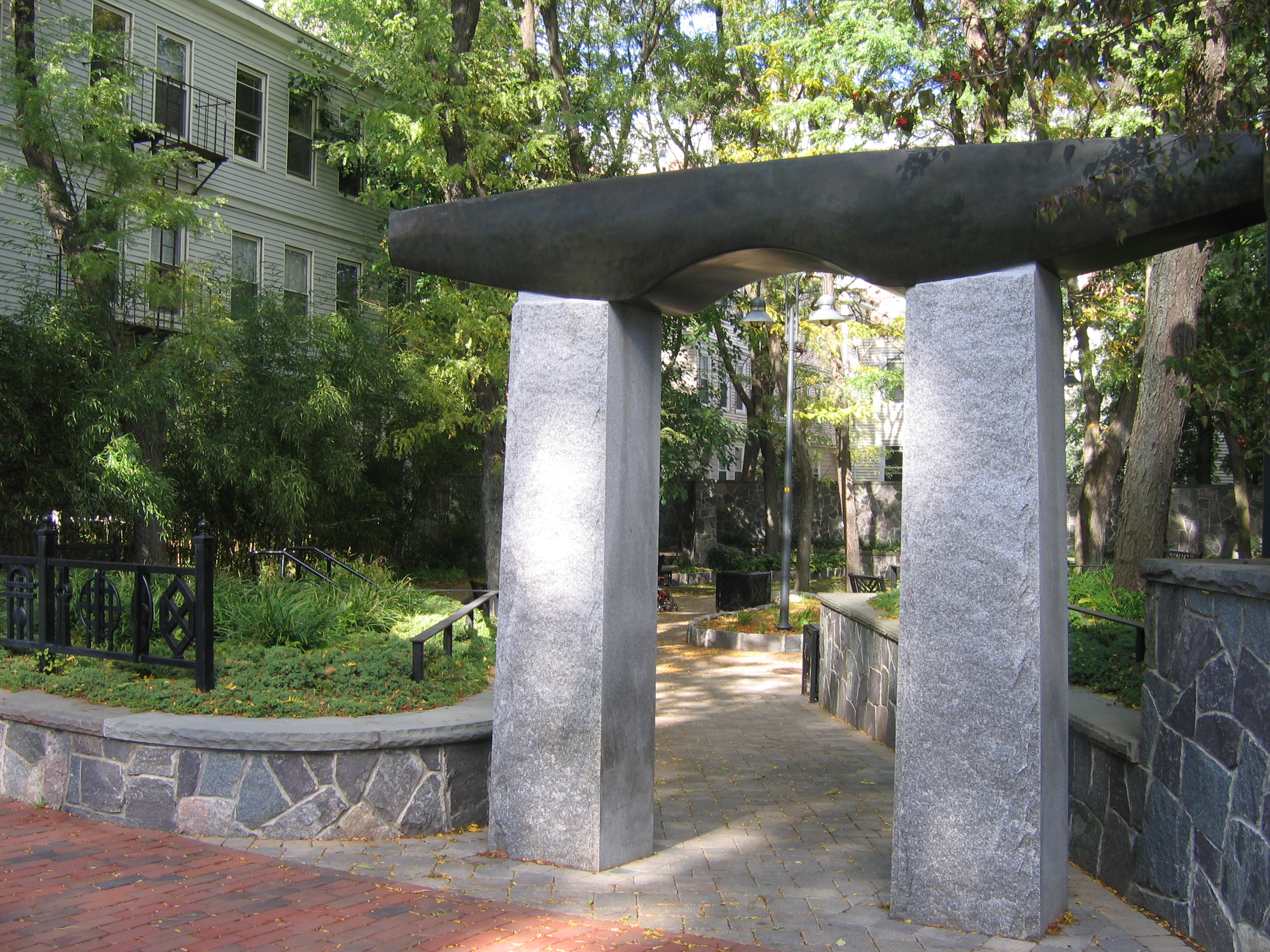
Entrance to the Franklin Street Park

Franklin Street Park is an urban neighborhood park in Cambridge, Massachusetts. The park is a house-sized lot in the Riverside neighborhood on 495 Franklin Street between Bay Street and Hancock Street.

== History ==
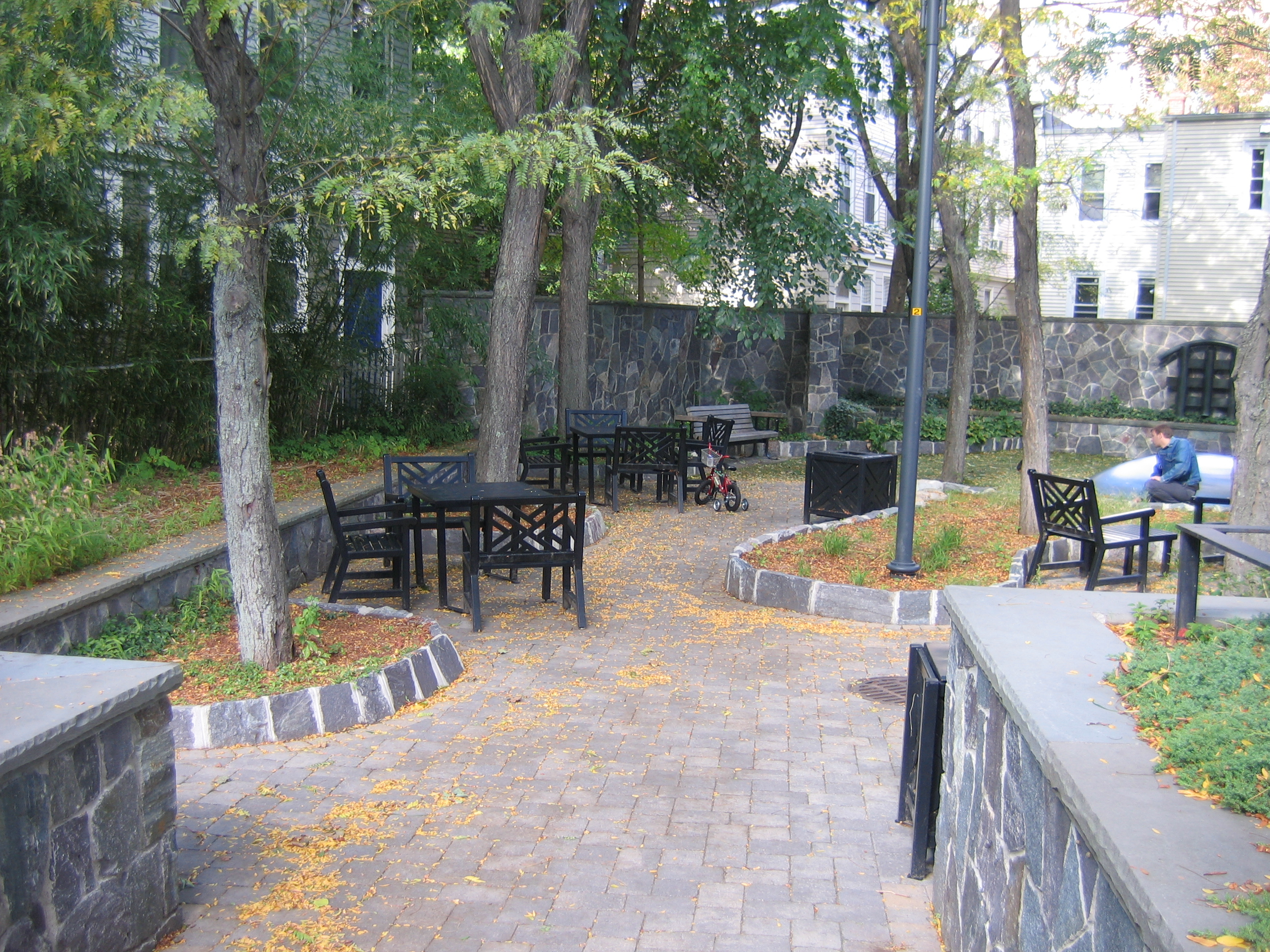
Interior of the Franklin Street Park

The site that the park now inhabits used to be an unused area paved with concrete. The site measured 4,400 square feet (410 m^{2}), which downsloped from the street into a dark and overgrown plot that had become a campsite for the homeless.

To improve this situation the Cambridge Community Development Department began renovations in 2002. These renovations had the stated goal of transforming the park into a small urban oasis.

The Cambridge Community Development Department finished renovations in 2003.

== Awards ==
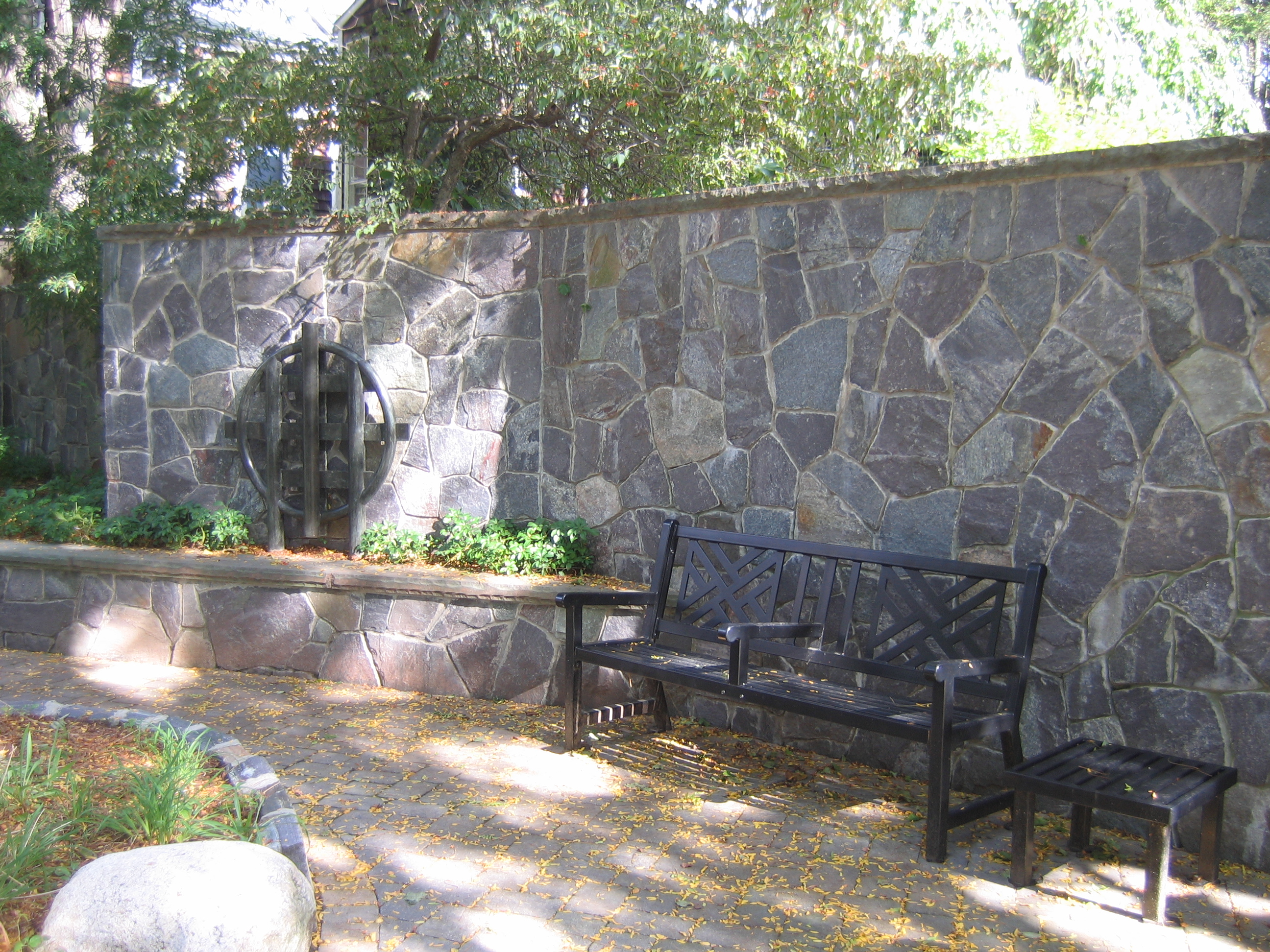
Bench and table in Franklin Street Park

The American Society of Landscape Architects in its national publication Landscape Architecture bestowed upon the park its "Editor's Choice" award in its July 2004 issue. They granted the award in part for the incorporation of sculptures in the park's design.
