= Franklin Street Terminal =

Rapid transit station in Chicago, 1895–1897

FRANKLIN ST. TERMINAL
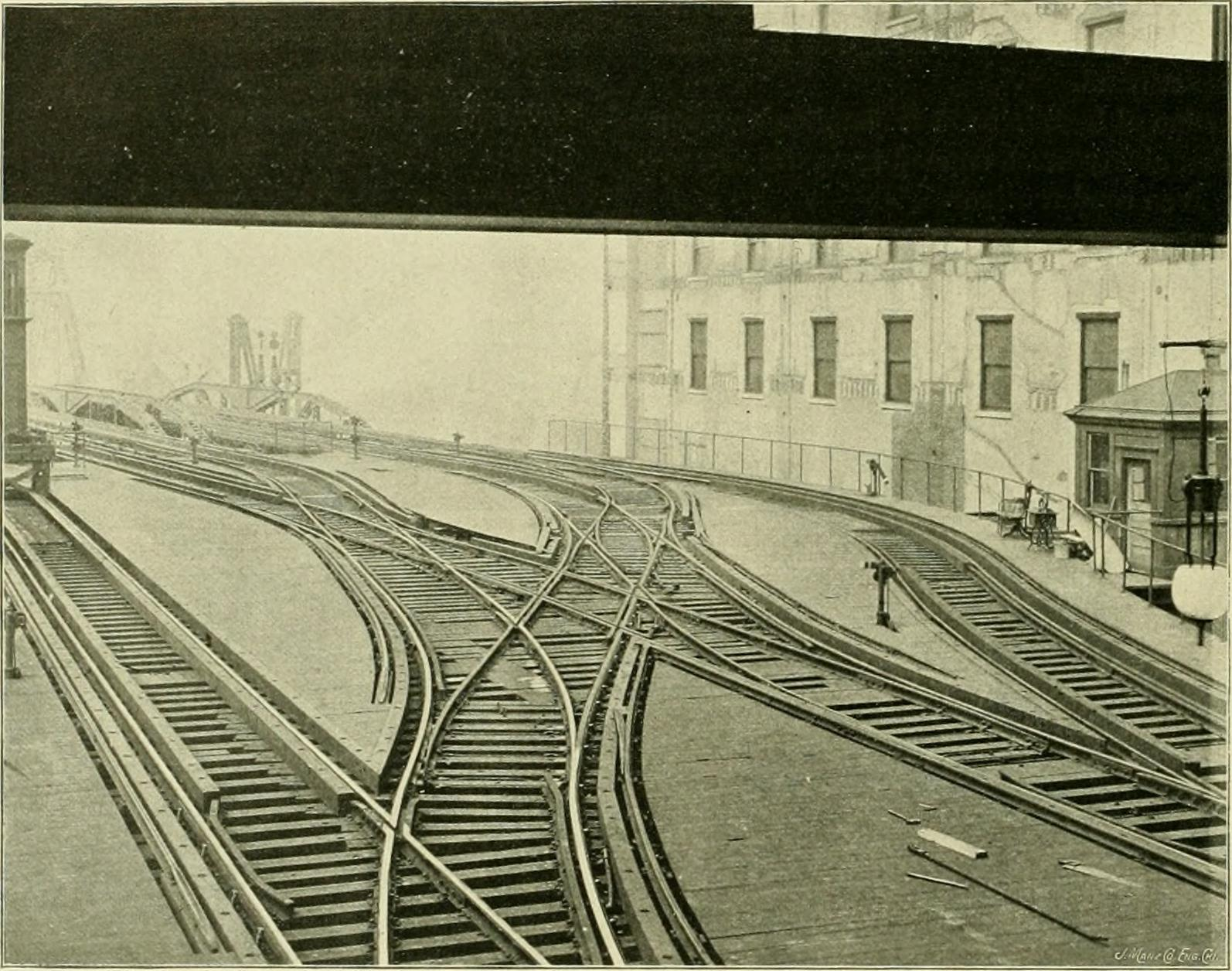
- The tracks leading from the Franklin Street Terminal

General information
- Location: 258–260 S. Franklin Street; Chicago, Illinois (Note: This would be 314 S. Franklin Street under modern street numbering.)
- System: Former Chicago 'L' rapid transit station
- Owner: Metropolitan West Side Elevated Railroad Company
- Line: Metropolitan main line
- Tracks: 2, branching out to 4 with a siding for motor cars

Construction
- Structure type: Elevated

History
- Opened: May 17, 1895
- Closed: October 11, 1897

Former services
Preceding station	Chicago "L"	Following station
Canal toward Marshfield	Metropolitan main line	Terminus

The Franklin Street Terminal was a rapid transit station on the Chicago "L" that was the eastern terminus of the Metropolitan West Side Elevated Railroad from 1895 to 1897. The Metropolitan had intended to construct its eastern end at Fifth Avenue, a block east of Franklin Street, but right-of-way acquisition costs had proven prohibitive so it settled on Franklin Street to house its terminal and offices. Rather than demolish the buildings on the site, the company opted to gut their second and third floors and run its tracks through them.

The Metropolitan began service in 1895, although use of the Franklin Street Terminal would be delayed by a week and a half. The Loop, an elevated railroad structure connecting the downtown "L" lines, opened in 1897. The Metropolitan routed all its through the Loop and closed the terminal, which became the second shortest-lived station in "L" history. While the terminal was itself likely demolished soon afterwards, the infrastructure built to accommodate it would remain in use until the mid-20th century.

Closing the terminal created issues as the Loop frequently overflowed, leading to the railroad needing a new terminal to accommodate excess traffic. This terminal, which opened in 1904, was built at Fifth Avenue, the location that had been desired all along.

== History ==
The Metropolitan West Side Elevated Railroad Company, one of several that built what would become the Chicago "L", was granted a 50-year franchise by the Chicago City Council on April 7, 1892, and began securing right-of-way shortly thereafter. As designed, the Metropolitan's operations would comprise a main line that went west from downtown to Marshfield, where three branches – one northwest to Logan Square, one due west to Garfield Park, and one southwest to Douglas Park – would diverge and serve various parts of Chicago's west side. A further branch to Humboldt Park would proceed due west from the Logan Square branch just past Robey Street. (Note: Technically, the Logan Square branch started after Robey and was, like the Humboldt Park branch, a divergence from what was formally known as the "Northwest branch". However, as early as 1898, even the Metropolitan itself was referring to the Northwest branch as part of the "Logan Square branch".) Unlike the competing South Side and Lake Street Elevateds, the Metropolitan never used steam traction, although it had originally intended to and had built much of its structure under the assumption that locomotives would be used, deciding only in May 1894 to have electrified tracks instead. Thus, upon its opening, it was the first electric elevated railroad in the United States. The Metropolitan's tracks on the Logan Square branch were finished up to Robey by the middle of October 1894, and were powered in April 1895 for test and inspection runs.

The franchise had authorized the railroad to go as far east as Fifth Avenue downtown. Acquiring property for the right-of-way proved expensive, so the Metropolitan decided to trim its line back one block to Franklin Street, two blocks, or 400 feet (120 m), east of the Chicago River. Even with this cost-saving measure, this segment proved to be one of the most expensive for the Metropolitan to build. There were two multi-story office buildings in the block between Market and Franklin, one on each street, which were preserved. The second and third floors of the two buildings were gutted in order to provide space for the terminal. The Metropolitan then used the Franklin Street building's upper floors for its offices, and the floors above the terminal in the Market Street building were leased out by the Metropolitan to tenants.

The Metropolitan began service at 6 a.m. on Monday, May 6, 1895, between Robey on the Logan Square branch and Canal on the main line just west of the river. Work on the bridge crossing the river delayed the opening of Franklin Street Terminal to May 17.

The Metropolitan's lines were originally operated by the West Side Construction Company, which had been responsible for constructing them, and would be transferred to the Metropolitan on October 6, 1896. The backers and officers of the two companies were largely identical, so this transfer of ownership was nominal. The expenses incurred in constructing the Metropolitan's vast trackage would come back to haunt the company, which entered receivership on January 20, 1897, after failing to pay the West Side company interest of $37,500 ($1,221,500 in 2021). The receiver chosen was Dickinson MacAllister, the Metropolitan's civil engineer and one of its directors.

=== Closure ===
The Metropolitan's president, R. E. Jenkins, met with the presidents of the South Side, Lake Street, and Northwestern Elevateds – the other companies that became the Chicago "L" – on December 19, 1894. The officers agreed to drop their attempts at improving their downtown terminals and instead use the Union Elevated Railroad Company's planned railroad loop to link their operations.

The Loop, as it would be called, opened on October 11, 1897. The Franklin Street Terminal closed on that date, and all trains were routed to the Loop. It has been speculated that the terminal's closure was due to the cramped space the station and its infrastructure occupied between Franklin Street and the Chicago River. This makes the terminal the second-shortest lived station in the history of the "L", behind only the Jackson Park station open during a few months in 1893.

The Metropolitan transferred its rights to the terminal, previously perpetual, to the West Side Construction Company as payment for more dues in March 1898.

The Loop soon overflowed, and the Metropolitan had to use stub tracks past Canal to turn back excess trains. These Canal-ending trains benefited workers of west side factories, who were not bound for a trip to the Loop. In 1904, a terminal on Fifth Avenue was built to accommodate the need for an additional station.

== Station details ==
Pictures of the interior of the station are not known to exist given the brevity of its existence. The station had two tracks, which branched into four tracks immediately outside the station. Train traffic was managed from an interlocking tower on the south side of the tracks. A steel framework 40 feet (12 m) high was built to support the tower. A 1-inch (25 mm) pipe laid on double anti-friction pipe carriers connected the switches, locks and signals. Every 24 hours, there was movement of 1,286 trains containing a total of 2,794 cars. The design of the interlocking was well-received; the Railway Age remarked in 1896 that "[t]he value and benefits of a complete system of interlocking and signaling ... are nowhere more manifest than at the east terminal of the Metropolitan Elevated railroad of Chicago."

The interior of the station had two tracks surrounded by three platforms total, each of which could seat five cars. The station's trackage totaled 34 operational levers and ten spares. Towers were present on both sides of the Chicago River to operate the drawbridge, which was designed by engineer William Scherzer to accommodate the narrowness of the river at the point. The bridge was actually two bridges side-by-side, each carrying a pair of tracks.

Unlike the competing South Side and Lake Street Elevateds, the Metropolitan never used steam traction; although it had originally intended to, and had built much of its structure under the assumption that locomotives would be used, it decided in May 1894 to have electrified tracks instead, making it upon its opening the first electric elevated railroad in the United States. The bridge was designed so that electric current would be cut off when it was open, which combined with the incline of the open drawbridge prevented a train from running off if a motorman failed to stop.

== Works cited ==
- Borzo, Greg (2007). The Chicago "L". Arcadia. ISBN 9780738551005 – via Google Books.
- Moffat, Bruce G. (1995). The "L": The Development of Chicago's Rapid Transit System, 1888–1932. Chicago: Central Electric Railfans' Association. ISBN 0-915348-30-6.
- "Signaling and Interlocking in Chicago–No. VII: A Description of the Metropolitan West Side Elevated Railroad Plant at Franklin Street Station". The Railway Age. 22 (12). Chicago: 223. September 18, 1896.
- "The Metropolitan West Side Elevated Railroad of Chicago". The Street Railway Review. 5: 263–274. January 15, 1895.
