= Betty Brinn Children's Museum =

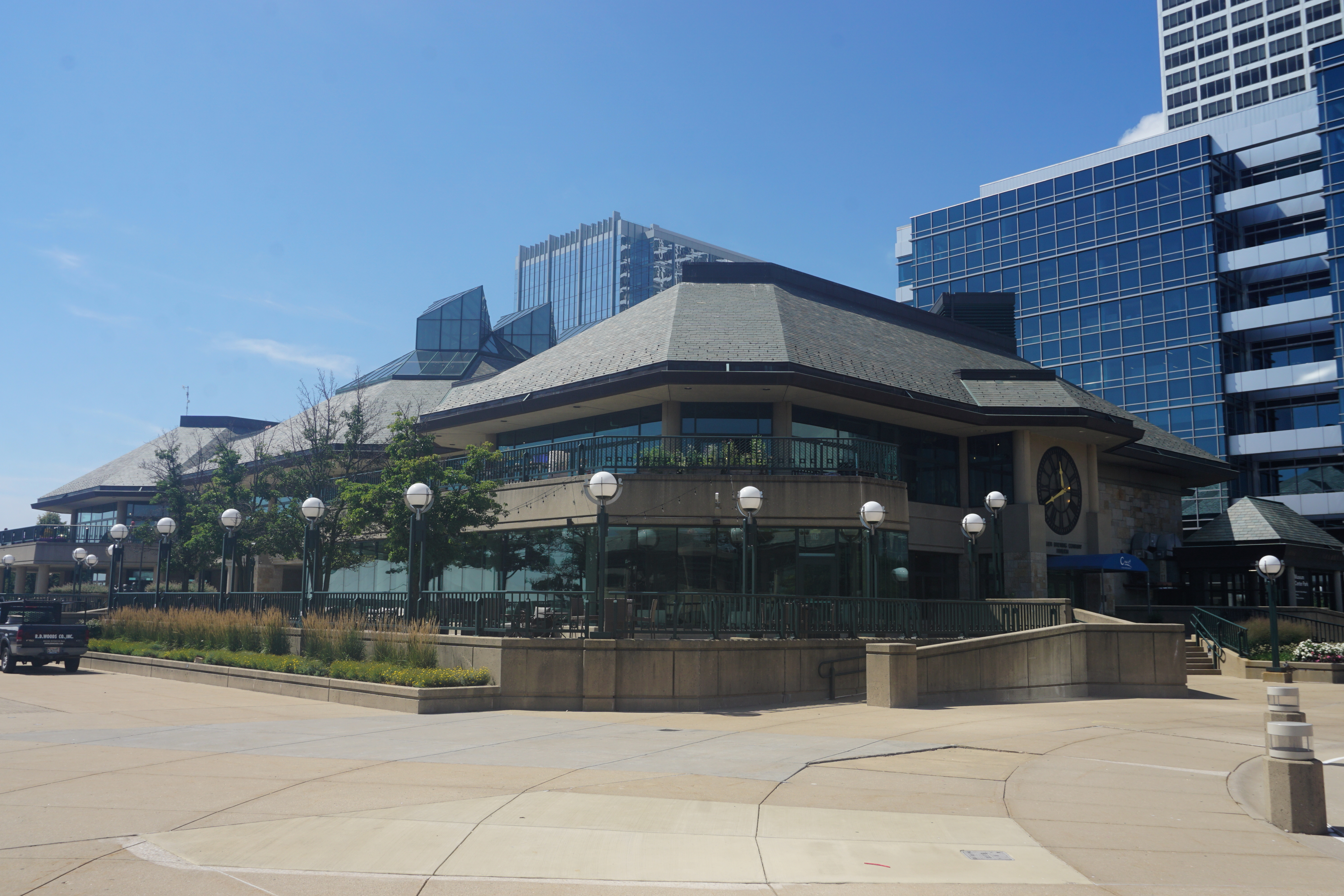
- Established: March 30, 1995
- Location: 929 E Wisconsin Ave, Milwaukee, WI 53202, USA
- Coordinates: 43.038542°N 87.899679°W
- Type: Children's Museum
- Public transit access: MCTS
- Parking: O'Donnell Park Parking Structure
- Website: www.bbcmkids.org

The Betty Brinn Children's Museum is a non-profit children's museum located in Milwaukee, Wisconsin.

== About the Museum ==
The museum is a "hands-on" exhibit based educational museum primarily targeted for children between the ages of 1 and 10. It includes interactive spaces, such as the grocery store in the "Home Town" exhibit, the space to play in the "Kohl's Healthy Kids: It's Your Move!" and the design workshop in the "Be a Maker (BAM) space."

== History ==
The museum was founded by three women, Therese Binder, Susie Gruenberg and Julie Sattler-Rosene. They raised community funds and were able to open the museum after six years. The official ribbon cutting was on March 30, 1995, and the doors opened to the public on April 4, 1995.

It is named for Betty Brinn, the founder of Managed Health Services. She grew up in over 15 foster homes, so when she became successful, she worked to help low-income women and children get medical insurance and care.

On September 11, 2020, the museum announced plans to relocate to a leased space in Milwaukee Public Museum's new campus along N. Sixth St, between W. McKinley Ave and W. Vliet St. on a site 1 block north of Fiserv Forum. The plans were later dropped in early 2022 due to budget concerns.
