= Madison station (Chicago and North Western Railway) =

Former train station in Madison, Wisconsin

Madison
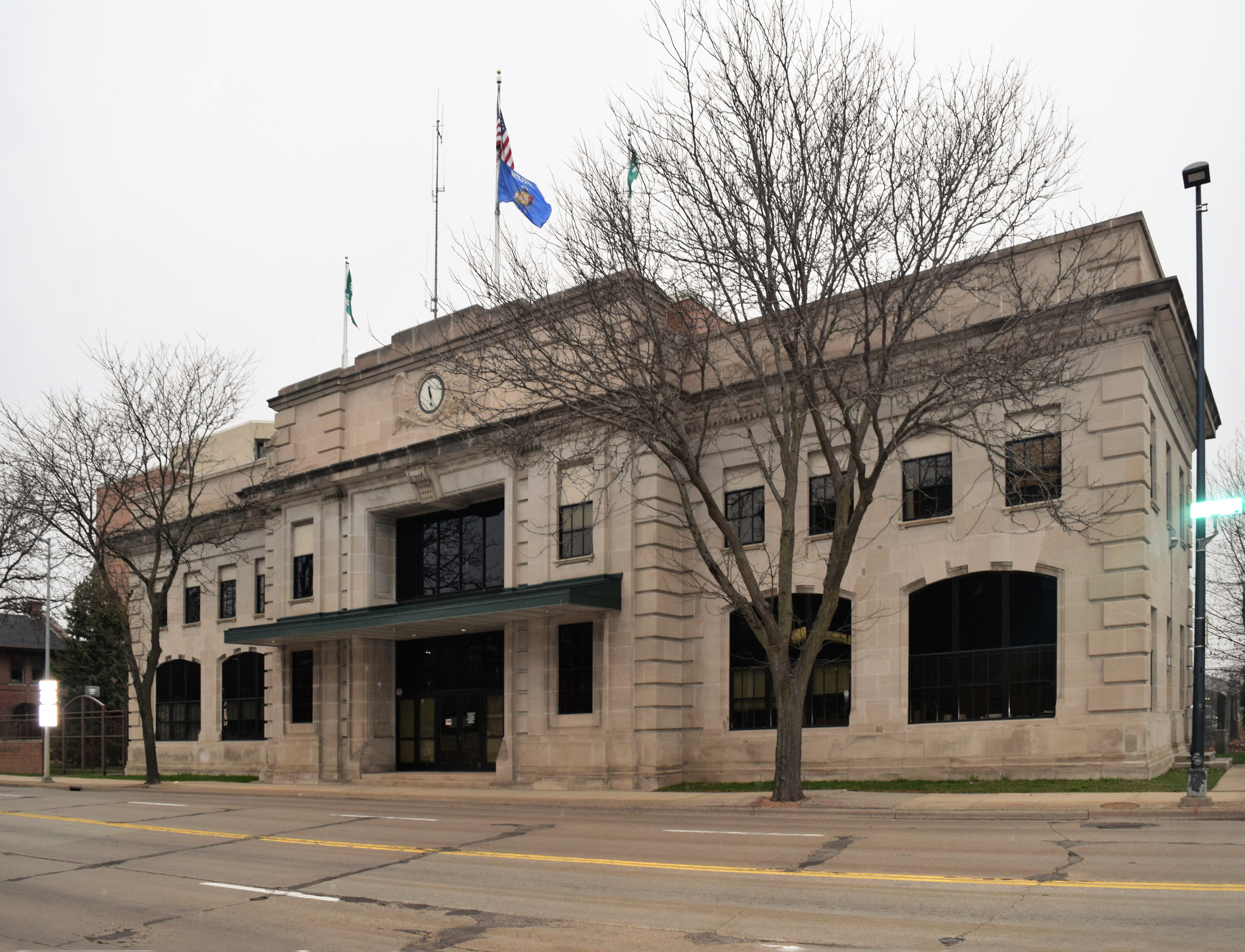
- The front of the station in 2020

General information
- Location: 201 South Blair Street; Madison, Wisconsin
- Coordinates: 43.076604°N 89.375677°W
- System: Former Chicago and North Western Railway station
- Owner: Chicago and North Western Railway (1871–1965); Madison Gas and Electric (1965–present)
- Platforms: 3 island platforms (none remain)
- Tracks: 5 (1 remains)

Construction
- Structure type: At-grade
- Architect: Frost & Granger
- Architectural style: Neoclassical

History
- Opened: 1871
- Closed: 1965
- Rebuilt: 1885, 1910

Former services
Preceding station	Chicago and North Western Railway	Following station
Mendota toward Minneapolis	Chicago – Minneapolis via Madison	Oregon toward Chicago
Terminus	Madison – Milwaukee	Cottage Grove toward Milwaukee
Verona toward Lancaster	Lancaster – Madison	Terminus
- Chicago and North Western Railway, Passenger and Freight Depots
- U.S. Historic district – Contributing property
- Location within Wisconsin
- Coordinates: 43.076604°N 89.375677°W
- Part of: East Wilson Street Historic District (ID86000618)
- Added to NRHP: April 3, 1986
Location

Madison station is a former railroad station in Madison, Wisconsin. The station served passenger and freight trains of the Chicago and North Western Railway (C&NW). Passenger service ended in 1965 and the passenger station and freight depot was bought by Madison Gas and Electric (MGE) and has been renovated to serve as offices. The station and freight depot are listed as contributing properties on the National Register of Historic Places East Wilson Street Historic District. The Chicago, Milwaukee, St. Paul and Pacific Railroad (commonly known as the Milwaukee Road) had tracks paralleling the C&NW and also had a nearby passenger station that outlasted the C&NW station as an active station by several years.

== History ==
=== Early depots ===
The first railroad entering Madison was the Milwaukee and Mississippi Railroad, a predecessor of the Milwaukee Road. Their depot was established on the west side of Madison in 1854. The Chicago and North Western constructed a line to Madison in 1864 from the south, crossing Monona Bay. The first passenger station on the site was established in 1871. Due to the proximity of the Milwaukee Road, the C&NW originally wanted to construct a union station in the area. The Milwaukee Road declined and built its own depot nearby, known as East Madison.

Madison eventually became a junction point for the Chicago and North Western, as lines were completed north to Baraboo and Minneapolis. Other lines to Lancaster and Milwaukee were completed in the early 1880s. A new station was completed in the same location in 1885, and included a hotel and dining room within the structure.

=== Current depot ===
After the opening of a new Milwaukee Road depot in West Madison, the C&NW made plans for a new larger station, costing $500,000. Leaders in the government of Madison were in support of the plan, but nearby business owners and residents objected. These objections were due to the plan that would close the crossing of Blount Street to allow for expanded platforms. A series of legal proceedings ending up costing 10 years before the C&NW revised plans.

The scaled-down station opened in 1910, at a cost of $250,000, and the Blount Street crossing remains open to this day. A freight depot was also built c. 1908, just northwest of the station. The new station was a success, and was described in 1915 as a "bustling, buzzing, exciting hub of activity." The station served local and named passenger trains, such as the Duluth–Superior Limited, The Mountaineer, and The Viking. The Victory and the Viking, two Chicago-Minneapolis trains, made the trip from Chicago to Madison in a direct line, through Janesville. The Twin Cities 400 from Chicago–Minneapolis used the faster line (compared to the Victory or Viking) through Milwaukee, bypassing Madison to the north, with a connection to the Minnesota 400 at Wyeville.

With the introduction of streamliner trains, Madison was served by the Minnesota 400, later renamed the Dakota 400, Rochester 400 (later renamed Rochester Special; bound for Mankoto and St. Paul and Minneapolis) and the Duluth-Superior Limited (bound for those cities). At their latter 1940s and 1950s peak, the Minnesota 400 and Dakota 400 went as far west as Rapid City, South Dakota. The station was also used for special trains for University of Wisconsin football games.

Intercity passenger trains in the United States declined after World War II, with fierce competition from the automobile and airplanes. The Rochester 400 made its last run on July 23, 1963. This left Madison with only one C&NW operated train—an unnamed local train to Chicago. This too was discontinued on June 21, 1965. Madison Gas and Electric (MGE) bought the passenger and freight station later that month for $390,000. MGE moved their main offices to the complex in 1983, and renovated the interior, while keeping the exterior facade of the passenger station. The surrounding area was listed as a historic district in 1986, and the property was listed on the Wisconsin State Register of Historic Places in 1989.

== Site description ==
The 1910 station was built as a partial stub end terminal, with two through tracks connecting to the west. This configuration allowed for separate tracks that would be terminating at Madison, and avoided congestion. However, the geography of Madison still required trains from Milwaukee to perform a backup move in order to access the northern line to Minneapolis. The structure was designed by the firm Frost & Granger, who was notable for designing other railroad buildings such as the Chicago and North Western Terminal in Chicago. The two-story neoclassical structure was made from Bedford stone and was designed to be similar to the Chicago terminal.

The nearby freight depot was built on the corner of Blair and Railroad Streets. It is two stories tall and made from red brick, with large rounded windows. A roundhouse was also built to the east of the station, and became notable when a boiler of a steam engine exploded in 1898. The two tracks of the C&NW intersected a single track of the Milwaukee Road with a unique diamond crossing within a grade crossing of Blair Street. Only one track currently remains, and is operated by the Wisconsin and Southern Railroad.

== Gallery ==
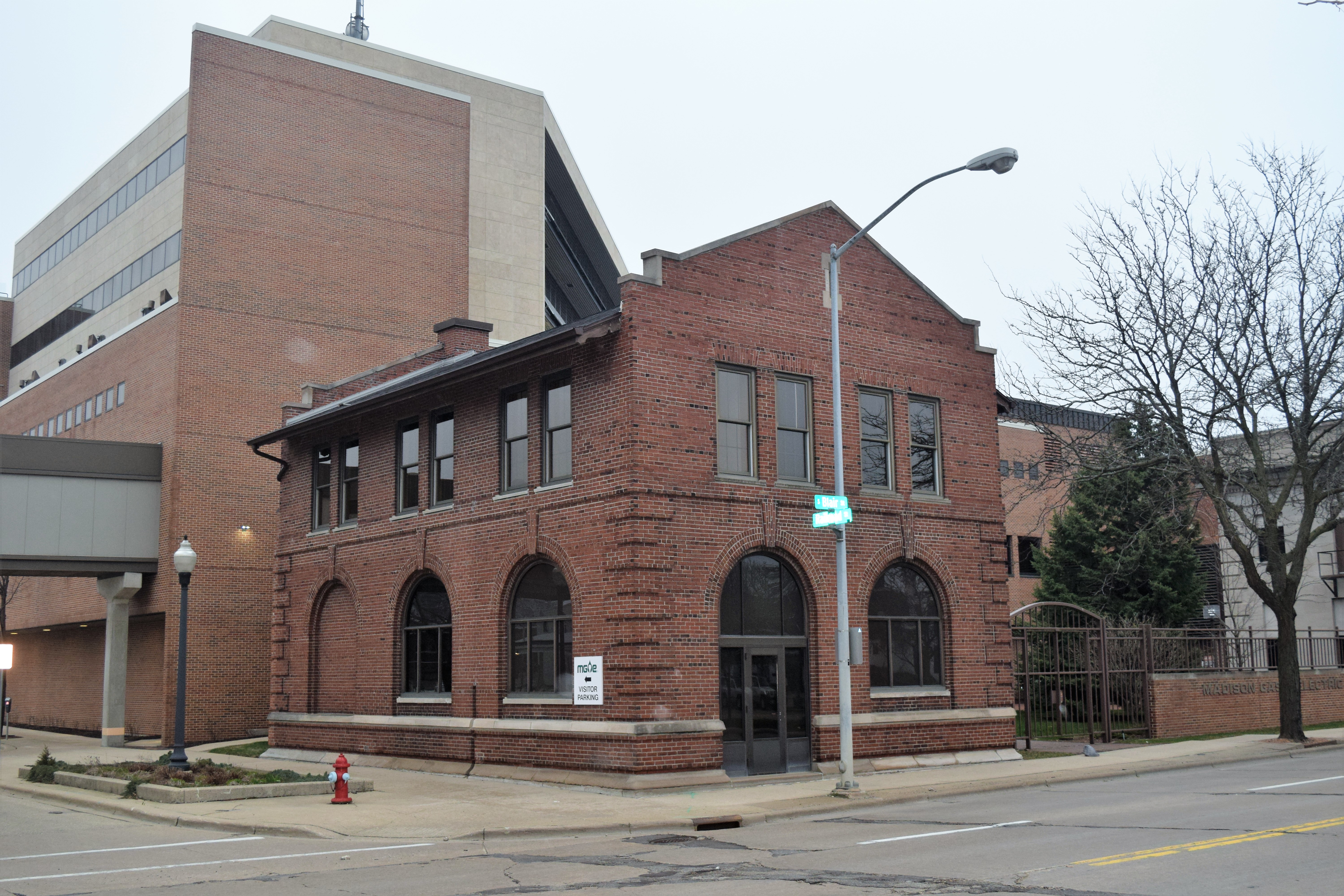
The freight depot, northwest of the station in 2020.

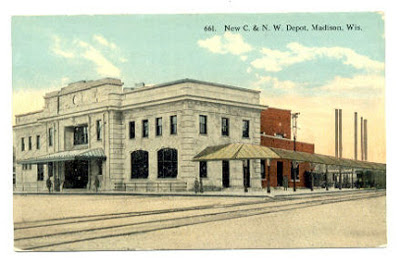
Postcard of station from the 1910s.
