= Everett Street Depot =

Coordinates: 43°02′11″N 87°54′52″W

Milwaukee Union Station
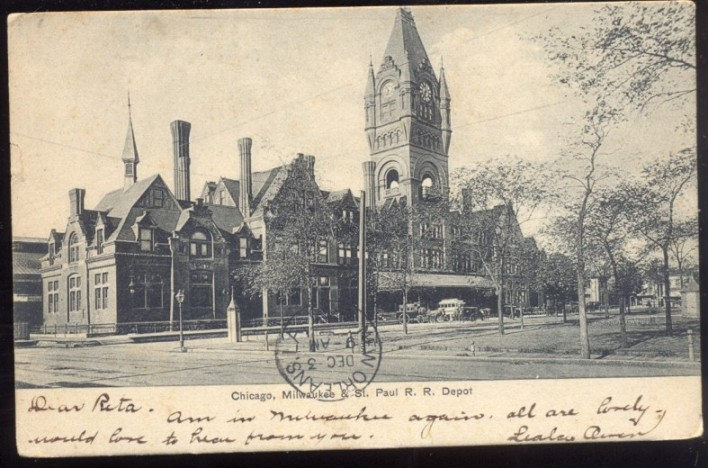
- Everett Street Depot on an old postcard

General information
- Location: West Everett Street between N. 2nd and N. 4th Streets; Milwaukee, Wisconsin

History
- Opened: 1886
- Closed: 1965

Former services
Preceding station	Milwaukee Road	Following station
Brookfield toward Seattle or Tacoma	Main Line	Sturtevant toward Chicago
Wauwatosa toward Madison	Madison – Milwaukee via Watertown	Terminus
Wauwatosa toward Madison	Madison – Milwaukee via Waukesha	Terminus
Terminus	Chicago – Milwaukee	Allis toward Chicago
Shorewood toward Ontonagon	Ontonagon – Milwaukee	Terminus
Location

Everett Street Station, also called Milwaukee Union Station, was a railway station located in downtown Milwaukee, Wisconsin, built by the Chicago, Milwaukee, St. Paul and Pacific Railroad (CMStP&P), commonly known as the Milwaukee Road. The station was located on West Everett Street between North 2nd Street and North 4th Street, and it featured a 140-foot-high clock tower—the largest in America at the time of construction. Designed by E. Townsend Mix in a "modern" functional style, the station combined the Gothic Revival style with elements drawing on Queen Anne and Romanesque Revival styles (such as stone archways) in an eclectic blend. Walter G. Berg gave a detailed description of the building in Buildings and Structures of American Railroads (1893).

The station faced the Fourth Ward Park (since renamed Zeidler Park), which afforded both a vantage point for viewing the station and a bucolic respite from the mechanized industrial culture of the railroad. The station served passengers from its opening in 1886 until it was replaced by Union Station (now Milwaukee Intermodal Station) on August 4, 1965. The station was damaged by fire a week after closing and razed the following year.

== Services ==
The Everett Street Station served as the home station of the Milwaukee Road, also serving the Wisconsin Central and Milwaukee Northern Railroads. The station was also home to the Milwaukee Road's Hiawatha passenger trains.

== Clock tower ==
After the clock tower had been lowered in the 1950s, the clock from the removed upper portion was installed to just above the roofline. Before demolition, one of the clock faces was removed and put into storage. It is now part of the Betty Brinn Children's Museum building, located at 929 E. Wisconsin Avenue in Milwaukee, which is very close to the site of the Chicago and North Western's razed Lakefront Depot.
