= Madison station (Milwaukee Road) =

Madison
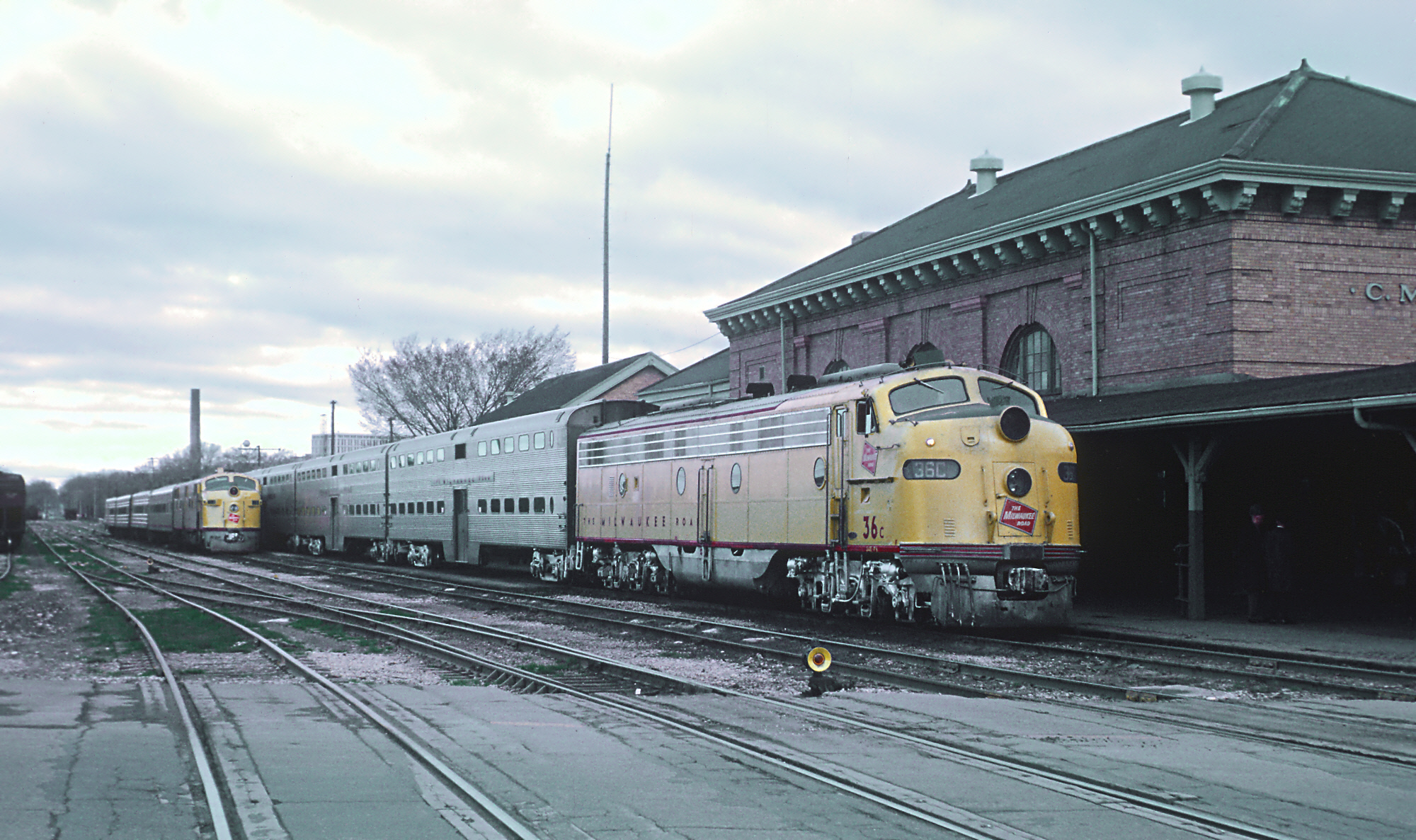
- Two passenger trains seen at the depot in May 1967.

General information
- Location: 640 West Washington Avenue, Madison, Wisconsin 53703
- System: Former Milwaukee Road passenger rail station

History
- Opened: 1903
- Closed: 1971

Former Services
Preceding station	Milwaukee Road	Following station
Middleton toward Rapid City	Rapid City – Madison	Terminus
Terminus	Madison – Milwaukee via Watertown	Franklin Street toward Milwaukee
Terminus	Madison – Milwaukee via Waukesha	Lake Waubesa toward Milwaukee
Terminus	Madison – Rondout	Lake Waubesa toward Rondout
Terminus	Madison – Portage	Franklin Street toward Portage
- Milwaukee Road Depot
- U.S. National Register of Historic Places
- Location within Wisconsin
- Location: 640 West Washington Avenue, Madison, Wisconsin, United States
- Coordinates: 43°04′05″N 89°23′40″W
- Area: 1.7 acres (0.69 ha)
- Built: 1903
- Architect: Frost & Granger
- NRHP reference No.: 85000990
- Added to NRHP: May 9, 1985
Location

The Milwaukee Road Depot in Madison, Wisconsin is a former railroad depot. It was built in 1903 and operated by the Chicago, Milwaukee, St. Paul and Pacific Railroad (Milwaukee Road). It served numerous passenger trains, including the Sioux and Varsity, and was located next to a major yard, turntable, and roundhouse. The station was one of two Milwaukee Road stations in Madison, and was also known as West Madison station or West Madison Depot to avoid confusion with Franklin Street station on the east side of Madison. All Milwaukee Road passenger service in Madison was consolidated to this station with the closing of Franklin Street in 1952. The Milwaukee Road's service from Chicago to Minneapolis-St. Paul traveled through Milwaukee and central Wisconsin, bypassing Madison to the north. The railroad's competitor, the Chicago and North Western Railroad, offered direct service northwest to Minneapolis.

== Passenger operations ==
In 1953 the station mainly served On Wisconsin and other trains east on a route to Watertown, Milwaukee and then to Chicago. Additionally, the timetables showed these named trains that took a direct path to Chicago, through Janesville:

- Sioux (a Chicago-Rapid City, SD night train)
- Varsity (a Chicago-Madison train; it left Madison in the morning and returned from Chicago in the evening)

== Eclipse of service ==
Rail service in Madison was terminated in 1971 when the Milwaukee Road opted to end all of its passenger operations. Only the main line between Chicago and Minneapolis had intercity rail after 1971.

== Current usage ==
The depot is now used as a shopping center; including a bicycle shop, a café, and a restaurant. MILW 35A, an EMD E9A locomotive, sits on static display outside of the depot along with several Milwaukee Road, New York Central Railroad, and Metropolitan Transportation Authority passenger cars. A single-tracked line operated by the Wisconsin and Southern Railroad remains in front of the depot.

The depot was listed on the National Register of Historic Places in 1985, and on the State Register of Historic Places in 1989.

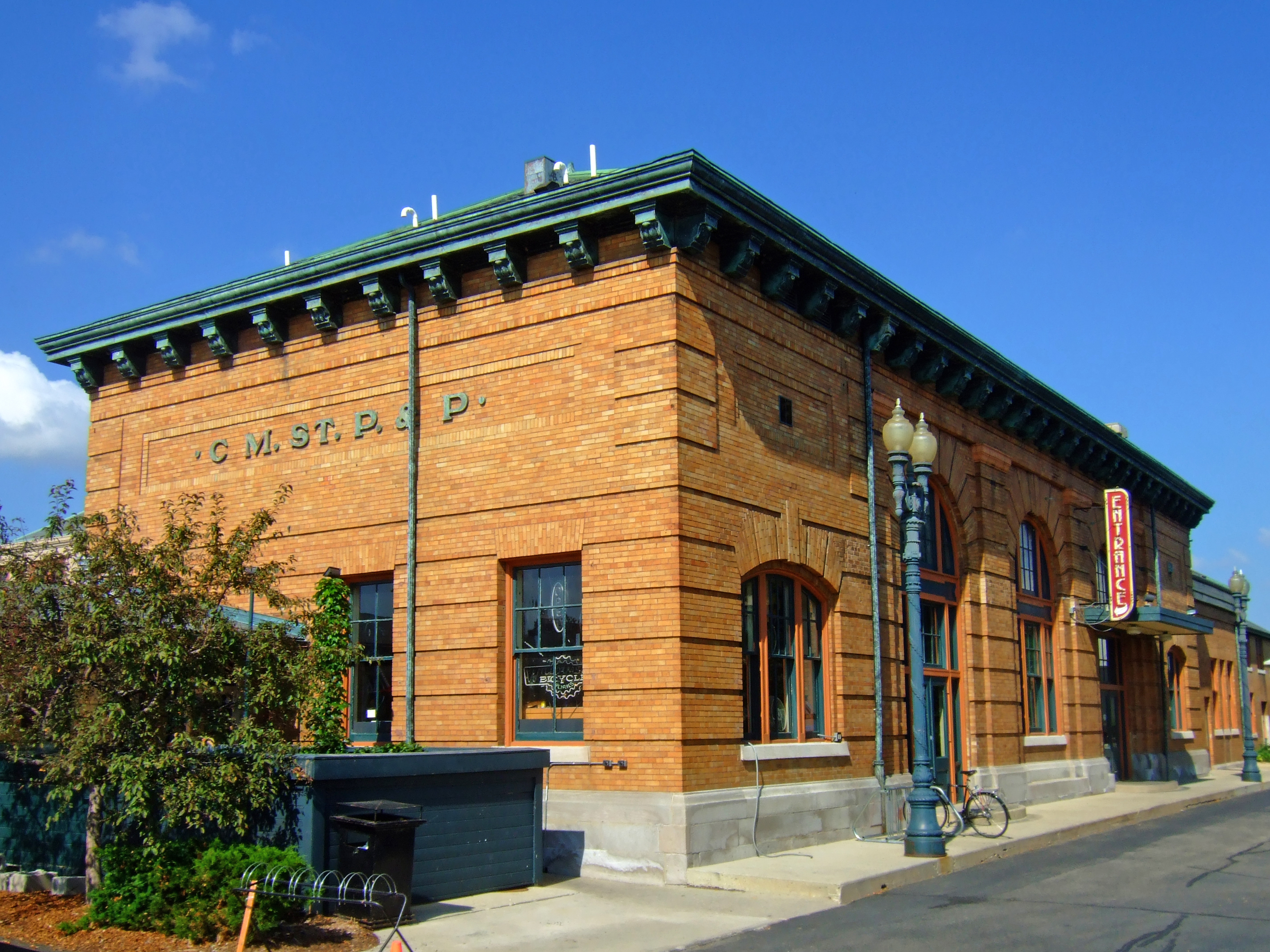
The historic depot with "CMStP&P" written on the outside
