= National Register of Historic Places listings in Waukesha County, Wisconsin =

Location of Waukesha County in Wisconsin

This is a list of the National Register of Historic Places listings in Waukesha County, Wisconsin. It is intended to provide a comprehensive listing of entries in the National Register of Historic Places that are located in Waukesha County, Wisconsin. The locations of National Register properties for which the latitude and longitude coordinates are included below may be seen in a map.

There are 157 properties and districts listed on the National Register in the county. Another 6 properties were once listed but have been removed.

This National Park Service list is complete through NPS recent listings posted September 11, 2026.

== Current listings ==
	Name on the Register	Image	Date listed	Location	City or town	Description
1	Sewall Andrews House	Sewall Andrews House	July 7, 1981 (#81000063)	103 Main Street; 42°51′42″N 88°19′57″W	Mukwonago	Andrews was a co-founder of Mukwonago who came from Vermont in 1836 to open a store and serve as a civic leader. In 1842 he built this modest but elegant Greek Revival home, one of the first brick homes in Waukesha County. Now a museum.
2	Arcadian Bottling Works	Arcadian Bottling Works	October 28, 1983 (#83004326)	900 North Hartwell Avenue; 43°00′44″N 88°13′20″W	Waukesha	Bottling factory complex begun in 1885 across the street from Arcadian Spring. The 2.5-story bottling house section was designed by Stephen Shipman, a rare application of Queen Anne style to an industrial building, with coursed ashlar walls, shingles in the gables, and a 3-story corner tower. Now apartments.
3	Arlington Apartments	Arlington Apartments	January 21, 1987 (#86003651)	309 Arlington Street; 43°00′23″N 88°13′55″W	Waukesha	3-story building containing 18 high-end apartments, built in 1928. The half-timbered facade is Tudor Revival style, popular in the 1920s.
4	Albert R. Baer House	Albert R. Baer House	September 21, 1988 (#88001645)	W166 N8990 Grand Avenue; 43°10′52″N 88°06′57″W	Menomonee Falls	Queen Anne-styled cottage built in 1893, with decorative shingles and sunburst designs in the gable ends, and a carriage house behind. Baer's family ran a general merchandise store and he served as village president.
5	Ralph C. Bailie House	Ralph C. Bailie House	December 8, 1986 (#86003407)	530 North Avenue; 43°06′39″N 88°20′40″W	Hartland	1-story Spanish Colonial Revival-styled stucco-clad house built in 1932, with curved parapet.
6	Bank of Hartland	Bank of Hartland	April 21, 1988 (#86003415)	112 East Capitol Drive; 43°06′17″N 88°20′49″W	Hartland	2-story bank built in 1894 (or 1906?), with the exterior remodeled in 1930 to Georgian Revival style, with elaborate lintels and quoins, in a design by Eschweiler & Eschweiler.
7	Barfoth-Blood Mound Group (47 WK 63)		September 2, 1982 (#82000720)	Address Restricted	Mukwonago	
8	Andrew Barnes House		September 21, 1988 (#88001652)	N89 W16726 Cleveland Avenue; 43°10′52″N 88°07′03″W	Menomonee Falls	Wooden Greek Revival-styled house built in 1858, with typical low-pitched roof and cornice returns. Andrew was a farmer who had migrated with his family from Lehigh County Pennsylvania in 1844. Moved from N89 W16840 Appleton Avenue in 1995.
9	Barney House	Barney House	October 28, 1994 (#94001250)	W264 S3641 Saylesville Road; 42°58′42″N 88°16′34″W	Waukesha	2-story brick-veneered hip-roofed Italianate-style house built in 1878, when it was surrounded by farmland. Built for George Barney, whose father Sebina was a blacksmith and bank founder. Behind is a Gothic Revival-styled carriage house.
10	Everett P. Barrett House	Everett P. Barrett House	February 24, 1995 (#95000140)	120 South Porter Avenue; 43°00′09″N 88°12′43″W	Waukesha	French Normandy-style house round corner tower and metal grillwork built in 1940. The walls of reinforced concrete were built by Barrett's own firm.
11	Beaumont Hop House	Beaumont Hop House	November 23, 1977 (#77000058)	Address Restricted	Hartland	Concrete-walled structure built in 1875, in which a stove below heated hop flowers drying above, at the end of the brief period when hops were grown in the state.
12	Becker and Schafer Store Building	Becker and Schafer Store Building	June 2, 1995 (#95000677)	1002-1004 White Rock Avenue; 43°00′48″N 88°13′33″W	Waukesha	2-story frame building with a boomtown front built in 1895 to house a general store below and an apartment above. Today it is the last clapboard-clad commercial building in the old downtown.
13	Big Bend Mound Group No. 2		December 19, 1978 (#78000146)	Address restricted	Big Bend	Group of tall conical mounds, probably built by Middle Woodland people. South of Big Bend.
14	Bishopstead	Bishopstead	March 1, 1984 (#84003803)	153 West Oakwood Drive; 43°04′23″N 88°25′06″W	Delafield	1846 home of Bishop Jackson Kemper, from which he organized the frontier Episcopal Church from Indiana to Minnesota to Kansas.
15	Sen. William Blair House	Sen. William Blair House	October 28, 1983 (#83004327)	434 Madison Street; 43°00′50″N 88°14′12″W	Waukesha	Fine 2-story Italianate-styled house built in 1877 for State Senator William Blair .
16	Block C Historic District	Block C Historic District	January 11, 1996 (#95001504)	Roughly bounded by West Main Street, Gaspar Street, and Broadway; 43°00′41″N 88°13′51″W	Waukesha	Five contributing buildings at the Five Points intersection, comprising the 1895 Williams building and four later 20th-Century Commercial-style buildings: the 1914 Andrews building, the 1929 Metropolitan Store building, its 1929 annex, and its 1937 annex (then a garage).
17	J. C. Booth House	J. C. Booth House	January 25, 1973 (#73000094)	About 1 mile SW of Saylesville on Saylesville Road; 42°56′22″N 88°20′20″W	Saylesville	Federal-style limestone cottage built in 1850 by its first owner, John Rankin, a stonemason, and Charles Smith and Alexander McFarlin.
18	Patrick J. Buckley House	Patrick J. Buckley House	February 28, 1991 (#91000075)	1101 Buckley Street; 43°00′51″N 88°13′36″W	Waukesha	2-story Queen Anne-styled house built in 1894 in the subdivision that blacksmith-cum-real-estate developer Buckley himself platted. The original hitching post is still at the curb.
19	Burr Oak Tavern	Burr Oak Tavern	December 28, 1988 (#86003403)	315-317 East Capitol Drive; 43°06′17″N 88°20′33″W	Hartland	2.5-story Greek Revival-styled inn built for Patrick Kelley in 1853 along the Watertown Plank Road. In 1887 the west half was refitted as Dr. H.G.B. Nixon's medical office, and in 1937 expanded to handle emergencies.
20	Thomas Camp Farmhouse	Thomas Camp Farmhouse	September 21, 1988 (#88001670)	W204 N8151 Lannon Road; 43°09′56″N 88°09′49″W	Menomonee Falls	Greek Revival-styled, cut limestone farmhouse built between late 1850s and 60s by English immigrant wheat farmer Camp and his wife Mary. Converted in 1931 to a children's summer camp called Lannon Field Farm.
21	Caples' Park Historic District	Caples' Park Historic District	March 17, 1988 (#88000219)	Roughly bounded by East Newhall Avenue, South Hartwell Avenue, Windsor Drive and Oxford Road, and South East Avenue; 42°59′54″N 88°13′27″W	Waukesha	Neighborhood of curving streets built from 1926 to 1938 on the site of the O.M. Sanger Hickory Stock Farm after it was bought by Dr. Byron Caples and subdivided. Houses include mostly Tudor Revival like the 1928 Estberg house, some Colonial Revival like the 1938 Frame house, a few Georgian Revivals like the 1932 Youmans house, and the 1931 Mediterranean Revival Hein house.
22	Dr. Alfred L. Castleman House	Dr. Alfred L. Castleman House	August 2, 1996 (#96000730)	975 South Waterville Road; 43°01′20″N 88°26′16″W	Summit	Greek Revival-styled house built in 1844 for Castleman, a pioneer physician, attendee of the State Constitutional Convention, Civil War veteran, author, regent of the UW, and charter member of the Medical Society of Wisconsin.
23	Walter S. Chandler House	Walter S. Chandler House	December 27, 1974 (#74000137)	151 West College Avenue; 43°00′10″N 88°13′44″W	Waukesha	2-story house with Queen Anne-style massing, Gothic Revival details, a 4-story tower, and a porte-cochère - designed by E. Townsend Mix and built in 1876. Chandler was a lumber dealer.
24	Chapel of St. Mary the Virgin	Chapel of St. Mary the Virgin	February 23, 1972 (#72000067)	2 miles southwest of Nashotah on Nashotah House Road; 43°04′57″N 88°25′34″W	Nashotah	Graceful Gothic Revival-styled chapel with limestone walls at Nashotah House seminary, designed by Milwaukee architect James Douglas and built from 1859 to 1866.
25	Chicago and Northwestern Railroad Passenger Depot	Chicago and Northwestern Railroad Passenger Depot	February 24, 1995 (#95000142)	319 Williams Street; 43°00′20″N 88°13′57″W	Waukesha	1.5-story Queen Anne-styled cream brick passenger depot built by Samuel Dodd for a predecessor of the C&NW in 1881.
26	George Lawrence Clarke Jr. House	George Lawrence Clarke Jr. House	February 24, 1995 (#95000138)	12810 West Hampton Avenue; 43°06′19″N 88°04′21″W	Butler	The Greek Revival-styled 1.5-story wing was built around 1850, and is the last remaining pioneer farmhouse in Butler.
27	George N. Cobb House	George N. Cobb House	March 2, 1982 (#82000719)	South of Oconomowoc at 1505 North Golden Lake Road; 43°03′03″N 88°31′24″W	Oconomowoc	2-story brick Greek Revival farmhouse built around 1850. A.k.a. Frederick Ahrens house.
28	College Avenue Historic District	College Avenue Historic District	October 28, 1983 (#83004328)	Fountain Street, S. East and College Aves. 43°00′11″N 88°13′42″W	Waukesha	Cluster of historic buildings in and around Carroll College, including the 1887 Richardsonian Romanesque-styled Main Hall, the 1906 Tudor Revival Rankin Hall and Voorhees dormitory, and the 1923 Ganfield gymnasium.
29	Alexander Cook House	Alexander Cook House	October 28, 1983 (#83004329)	600 East North Street; 43°00′55″N 88°14′02″W	Waukesha	Gothic Revival-styled house, with pointed-arch windows, bulls-eye windows, and flared eaves. Built in 1865 for Cook, Waukesha County's first district attorney.
30	Cutler Mound Group	Cutler Mound Group	November 3, 1988 (#88002184)	321 Wisconsin Ave. 43°00′33″N 88°14′00″W	Waukesha	Three conical mounds probably built by Woodland people, remnants of a larger group called Church Street Mounds.
31	Morris Cutler House	Morris Cutler House	October 28, 1983 (#83004330)	401 Central Ave. 43°00′13″N 88°14′03″W	Waukesha	Large, Greek Revival-styled frame house with full pediment, built in 1845 by the founder of Waukesha in what is now Cutler Park. Moved to current location in 1902.
32	Dansk Evangelical Lutheran Kirke	Dansk Evangelical Lutheran Kirke	April 21, 1988 (#86003422)	400 W. Capitol Drive; 43°06′09″N 88°21′10″W	Hartland	Gothic Revival-styled church built in 1910 by the Danish-speaking Lutheran congregation.
33	George H. and Frances Daubner House		May 9, 2022 (#100007680)	16680 West North Ave. 43°03′39″N 88°07′11″W	Brookfield	Brick high-style Italianate farmhouse built in 1866 by English immigrant and Civil War vet George Daubner.
34	Cyrus Davis Farmstead	Cyrus Davis Farmstead	March 15, 1989 (#88001674)	W204 N7776 Lannon Road; 43°09′29″N 88°09′41″W	Menomonee Falls	Greek Revival-styled farmhouse with limestone walls built about 1855 for Davis, a wheat and wool farmer and investor in a local limestone quarry.
35	Cyrus Davis-Davis Brothers Farmhouse	Cyrus Davis-Davis Brothers Farmhouse	September 21, 1988 (#88001672)	W204 N7818 Lannon Road; 43°09′35″N 88°09′45″W	Menomonee Falls	Farmhouse with gabled-ell floor plan and limestone walls, built by Cyrus about 1868 when his son Edgar was married.
36	Delafield Fish Hatchery	Delafield Fish Hatchery	May 13, 1981 (#81000064)	Main Street; 43°03′40″N 88°24′26″W	Delafield	Station where the state produced walleye and bass fry to stock lakes and streams from 1907 to 1950. The 1907 Tudor Revival admin and walleye-tank building remains.
37	Dewey Mound Group	Dewey Mound Group	December 19, 1978 (#78000147)	Address Restricted	Big Bend	Group of effigy and oval mounds created by prehistoric Native Americans. Includes birds and water spirits, with the largest 286 feet long.
38	Dousman Inn	Dousman Inn	January 15, 1979 (#79000118)	1075 Pilgrim Parkway; 43°02′38″N 88°06′27″W	Brookfield	2.5-story stagecoach inn built for Michael Dousman about 1843 along the Watertown Plank Road, in Greek Revival style to project civilization in the wilderness. Moved from 15670 Blue Mound Road in 1981.
39	Downtown Historic District	Downtown Historic District	October 28, 1983 (#83004331)	Roughly bounded by Broadway, Grand Ave., Clinton and South Sts. 43°00′40″N 88°13′55″W	Waukesha	Fairly intact portion of the old downtown, including the 1857 Greek Revival-styled Robinson block which housed a harness shop, the 1858 pre-Civil War Italianate Barnes block, the 1870 Italianate New Exchange Hotel, the 1891 Queen Anne-styled Putney building (pictured), the 1893 Queen Anne Lyle funeral parlor, the 1904 Neoclassical Masonic Temple, and the 1925 Art Deco First State Bank.
40	George Dwinnell House	George Dwinnell House	October 28, 1983 (#83004332)	442 W. College Ave. 43°00′11″N 88°14′10″W	Waukesha	2-story Queen Anne-style house with corner tower, built 1885-1890 by carpenter George Dwinnell for his own use.
41	East Broadway Historic District	East Broadway Historic District	March 7, 1996 (#96000249)	Roughly, Broadway from Fisk Ave. to Morningside Drive; 43°00′16″N 88°12′42″W	Waukesha	Neighborhood developed from Edward Porter's farm, including the 1870 Porter farmhouse, the 1915 Arts and Crafts Harwood house, the 1921 Mediterranean Revival Schuetze house, the 1924 Spanish Colonial Revival Dr. Hodgson house, the 1925 Dutch Colonial Revival Dr. Werra house, the 1926 Scheel bungalow, the 1928 Tudor Revival Meier house, the 1931 American Foursquare Beaumont House, and the 1937 Tudor Revival Christoph house.
42	East Capitol Drive Historic District	East Capitol Drive Historic District	September 11, 1986 (#86002319)	337-702 E. Capitol Drive; 43°06′18″N 88°20′17″W	Hartland	Neighborhood along what was the Watertown Plank Road, including the 1854 Dr. Benjamin house, the 1883 gabled ell Frisbie house, the 1895 Queen Anne-styled Crozier house, the 1905 Dutch Colonial Revival Pynn house, the 1916 Wills bungalow, the 1926 Spanish Colonial Revival Wittenburg house, and the 1933 Tudor Revival Feix house.
43	Dr. F. C. Elliot House	Dr. F. C. Elliot House	October 28, 1983 (#83004333)	501Dunbar Ave. 43°00′20″N 88°14′13″W	Waukesha	2-story Queen Anne-styled house built in 1891, with the tower and fieldstone porch added about 1900. F.C. was a local dentist.
44	Joseph Fabacker House	Joseph Fabacker House	February 24, 1995 (#95000139)	341 NW. Barstow Street; 43°01′00″N 88°14′02″W	Waukesha	Highly intact 2-story Queen Anne house built in 1894, with bargeboards and porches topped with metal cresting. Fabacker had the house built, but the Thomas Edwards family lived there almost 60 years.
45	First Baptist Church	First Baptist Church	October 28, 1983 (#83004334)	247 Wisconsin Ave. 43°00′34″N 88°13′52″W	Waukesha	Gothic Revival-styled church with soaring diagonally-set corner tower, designed by E. Townsend Mix and built in 1872.
46	First Congregational Church	First Congregational Church	December 8, 1986 (#86003405)	214 E. Capitol Drive; 43°06′18″N 88°20′36″W	Hartland	Gothic Revival-styled Congregational church designed by William J. Redden and built in 1923.
47	First Congregational Church	First Congregational Church	January 30, 1992 (#91001991)	100 E. Broadway; 43°00′24″N 88°13′17″W	Waukesha	Congregational church built in 1867 and expanded and restyled since. In the 1840s this congregation was a leader in the anti-slavery movement.
48	First German Reformed Church	First German Reformed Church	September 13, 1991 (#91001390)	413 Wisconsin Ave. 43°00′34″N 88°14′06″W	Waukesha	Victorian Eclectic-styled church built by German-speaking Reformed congregation in 1891. Burned in 2005.
49	First Methodist Church	First Methodist Church	December 1, 1983 (#83004335)	121 Wisconsin Ave. 43°00′34″N 88°12′56″W	Waukesha	Methodist church designed by Henry F. Starbuck in Richardsonian Romanesque style and built in 1895, with a large corner bell tower.
50	Andrew Frame House	Andrew Frame House	October 28, 1983 (#83004337)	507 N. Grand Ave. 43°00′29″N 88°13′52″W	Waukesha	2-story cream brick Italianate home designed by E. Townsend Mix and built in 1879, with original parquet floors and marble fireplaces intact. Frame was a leading banker.
51	Freewill Baptist Church	Freewill Baptist Church	June 22, 1998 (#97001409)	19750 W. National Ave. 42°56′40″N 88°09′37″W	New Berlin	Once-rural Greek Revival-styled church built in 1859 by the first Freewill Baptist congregation in the state.
52	Genesee Town Hall	Genesee Town Hall	June 25, 1981 (#81000065)	Genesee Street; 42°58′01″N 88°22′23″W	Genesee Depot	Frame building with jerkinhead gable-ends, built in 1912 as an "amusement hall," which hosted dances, receptions, political meetings, rollerskating, theater performances, graduations for rural schools, VFW meetings, polling, and town meetings.
53	Genesee Woolen Mill Site		July 10, 2017 (#100000521)	W308 S4484 and W308 S4473 WI 83; 42°57′49″N 88°21′45″W	Genesee	Remains of mill complex begun by Benjamin Jenkins about 1848, and later operated by James Proctor. Includes mill ruins, dam, mill race, Proctor's 1876 house, and a wool-carding shed.
54	Goodwin-McBean Site (47 WK 184)		September 17, 1982 (#82000721)	Address Restricted	Big Bend	Group of conical mounds, with a former camp and workshop nearby.
55	Perry Grace House	Perry Grace House	October 28, 1983 (#83004339)	307 N. West Ave. 43°00′23″N 88°14′11″W	Waukesha	Queen Anne-styled house with 3-story square tower and some Stick style decoration, probably built in the 1880s.
56	Grand View Health Resort	Grand View Health Resort	January 31, 1984 (#84003805)	500 Riverview Ave. 43°01′17″N 88°13′59″W	Waukesha	Neoclassical-styled resort built about 1911, late in Waukesha's "curative springs" era. Claiming its mud had therapeutic powers, this resort grew from 30 guestrooms to 200. A.k.a. "Moor Mud Baths". Demolished in 2023.
57	Gredler-Gramins House	Gredler-Gramins House	November 24, 1980 (#80000203)	20190 Davidson Road; 42°59′20″N 88°09′47″W	Brookfield	Benjamin Carpenter built the initial fieldstone house in 1839. In 1850 John Gredler expanded that building with a 2-story brick Greek Revival-styled front, producing a saltbox form. Gustav Gramins' family farmed there from 1900 to 1955.
58	Hadfield Company Lime Kilns	Hadfield Company Lime Kilns	March 12, 1982 (#82000722)	N of Waukesha; 43°02′19″N 88°12′53″W	Waukesha	Kilns built around 1873 in which limestone was converted to quicklime.
59	Hartland Railroad Depot	Hartland Railroad Depot	April 21, 1988 (#86003417)	301 Pawling Ave. 43°06′01″N 88°20′57″W	Hartland	Brick Italianate-styled depot with bullseye windows in the gable ends, built in 1879 by the Chicago, Milwaukee and St. Paul Railroad.
60	Haseltine Cobblestone House	Haseltine Cobblestone House	January 15, 1980 (#80000204)	North of Big Bend on Big Bend Drive; 42°53′38″N 88°12′34″W	Big Bend	Cobblestone-clad Greek Revival-styled home built in 1842 for an early settler.
61	Hawks Inn	Hawks Inn	February 23, 1972 (#72000068)	428 Wells Street; 43°03′35″N 88°24′25″W	Delafield	2.5-story Greek Revival-styled stagecoach inn built in 1846 by Nelson Paige Hawks on the plank road between Milwaukee and Madison. Later a stop on the Underground Railroad.
62	David J. Hemlock House	David J. Hemlock House	December 1, 1983 (#83004340)	234 Carroll Street; 43°00′29″N 88°13′51″W	Waukesha	2.5-story cream brick Gothic Revival house with corner tower built in 1886. Hemlock was a prominent lawyer.
63	LeRoy A. Henze House	LeRoy A. Henze House	September 21, 1988 (#88001638)	N89 W15781 Main Street; 43°10′43″N 88°06′23″W	Menomonee Falls	Mediterranean Revival-styled house designed by Hugo Logemann and built in 1924 for Henze, then a clerk at the Citizen's State Bank.
64	Ahira R. Hinkley House	Ahira R. Hinkley House	January 21, 1974 (#74000138)	NE of Eagle off WI 59; 42°54′04″N 88°27′08″W	Eagle	Greek Revival-styled house with walls clad in carefully-chosen cobblestone, built in 1848 by a founder of Eagle.
65	Herbert Hoeltz House	Herbert Hoeltz House	September 21, 1988 (#88001636)	N87 W15714 Kenwood Blvd. 43°10′39″N 88°06′19″W	Menomonee Falls	French eclectic-styled house with walls clad in lannon stone and a slate roof, designed by Matthew Berres and built in 1932 for Hoeltz, a retired farmer who owned the Libby-McNeal Canning Company.
66	Elizabeth Hoos House	Elizabeth Hoos House	September 21, 1988 (#88001640)	W164 N9010 Water Street; 43°10′54″N 88°06′47″W	Menomonee Falls	2-story Queen Anne-styled house with a different shingle pattern in each gable, built by Elizabeth's carpenter son Joel.
67	Hoos-Rowell House	Hoos-Rowell House	September 21, 1988 (#88001644)	W164 N8953 Water Street; 43°10′50″N 88°06′49″W	Menomonee Falls	Greek Revival-styled house begun in the 1850s. Henry and Elizabeth Hoos were early owners, if not the first. In 1883 it was bought by George Rowell, grandson of a founder of I.B. Rowell Company, which built agricultural implements.
68	Harold Hornburg House	Harold Hornburg House	December 8, 1986 (#86003431)	213 Warren Ave. 43°06′12″N 88°20′38″W	Hartland	1928 home designed by Eschweiler & Eschweiler in an English cottage style, with rolled eaves that suggest a thatched roof.
69	Jackson House	Jackson House	December 8, 1986 (#86003409)	235 North Ave. 43°06′27″N 88°20′47″W	Hartland	Tudor Revival-styled house built in 1935-36, with peaked gable ends and a bay window with diamond-shaped panes.
70	Samuel D. James House	Samuel D. James House	October 24, 1996 (#83004687)	726 N. East Ave. 43°00′38″N 88°13′38″W	Waukesha	2-story frame Italianate-styled house built in 1871, with incised detailing in the porch and the window hoods. Samuel was a dry goods merchant and a founder of the National Exchange Bank.
71	William Johnston Lime Kiln		March 12, 1982 (#82000723)	E of Genesse Depot; 42°57′58″N 88°19′17″W	Saylesville	Ruins of a structure for cooking limestone, built in 1870.
72	Robert O. Jones House	Robert O. Jones House	October 28, 1983 (#83004342)	501 W. College Ave. 43°00′09″N 88°14′13″W	Waukesha	2-story Queen Anne house built in 1897 for postal clerk Jones.
73	Michael Kelliher House	Michael Kelliher House	October 28, 1983 (#83004341)	407 N. Grand Ave. 43°00′24″N 88°13′53″W	Waukesha	High Victorian Gothic house built in 1874, with cream brick walls, tall narrow windows and gables, and wooden decoration in the gable ends. Formerly listed as John Howitt House.
74	Frank Koehler House and Office	Frank Koehler House and Office	September 21, 1988 (#88001669)	N88 W16623 Appleton Ave. 43°10′40″N 88°06′58″W	Menomonee Falls	2-story building of cream city brick, built in 1893 for Koehler, a wagon-maker who transitioned to implement dealer.
75	Koepsel House	Koepsel House	October 25, 1973 (#73000095)	Old World Wisconsin, off WI 59; 42°51′59″N 88°29′51″W	Eagle	2.5-story half-timbered farmhouse built about 1860 by a German immigrant - now moved to Old World Wisconsin.
76	Laflin Avenue Historic District	Laflin Avenue Historic District	October 28, 1983 (#83004343)	W. Laflin and Garfield Aves. 43°00′03″N 88°13′46″W	Waukesha	Small neighborhood along Laflin Avenue, including the 1886 simple Queen Anne-styled Sinsel house (a remnant of the Fountain Spring House resort-hotel), the 1897 Queen Anne Trainor house, the 1904 Picturesque Queen Anne Patterson house, the 1895 Wadsworth-Weeks house which was restyled Neoclassical in 1906, the American Foursquare-style house at 139 W Laflin, the 1926 Colonial Revival Junemann house, and the 1954 Prairie/Contemporary-style Field house.
77	Lain-Estburg House	Lain-Estburg House	December 27, 1974 (#74000139)	229 Wisconsin Ave. 43°00′35″N 88°13′48″W	Waukesha	Greek Revival-styled house with large pedimented portico, built 1842. The first owner was Isaac Lain, carpenter, businessman and civic leader; later Edward Estberg, banker and mayor of Waukesha; more recently an American Legion post.
78	Garwin A. Mace House		September 21, 1988 (#88001650)	W166 N8941 Grand Ave. 43°10′49″N 88°06′59″W	Menomonee Falls	2.5-story house with Gothic Revival massing, decorated bargeboards, and Queen Anne-style shingles in the gable ends, built in 1891 for the owner of the Marble Gloss Lime Company, who was also the first village president and a leader of the Farm's and Merchant's Bank.
79	Garwin Mace Lime Kilns	Garwin Mace Lime Kilns	March 12, 1982 (#82000724)	LimeKiln Park; 43°10′38″N 88°06′47″W	Menomonee Falls	3 25-foot-tall kilns with vertical cylindrical shafts built in 1890 by Mace. Nearby are the ruins of three kilns built by Frederick Nehs in 1845.
80	Madison Street Historic District	Madison Street Historic District	March 22, 1990 (#90000489)	Jct. of Madison, Randall, and Third Sts. 43°00′50″N 88°14′13″W	Waukesha	Cluster of historic houses northwest of Waukesha's downtown, including the 1876 Italianate-styled Blair house, the Queen Anne-styled Enos Deck and Goerke houses built in the 1880s, the 1891 Park View Park, and the 1923 Craftsman-influenced Whitte duplex.
81	Main Street Historic District	Main Street Historic District	September 21, 1988 (#88001629)	Main and Appleton Sts. 43°10′46″N 88°06′47″W	Menomonee Falls	Cluster of old stores and factories, including the Coates and Ostrander store built in the late 1860s, the 1891 Enterprise Roller Mill, and the 1891 Fraser building, at left in photo.
82	William G. Mann House	William G. Mann House	October 28, 1983 (#83004349)	346 Maple Ave. 43°00′25″N 88°14′04″W	Waukesha	Queen Anne-styled house with bulbous corner tower designed by C.C. Anderson and built in 1897 for photographer Mann. Has housed the Waukesha Women's Club since 1927.
83	McCall Street Historic District	McCall Street Historic District	December 1, 1983 (#83004348)	McCall and James Sts., and N. East and Hartwell Aves.; also roughly Charles and James Sts. from College Ave. to McCall Street and Hartwell Ave. from College to Grove Street; 43°00′19″N 88°13′26″W	Waukesha	Historic neighborhood which includes the c. 1860 Greek Revival-styled Bowron/Randles house, the 1857/1890 home of Governor Alexander Randall, the 1897 Colonial Revival-styled Perkins house, the 1901 Queen Anne Ovitt house, and the 1926 Georgian Revival Randle house, among others.
84	John and Florence Melster House		May 10, 2023 (#100009002)	316 Oxford Rd. 42°59′51″N 88°13′26″W	Waukesha	Contemporary/Wrightian-style house built into a wooded hillside, designed by John Randal McDonald and built in 1955 for Melster, a leader of Dairyland Food Laboratories.
85	Menomonee Falls City Hall	Menomonee Falls City Hall	September 21, 1988 (#88001667)	N88 W16631 Appleton Ave. 43°10′40″N 88°07′00″W	Menomonee Falls	2-story Mediterranean Revival-styled civic building, with curved parapets and octagonal bell tower, designed by Hugo Haeuser and built in 1929 to house the city hall, fire station, and library.
86	Menomonee Golf Club	Menomonee Golf Club	September 21, 1988 (#88001663)	N73 W13430 Appleton Ave. 43°09′03″N 88°04′36″W	Menomonee Falls	Sprawling Tudor Revival-styled clubhouse designed by Robert Bierman to resemble an English manor house and built in 1930.
87	Charles Merten House	Charles Merten House	March 17, 1995 (#95000248)	929 Rosemary Street; 43°00′48″N 88°13′08″W	Waukesha	Highly intact Queen Anne-style house built in 1890, probably based on plan #190 in (Robert) Shoppell's Modern Houses. Charles Merten, a printer, bought the house in 1907 and his family lived there for 80 years.
88	Miller-Davidson House	Miller-Davidson House	April 24, 1973 (#73000096)	On County Line Road, East of U.S. 41; 43°11′26″N 88°06′19″W	Menomonee Falls	Greek Revival-styled house with limestone walls built about 1858 for farmer John Fehl, with the basement constructed in an unusual way. Later owned by Milwaukee businessman Charles Miller and Mrs. Walter Davidson, widow of a Harley-Davidson president.
89	Dr. Volney L. Moore House	Dr. Volney L. Moore House	October 28, 1983 (#83004350)	307 E. Main Street; 43°00′48″N 88°13′28″W	Waukesha	Cream brick Italian Villa-styled house with 3-story tower, built about 1877. Dr. Volney was a homeopathic physician in Waukesha from 1866 to 1886.
90	Moreland Boulevard Pump House and Reservoir	Moreland Boulevard Pump House and Reservoir	July 5, 1996 (#96000726)	413 Moreland Blvd. 43°00′32″N 88°15′00″W	Waukesha	Small stucco-clad reinforced concrete structure designed by Martin F. White in Art Deco style to somewhat blend in to its residential neighborhood. Built in 1931 by Charles S. Reid for the Waukesha Water Dept.
91	Morey-Andrews House	Morey-Andrews House	April 14, 1995 (#95000405)	704 Westowne Ave. 43°01′23″N 88°15′26″W	Waukesha	Very intact Craftsman-influenced bungalow built in 1931 by Paul Miller for developer Ted Morey. The building is clad in coursed cobblestone, with a wide front porch beneath a sunburst design and jerkinhead gables. A.A. Andrews and his wife bought the house in 1933.
92	Morey-Lewis House	Morey-Lewis House	April 14, 1995 (#95000402)	1312 Pleasant View Ave. 43°01′41″N 88°15′30″W	Waukesha	Another very intact cobblestone-clad Craftsman bungalow built by Paul Miller in Ted Morey's subdivision. This one was built in 1927. The front door is flanked by sidelights and sheltered beneath a gable-roofed porch. Even the flower boxes are clad in cobblestone. Mr. and Mrs. Charles Lewis bought the house in 1949.
93	Morey-Seidens House	Morey-Seidens House	April 14, 1995 (#95000404)	2020 Easy Street; 43°01′41″N 88°15′34″W	Waukesha	Another intact cobblestone-clad Craftsman-influenced bungalow built by Paul Miller in Ted Morey's subdivision. This one was built in 1929 and has larger cobbles than the other two. Raymond and Beulah Seidens bought the house in 1932.
94	Theodore I. and Margaret Morey House		April 3, 2024 (#100010153)	1516 Pleasant View Avenue; 43°01′47″N 88°15′30″W	Waukesha	Home of Ted Morey, who developed the surrounding subdivision of Westowne - one of the first suburbs of Waukesha. The house was built in 1928, originally a Tudor Revival-style cottage. Morey expanded it around 1939 to the current two-story Southern Colonial-style home.
95	Muskego State Graded School		October 17, 2019 (#100004527)	S75 W17476 Janesville Rd. 42°54′27″N 88°07′56″W	Muskego	The original 2-room school was built in 1926 - red-brick with a hip roof designed by William J. Redden. Expansions were added to the back in 1949, 1951, 1952 and 1956 as population grew. Finally served as an elementary school until it closed in 2017.
96	Nashotah House Theological Seminary	Nashotah House Theological Seminary	January 12, 2017 (#100000523)	2777 Mission Road; 43°04′51″N 88°25′23″W	Delafield	Episcopal seminary founded in 1842, with historic buildings including the 1843 Greek Revival-styled Red Chapel, and the 1862 Chapel of St. Mary the Virgin, the 1869 Shelton Hall (pictured), and the 1892 Sabine Hall - all different strains of Gothic Revival style.
97	National Guard Armory 127th Regiment Infantry Company G	National Guard Armory 127th Regiment Infantry Company G	December 6, 1984 (#84000709)	103 E. Jefferson at Main Street; 43°06′17″N 88°30′02″W	Oconomowoc	Built in 1921, this was the first armory built after Wisconsin passed its Armory Aid Act. Designed by Henry Hengels, its style is Spanish Mission, with stucco walls and red tile roof. It also served as a social center for athletic matches, dances, shows, etc.
98	National Hotel	National Hotel	October 28, 1983 (#83004344)	235 W. Main Street; 43°00′42″N 88°13′48″W	Waukesha	3-story Italianate-styled hotel with walls of rock-faced limestone and a broad cornice, built on a corner by John Sperber in 1871, during Waukesha's springs era.
99	Enoch Gardner and Mary Caroline Koch Needham House	Enoch Gardner and Mary Caroline Koch Needham House	June 15, 2000 (#00000700)	12713 W. Greenfield Ave. 43°00′59″N 88°04′20″W	New Berlin	2-story Italianate-styled house with hip roof and cupola. The walls are two feet thick, built with fieldstone that Enoch picked on his surrounding farm. He had two masons split the stone in the winter of 1867/68 and built the house in 1868.
100	Charles E. Nelson Sr. House	Charles E. Nelson Sr. House	April 5, 1990 (#90000560)	520 N. Grand Ave. 43°00′31″N 88°13′54″W	Waukesha	Large, intact Tudor Revival-styled house built about 1909 for the family of businessman Nelson. Exterior is limestone and stucco. Inside is a large living room with oak beams and a large stone fireplace.
101	Newhall Avenue Pump House and Reservoir	Newhall Avenue Pump House and Reservoir	July 15, 1999 (#99000849)	445 W. Newhall Ave. 42°59′58″N 88°14′09″W	Waukesha	Modest pumping station of the city water department designed by Martin White in Art Deco style and built by Klug and Smith in 1948. Structure is reinforced concrete clad in stucco, with fluted piers.
102	William A. Nickell House	William A. Nickell House	October 28, 1983 (#83004346)	511 Lake Street; 43°00′33″N 88°13′12″W	Waukesha	2.5-story late Queen Anne-styled house with lattice design in the gable peaks, a striking chimney, and a carriage house behind. Nickell was a farmer who and served as county treasurer and sheriff, and moved into town in 1892, when he built the house.
103	Northwestern Hotel	Northwestern Hotel	March 17, 1995 (#95000249)	322 Williams Street; 43°00′21″N 88°13′56″W	Waukesha	2-story brick building with a Queen Anne-style facade, built about 1893 by Valentine Imig as a hotel and saloon across from the C&NW depot.
104	Oconomowoc City Hall	Oconomowoc City Hall	April 10, 1980 (#80000205)	174 E. Wisconsin Ave. 43°06′38″N 88°29′49″W	Oconomowoc	Cream brick municipal building with square clock tower, designed by George Ferry in Romanesque Revival style and built in 1886. It housed city offices, police and fire departments, municipal court, and social events.
105	Oconomowoc Depot	Oconomowoc Depot	January 29, 1980 (#80000206)	115 Collins Street; 43°06′34″N 88°29′54″W	Oconomowoc	1-story hip-roofed depot clad in split granite, designed by Charles Sumner Frost and built by the Chicago, Milwaukee, St. Paul and Pacific Railroad in 1896.
106	Oconomowoc High School	Oconomowoc High School	August 6, 2013 (#13000588)	623 Summit Ave. 43°06′15″N 88°29′25″W	Oconomowoc	Former high school, with the 1923 section designed in Collegiate Gothic style by Parkinson & Dockendorff, the 1938 auditorium designed in Art Deco style by Eschweiler & Eschweiler, and the 1950s additions designed by Ebling, Plunkett & Keymar. Replaced by the current Oconomowoc High School in 1965.
107	Okauchee House	Okauchee House	August 11, 1978 (#78000149)	34880 Lake Drive; 43°06′44″N 88°26′21″W	Okauchee	2.5-story stagecoach inn built by Israel McConnell in 1850-51 along the Milwaukee–Watertown Plank Road. The walls are 8-inch oak planks laid horizontal on top of each other, perhaps the only remaining example of this technique in the state.
108	Old Waukesha County Courthouse	Old Waukesha County Courthouse	March 27, 1975 (#75000082)	101 W. Main Street; 43°00′45″N 88°13′37″W	Waukesha	Municipal building with corner turrets and a large square tower in Richardsonian Romanesque style, with sections built in 1885, 1893, and 1938.
109	Owen and Margaret Oliver House	Owen and Margaret Oliver House	January 31, 2011 (#10001182)	W 314 S 3986 Wisconsin Highway 83; 42°58′20″N 88°22′26″W	Genesee	Frame Italianate-styled farmhouse built c. 1880 and owned by Welsh immigrants the Olivers. Farm also includes a square stone silo, a frame horse barn, and a fieldstone shed.
110	Gustave Pabst Estate	Gustave Pabst Estate	November 27, 1989 (#89002033)	36100 Genesee Lake Road; 43°03′06″N 88°27′56″W	Summit	Country estate of the son of Frederick Pabst built around 1928, with an Italian Renaissance revival mansion designed by Richard Philipp with solarium, smoking room, servants' quarters, and butler's pantry. Later St. Monica's Augustinian monastery.
111	Pearl and Grand Avenue Historic District	Pearl and Grand Avenue Historic District	September 15, 2004 (#04001004)	Pearl Ave. bounded by Grand Ave. and Franklin Street and portions of Pleasant and Division Sts. 42°51′57″N 88°19′53″W	Mukwonago	Residential historic district with 22 contributing properties built from 1892 to 1954, including the 1892 Queen Anne Asa Craig house (pictured), the 1926 Spanish Colonial St. James Catholic Church, and a small replica of a tower from the Irish Blarney Castle, built as a garden folly in 1897.
112	Clarence Peck Residence	Clarence Peck Residence	January 28, 1988 (#87002569)	430 and 434 North Lake Road; 43°06′57″N 88°30′00″W	Oconomowoc	Greek Revival-styled home started around 1846 for Hosea Townsend, Oconomowoc's first physician. Bought in 1872 by the Pecks from Chicago, who expanded it, adding the columns.
113	Walter L. Peck House	Walter L. Peck House	April 10, 1986 (#86000715)	38928 Islandale Drive; 43°07′21″N 88°30′48″W	Oconomowoc	Fine 2.5-story Stick style house on an island in Lac La Belle, designed by Cass Chapman with bay windows, flared eaves, and a widow's walk. Peck's father probably made most of his money in early Chicago real estate.
114	Peterson Site (47 WK 199)		September 2, 1982 (#82000726)	Address Restricted	Big Bend	
115	Pokrandt Blacksmith Shop	Pokrandt Blacksmith Shop	October 28, 1983 (#83004351)	128 East St. Paul Ave. 43°00′48″N 88°14′02″W	Waukesha	Finest remaining blacksmith shop in Waukesha, built in 1892 by Gustave Pokrandt to service horses and buggies. By the 1920s it was transitioning to service autos.
116	Hannah Pratt House	Hannah Pratt House	October 28, 1983 (#83004352)	501 Barney Street; 43°00′30″N 88°13′29″W	Waukesha	Wooden Gothic Revival-styled house with shaped window heads and elaborate cross-pieces in the gable peaks, built between 1874 and 1880.
117	John A. Pratt House	John A. Pratt House	September 21, 1988 (#88001634)	N88 W15634 Park Blvd. 43°10′43″N 88°06′15″W	Menomonee Falls	Neoclassical house with colossal portico, Doric columns, and Palladian windows, built in 1903 for Pratt, a banker, businessman, and developer.
118	Putney Block	Putney Block	September 23, 1982 (#82000727)	301 W. Main Street, 816 and 802 Grand Ave. 43°00′40″N 88°13′54″W	Waukesha	Three sections: the 1870 3-story Italianate-styled Orient Building, the 1882 Putney Block, and the 1891 2-story Queen Anne-styled New Putney Block. Over the years, occupants included a jeweler, a drug store, a confectionery, a department store, dry goods stores, a grocery, dentists, insurance agents, lawyers, a physician, an orchestra, the IOOF, Masons, and Elks.
119	Frank H. Putney House	Frank H. Putney House	October 28, 1983 (#83004353)	223 Wisconsin Ave. 43°00′34″N 88°13′47″W	Waukesha	Large "English style" (early Tudor Revival) house with half-timbering and porte cochere, built in 1901 for Frank, a Civil War vet, lawyer, expander of the Putney Block, executive in a bank, a gas company, and a light company, and assistant Secretary of State of Wisconsin.
120	Reformed Presbyterian Church of Vernon	Reformed Presbyterian Church of Vernon	January 7, 1999 (#98001595)	W234 S7710 Big Bend Road; 42°54′55″N 88°13′07″W	Vernon	Greek Revival-styled church built in 1853 by its Reformed Presbyterian congregation.
121	Resthaven Hotel	Resthaven Hotel	October 28, 1983 (#83004354)	915 N. Hartwell Ave. 43°00′48″N 88°13′13″W	Waukesha	Large resort hotel designed by Armand Koch in Neoclassical style and built by John H. Foster & Sons in 1905, at the end of Waukesha's Springs Era, financed by Frederick Pabst and Charles Pfister among others. It aimed to be a place where overworked businessmen restored their health, but lasted only ten years, then serving as a V.A. hospital, then a TB hospital.
122	St. John Chrysostom Church	St. John Chrysostom Church	February 23, 1972 (#72000069)	1111 Genesee Street; 43°03′49″N 88°24′19″W	Delafield	1851 Carpenter Gothic-style Episcopal church with elaborate bargeboards, probably based on a design by Richard Upjohn.
123	St. John's Military Academy	St. John's Military Academy	October 28, 1977 (#77000059)	1101 N. Genesee St. 43°03′49″N 88°24′24″W	Delafield	Collection of historic campus buildings, including the 1857 rectory, the unique Shingle style Memorial Hall built in 1893, and the castle-like halls designed by Thomas Van Alyea from 1906 to 1930.
124	St. Joseph's Catholic Church Complex	St. Joseph's Catholic Church Complex	October 28, 1983 (#83004355)	818 North East Avenue; 43°00′27″N 88°13′37″W	Waukesha	High Victorian Gothic church designed by Adolphus Druiding and built in 1888. Also a Greek Revival house built around 1878, which was used as a convent.
125	St. Mary's Catholic Church Complex		November 3, 2022 (#100008332)	225 South Hartwell Ave. and 520 East Newhall Ave. 42°59′59″N 88°13′18″W	Waukesha	Includes the 1953 school with a convent for Franciscan Sisters on the top floor designed by Flad and Assoc, the 1960 school addition and rectory also designed by Flad, and the 1964 Contemporary-style church building designed by Wenzel, Zoller and Gunn and clad in lannon stone and mosaic glass designed by Conrad Pickel.
126	St. Matthias Episcopal Church	St. Matthias Episcopal Church	October 28, 1983 (#83004356)	111 E. Main Street; 43°00′46″N 88°13′36″W	Waukesha	Gothic Revival Episcopal church with a large corner tower, begun in 1851. The oldest church building in Waukesha that survives basically intact.
127	Casper M. Sanger House	Casper M. Sanger House	October 28, 1983 (#83004357)	507 E. College Ave. 43°00′10″N 88°13′18″W	Waukesha	2.5-story cream brick Queen Anne-styled house built in 1886. Sanger was a tanner, farmer, and sheriff who built the house as part of his Hickory Park Stock Farm. Starting in 1898 it housed Dr. Bryon Caples' Waukesha Springs Sanitarium for nervous disorders, and later a convent. Demolished in 2018.
128	Saylesville Historic District	Saylesville Historic District	April 11, 2003 (#03000225)	Saylesville Road from Genesee Creek to Point Drive; 42°56′55″N 88°19′17″W	Genesee	Historic structures at a rural crossroads that grew around a mill, including the 1841/1928 Saylesville dam, the 1849 William Brown Blacksmith shop, the 1871 Saylesville Mill, the 1876 Allen house, the 1890 Community Hall, and the 1918 WWI memorial.
129	Carl and Therese Schauwitzer House	Carl and Therese Schauwitzer House	September 18, 2013 (#13000751)	S84 W17698 Woods Road; 42°53′27″N 88°08′09″W	Muskego	Frame farmhouse with Italianate-style details, built in 1859 by German immigrants, with some remaining farm buildings, in an area where little is left of farming.
130	Henry and Mary Schuttler House	Henry and Mary Schuttler House	July 16, 1987 (#87001122)	371 East Lisbon Road; 43°07′16″N 88°29′41″W	Oconomowoc	Brick mansion designed by Charles Gombert with Victorian Gothic-styled exterior and a Renaissance Revival interior and built in 1879. Henry, a son of a wealthy Chicago wagon maker, vacationed, farmed, and entertained in this house.
131	Sign of the Willows	Sign of the Willows	December 8, 1986 (#86003428)	122 E. Capitol Drive; 43°06′17″N 88°20′47″W	Hartland	Tudor Revival-styled restaurant with cobblestone-clad first story and half-timbered 2nd, built in 1923 by the Weinkaufs. Now the Palmer Steakhouse.
132	Silurian Mineral Springhouse	Silurian Mineral Springhouse	January 31, 1984 (#84003814)	Post Office Circle; 43°00′35″N 88°13′23″W	Waukesha	Neoclassical-styled well-house with mosaic panels showing spring-related motifs. Built in 1927, at the end of Waukesha's springs era.
133	William P. Sloan House	William P. Sloan House	October 28, 1983 (#83004368)	912 N. Barstow Street; 43°00′45″N 88°13′45″W	Waukesha	1841. First stone house in Waukesha, with walls of coursed cut limestone from Lyman Goodnow's quarry, the first quarry in Waukesha. Sloan was an attorney, first treasurer of Waukesha county, and partner of Alexander Randall.
134	Camillia Smith House	Camillia Smith House	October 28, 1983 (#83004358)	603 N. West Ave. 43°00′32″N 88°14′10″W	Waukesha	Early, archetypal Queen Anne-styled house built in 1883.
135	Statesan Historic District	Statesan Historic District	April 21, 1988 (#88000454)	Boys School Road; 43°01′28″N 88°23′23″W	Wales	First and largest tuberculosis sanitorium sponsored by the state of Wisconsin, opened in 1907. "Statesan" is short for State Sanitorium.
136	Ten Chimneys	Ten Chimneys	February 23, 1998 (#98000076)	S42 W31610 Depot Road; 42°57′51″N 88°22′38″W	Genesee	Summer home and gentleman's farm of Lynn Fontanne and Alfred Lunt, the first family of American theater from the 1920s to 1940s.
137	Third Street Bridge	Third Street Bridge	September 21, 1988 (#88001647)	Roosevelt Drive; 43°10′55″N 88°06′52″W	Menomonee Falls	Stone arch bridge over the Menomonee River, built in 1899 of coursed limestone by mason Nelson Lund. Replaced in 1996.
138	Totten-Butterfield House	Totten-Butterfield House	January 31, 1984 (#84003816)	515 N. Grand Ave. 43°00′29″N 88°13′52″W	Waukesha	Fine Greek Revival-styled house built in 1855 by druggist Henry Totten. Bought in 1880 by Miles Butterfield, painter and Civil War hero.
139	Trapp Filling Station	Trapp Filling Station	December 8, 1986 (#86003419)	252-256 W. Capitol Drive; 43°06′11″N 88°21′03″W	Hartland	House built in 1922 with some Tudor Revival stylings, which Cornelius Trapp adapted into a combination residence and early gas station.
140	Christian Turck House	Christian Turck House	October 25, 1973 (#73000097)	Off WI 59 in Old World Wisconsin; 42°51′56″N 88°29′57″W	Eagle	Cedar log house chinked with rye straw and clay, built in 1846 in Washington County. It is now moved to Old World Wisconsin, and called the Schottler House.
141	United Unitarian and Universalist Church	United Unitarian and Universalist Church	October 1, 1987 (#87001759)	216 Main Street; 42°51′43″N 88°19′55″W	Mukwonago	Large, traditional Gothic Revival church built in 1879 by a Unitarian and Universalist congregation.
142	Sarah Belle Van Buren House	Sarah Belle Van Buren House	December 8, 1986 (#86003426)	128 Hill Street; 43°06′18″N 88°20′54″W	Hartland	Squarish Queen Anne-styled house built between 1891 and 1894 for Sarah, who was a teacher and daughter of Hartland's mill-owner.
143	Village Park Bandstand	Village Park Bandstand	September 21, 1988 (#88001653)	Village Park on Garfield Drive; 43°10′32″N 88°07′07″W	Menomonee Falls	Polygonal pavilion with limestone base, built in 1938 with local labor and Works Progress Administration funds, as a focal point for the village's park.
144	Visitation Convent Complex	Visitation Convent Complex	May 25, 2011 (#11000311)	13105 Watertown Plank Road; 43°02′42″N 88°04′31″W	Elm Grove	Historic buildings of the convent of the School Sisters of Notre Dame, including the cemetery begun in 1853, 1899 German Renaissance Revival-styled Notre Dame Hall, the 1903 St Mary's Orphanage of the same style, the Neoclassical-styled 1921 Maria Hall, and the 1926 Our Lady of Lourdes grotto. Partially demolished. Only Notre Dame Hall and Maria Hall remain and were converted into apartments.
145	Ward District No. 3 Schoolhouse	Ward District No. 3 Schoolhouse	July 7, 1981 (#81000066)	WI 67 and Betts Road in Old World Wisconsin; 42°51′27″N 88°29′37″W	Eagle	2-room schoolhouse built in 1849 by Yankee farmers, with simple Greek Revival style seen in the pitch of the roof, the frieze boards, and the cornice with returns.
146	Stephen Warren House	Stephen Warren House	December 8, 1986 (#86003432)	235 E. Capitol Drive; 43°06′16″N 88°20′36″W	Hartland	2-story cream brick Greek Revival house built in the 1850s for Warren, Hartland's founder.
147	Waukesha Post Office	Waukesha Post Office	October 28, 1983 (#83004359)	235 W. Broadway Ave. 43°00′39″N 88°13′49″W	Waukesha	Neoclassical-styled post office with semicurcular portico and copper-clad dome, designed under Oscar Wenderoth and built in 1913 - the first federally-owned post office in Waukesha.
148	Waukesha Pure Food Company	Waukesha Pure Food Company	October 28, 1983 (#83004360)	550 Elizabeth Street; 43°00′16″N 88°14′19″W	Waukesha	Factory with prominent 7-story tower, built 1913-16 by the maker of Jiffy-Jell, the first fruit-flavored gelatin dessert to be sold nationally. That company closed in 1921 and the building was later used by the Waukesha Mineral Water Company.
149	C. A. Welch House	C. A. Welch House	October 28, 1983 (#83004361)	1616 White Rock Ave. 43°01′27″N 88°13′08″W	Waukesha	Large, restrained late Queen Anne-style house with cylindrical turret built 1888 for Welch, the head of the White Rock Mineral Spring Company. From 1909 to 1913 housed Dr. Albert Hodgson's Still Rock Sanitarium, which specialized in treating diabetes and kidney disease. Later housed employees of White Rock Springs' bottling plant.
150	Deacon West Octagon House	Deacon West Octagon House	May 12, 1975 (#75000083)	370 High Street; 43°05′16″N 88°15′54″W	Pewaukee	Octagon house with 18-inch thick concrete walls, built by blacksmith Deacon West in 1856. Burned around 1873 except for the concrete walls, and rebuilt with Italianate-style details by Col. N.P. Inglehart.
151	Weston's Antique Apple Orchard	Weston's Antique Apple Orchard	September 6, 1996 (#96000989)	19760 W. National Ave. 42°56′38″N 88°09′45″W	New Berlin	Historic diversified apple/dairy farm, with a home orchard of standard-sized apple trees probably started around 1900, including heirloom varieties like the Calville Blanc d'hiver and the Black Gilliflower, a 1906 gambrel-roofed bank dairy barn, a 1910 Craftsman-style house built by George Koeffler, and a small commercial apple orchard started around 1939.
152	Michael Wick Farmhouse and Barn	Michael Wick Farmhouse and Barn	September 21, 1988 (#88001665)	N72 W13449 Good Hope Road; 43°08′53″N 88°04′39″W	Menomonee Falls	Typical, relatively intact 19th century diversified farmstead, including the 1879 cream brick farmhouse with Italianate-style details, the 1889 gable-roofed post-and-beam bank barn, and a 1920 tile silo.
153	Wisconsin Avenue Historic District	Wisconsin Avenue Historic District	October 28, 1983 (#83004362)	Wisconsin; 43°00′35″N 88°13′52″W	Waukesha	Cohesive group of four historic homes, consisting of the 1870 Italianate-styled Putney cottage, the 1883-84 Second Empire-styled Hadfield house, the 1880s Victorian Italianate Street/Waite house, and the 1900 Second Empire Showerman house.
154	Wisconsin Industrial School for Boys	Wisconsin Industrial School for Boys	January 21, 1987 (#86003652)	621 and 627 W. College Ave. 43°00′08″N 88°14′27″W	Waukesha	Two remnants of Wisconsin's first facility for juvenile delinquents, and the first in the western states: the 1911 Lyon Cottage dormitory, and the 1914 Harvey Philip School building. 627 W. College Ave. (Lyon Cottage) demolished in 2016.
155	Louis Yanke Saloon	Louis Yanke Saloon	October 28, 1983 (#83004363)	200 Madison Ave. 43°00′46″N 88°14′04″W	Waukesha	2-story Queen Anne-styled saloon built in 1892 for Yanke, clad in polychromatic granite and limestone, with oriel windows and a corner bartizan.
156	Johann Zimmer Farmhouse	Johann Zimmer Farmhouse	September 21, 1988 (#88001632)	W156 N9390 Pilgrim Road; 43°11′18″N 88°06′10″W	Menomonee Falls	Greek Revival-style house with limestone walls built in 1865 on an unusual arched-stone foundation for Zimmer, a Prussian immigrant wheat farmer.
157	Zion Evangelical Lutheran Church	Zion Evangelical Lutheran Church	December 8, 1986 (#86003423)	403 W. Capitol Drive; 43°06′06″N 88°21′11″W	Hartland	Neogothic Revival-styled church built in 1910 by its German Lutheran congregation.

== Former listings ==
	Name on the Register	Image	Date listed	Date removed	Location	City or town	Description
1	Friederich Farmstead Historic District		September 21, 1988 (#88001631)	February 25, 2004	N96 W15009 County Line Road	Menomonee Falls	Greek Revival-styled house built in 1860 by another Prussian immigrant, with a barn, chicken house, hog barn, corn crib, etc probably built 1892 to 1926.
2	Lincoln High School		September 21, 1988 (#88001662)	October 31, 1989	N88 W16913 Main Street	Menomonee Falls	Brick-clad building designed by Walter M. Tuckwell and built in 1920.
3	Mukwonago High School		October 7, 1994 (#94001211)	May 12, 2009	308 Washington Ave.	Mukwonago	Modernist-styled building designed by Sidney Lovell, built in 1900, and expanded in 1934.
4	Oconomowoc Public Library and Museum		October 24, 1980 (#80000207)	February 17, 1989	212 North Lake Road	Oconomowoc	Tudor Revival-styled store built in 1854.
5	Philadelphia Toboggan Company Carousel Number 15	Philadelphia Toboggan Company Carousel Number 15	June 27, 1979 (#79003771)	May 7, 1984	Janesville Road	Muskego	Delisted when it was relocated to British Columbia for Expo '76. The carousel was relocated to West Nyack, New York in 1997. The Carousel was returned to the Register under a new listing (Ref# 01000583) in 2001.
6	Waukesha County Airport Hangar		January 21, 1999 (#98001596)	February 22, 2002	24151 W. Bluemound Road(Original location. Now located at:); 42°19′32″N 88°50′19″W	Waukesha	Art Deco-styled hangar built in 1936 and moved to Illinois in 2001.

== See also ==
- List of National Historic Landmarks in Wisconsin
- National Register of Historic Places listings in Wisconsin
- Listings in neighboring counties: Dodge, Jefferson, Milwaukee, Ozaukee, Racine, Walworth, Washington
