= McCall (disambiguation) =

McCall is a surname. It may also refer to:

== People ==
- C. W. McCall, stage name of American singer and songwriter William Dale Fries, Jr. (1928-2022)
- McCall Zerboni (born 1986), American women's soccer player

== Places ==
- McCall, Idaho, United States, a resort town
  - McCall Municipal Airport
  - McCall College, a private college
- McCall, Illinois, United States, an unincorporated community
- McCall Glacier, Washington, United States
- McCall Point, Graham Land, Antarctica
- McCall Street, Waukesha, Wisconsin, United States - see McCall Street Historic District

== Other uses ==
- USS McCall (DD-28), a United States Navy destroyer which served in World War I
- USS McCall (DD-400), a United States Navy destroyer which served in World War II
- McCall Corporation, a defunct American publishing company
  - McCall's, an American women's magazine (1897–2001)
- McCall Field, a former name of Calgary International Airport, Calgary, Alberta, Canada
- McCall Elementary School (disambiguation), various schools in the United States

== See also ==
- McCall House (disambiguation), various houses on the United States National Register of Historic Places
