= Arlington Apartments =

Arlington Apartments may refer to:

in Canada

- Arlington Apartments, Edmonton

in the United States

- Arlington Apartments (Waukesha, Wisconsin), listed on the National Register of Historic Places
