= McCalla =

McCalla is a surname. Notable people with the surname include:

- Bowman H. McCalla (1844–1910), officer in the U.S. Navy
- Deidre McCalla, American musician
- Irish McCalla (1928–2002), actress and pinup girl
- LaDouphyous McCalla (born 1976), American football player
- Leyla McCalla (born 1985), American musician
- Noel McCalla (born 1956), current lead singer for Manfred Mann's Earth Band
- Val McCalla (1943–2002), British newspaper publisher
- William McCalla (1814–1849), Irish botanist

== See also ==
- USS McCalla, two ships
- McCalla, Alabama, town in the United States
- McCalla Field, Auxiliary landing airfield, in Guantanamo Bay, Cuba
- McCall (disambiguation)
