= 1871 Wisconsin lieutenant gubernatorial election =

- November 7, 1871
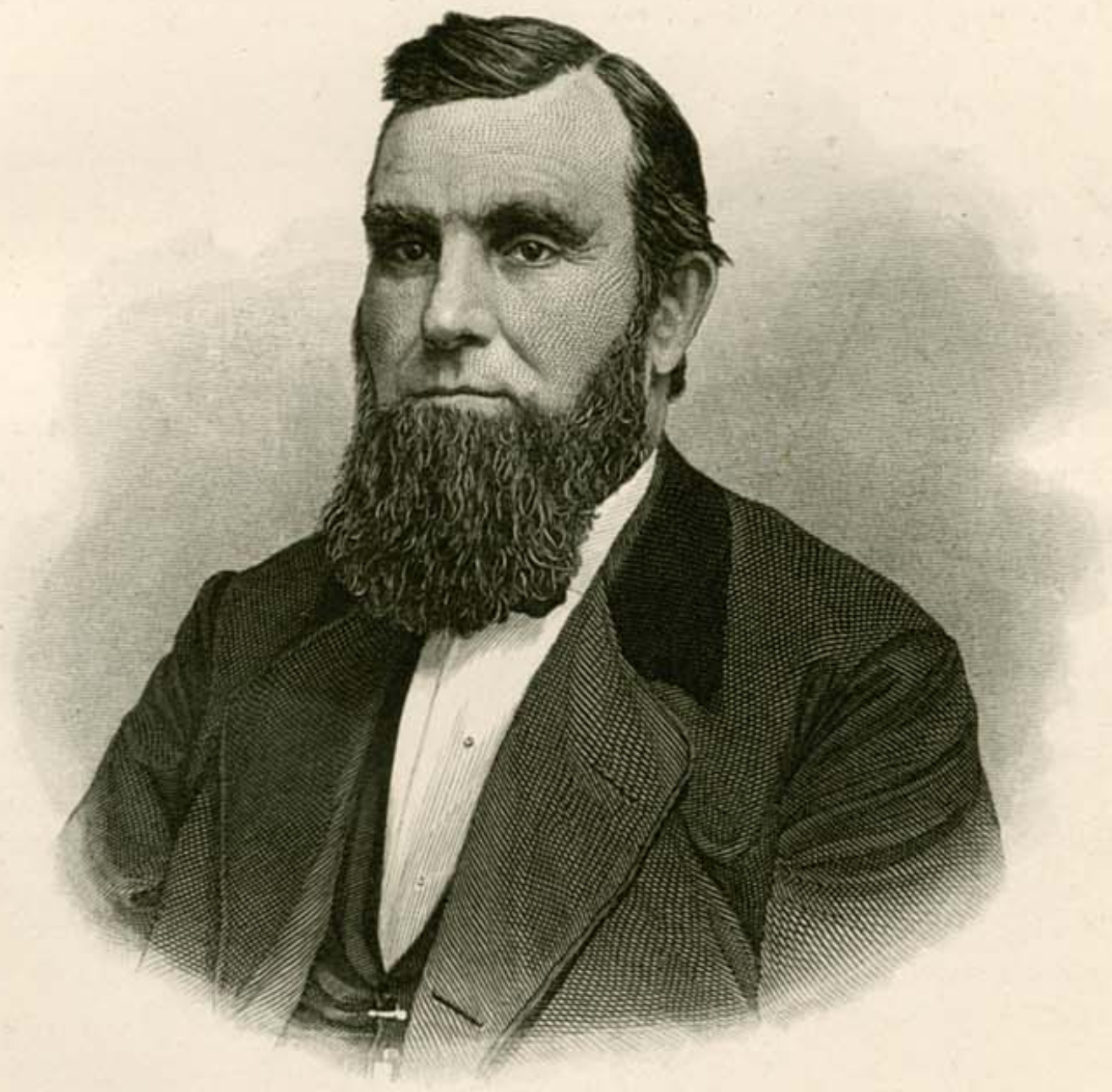

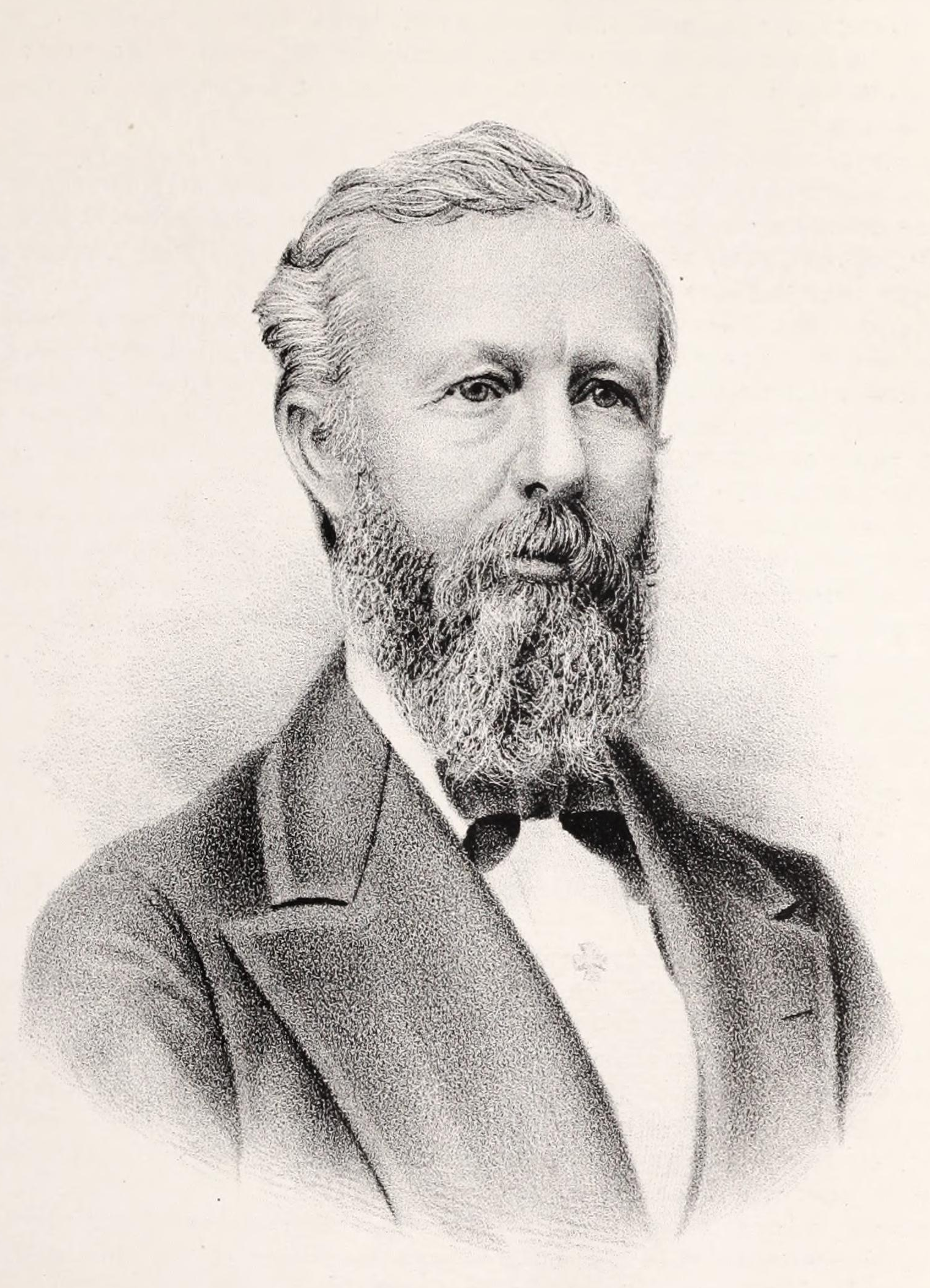
Nominee	Milton Pettit	John A. Rice
Party	Republican	Democratic
Popular vote	77,751	68,807
Percentage	53.03%	46.93%
Lieutenant Governor before election
Thaddeus C. Pound
Republican
Elected Lieutenant Governor
Milton Pettit
Republican

The 1871 Wisconsin lieutenant gubernatorial election was held on November 7, 1871, in order to elect the lieutenant governor of Wisconsin. Republican nominee and incumbent member of the Wisconsin Senate Milton Pettit defeated Democratic nominee and fellow incumbent member of the Wisconsin Senate John A. Rice.

== General election ==
On election day, November 7, 1871, Republican nominee Milton Pettit won the election by a margin of 8,944 votes against his opponent Democratic nominee John A. Rice, thereby retaining Republican control over the office of lieutenant governor. Pettit was sworn in as the 11th lieutenant governor of Wisconsin on January 1, 1872.

=== Results ===
Wisconsin lieutenant gubernatorial election, 1871
Party	Candidate	Votes	%
Republican	Milton Pettit	77,751	53.03
Democratic	John A. Rice	68,807	46.93
	Scattering	61	0.04
Total votes		146,619	100.00
Republican hold			
