= McCall House =

McCall House and variations may refer to:

== United States ==
(by state then city)

- J.M. McCall House, Marshall, Arkansas, listed on the NRHP in Searcy County, Arkansas
- Vinie McCall House, Marshall, Arkansas, listed on the NRHP in Searcy County, Arkansas
- Cormack McCall House, Faribault, Minnesota, listed on the NRHP in Rice County, Minnesota
- Thomas McCall House, Faribault, Minnesota, listed on the NRHP in Rice County, Minnesota
- Tracy McCall House, Fromberg, Montana, listed on the NRHP in Carbon County, Montana
- Mansion House (Trenton, New Jersey), also known as McCall House, listed on the NRHP in Mercer County, New Jersey
- McCall House (Fayetteville, North Carolina), NRHP-listed
- John McCall House, Ashland, Oregon, listed on the NRHP in Jackson County, Oregon
- Clarence McCall House, Darlington, South Carolina, listed on the NRHP in Darlington County, South Carolina
- Smithson-McCall Farm, Bethesda, Tennessee, NRHP-listed
