= Clarence Peck Residence =

Historic house in Wisconsin, United States

- U.S. National Register of Historic Places
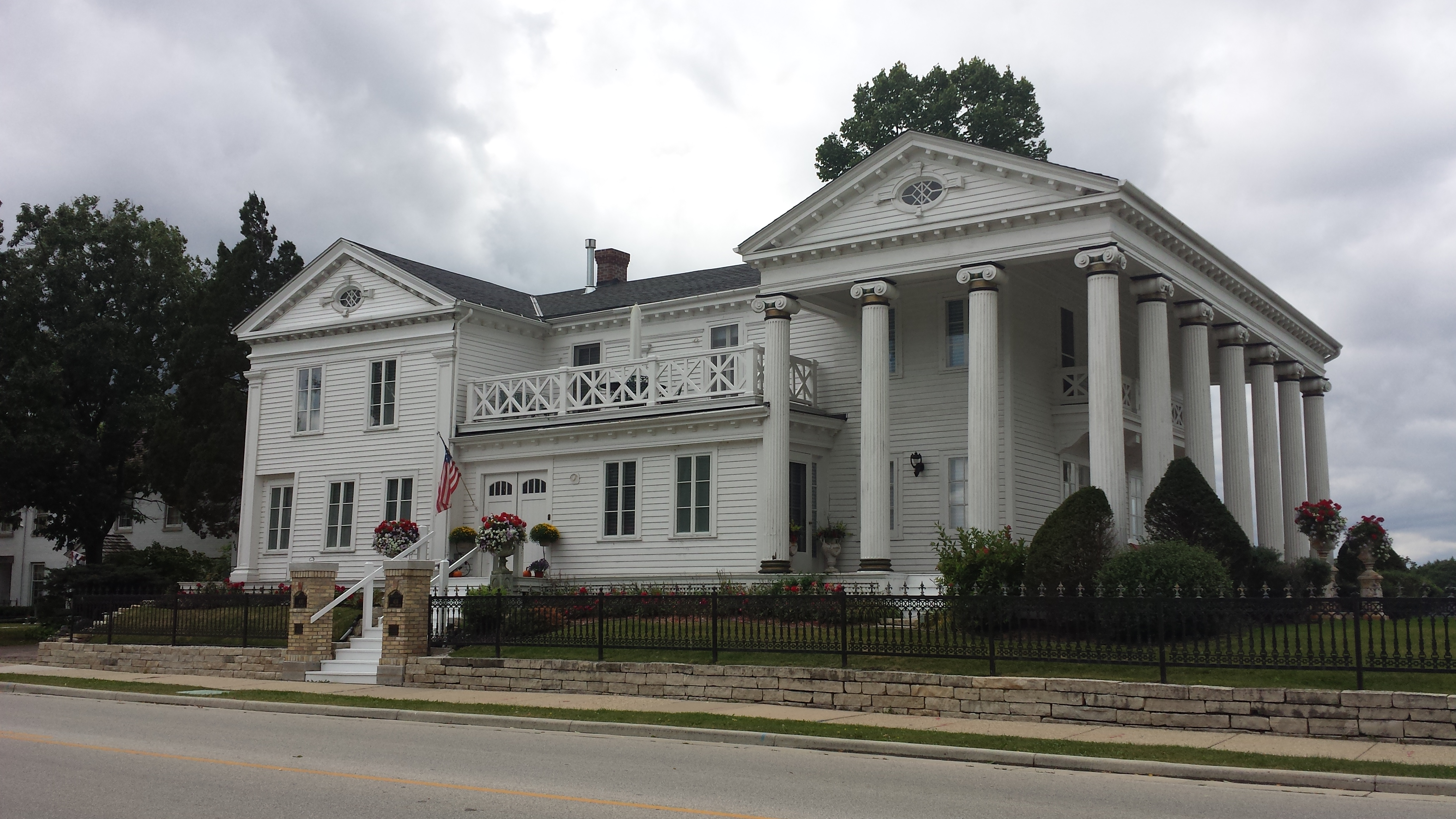
- Clarence Peck Residence, street view.

- Location within Wisconsin Location within the United States
- Location: 430 and 434 N. Lake Rd., Oconomowoc, Wisconsin
- Coordinates: 43°6′57″N 88°30′0″W
- Area: less than one acre
- Built: 1846
- Architect: George B. Ferry
- Architectural style: Classical Revival, Greek Revival
- NRHP reference No.: 87002569
- Added to NRHP: January 28, 1988

The Clarence Peck Residence, also known as the Dr. Hosea Townsend House, Madame Peck Residence, and Old White House, is a Greek Revival styled home. It was home to Clarence Peck, and is located at 430-434 Lake Dr., Oconomowoc, Wisconsin at the East end of Lac La Belle and south of the Lac La Belle dam. It consists of two sections, the main house, started in 1846, and an addition on the north, built c. 1859. The two sections were connected by an enclosed porch, which was removed about 1923, leaving two separate houses. It has since been reconverted to a single residence.

== History ==
The house was originally built by Martin Townsend for his son, Dr. Hosea B. Townsend. Dr. Townsend was the area's first physician. The house passed through a succession of short-term owners, including two other doctors and use as a school for boys.

In 1872, Mrs. Phillip F. W. Peck, also known as "Madame" Peck, of Chicago purchased the property, where it became a hub for area socializing and yachting. The Peck family is attributed to elevating the status of the area as a summer destination for elite Chicago families.

In 1878, Clarence Peck acquired the property from his mother and in 1893 began extensive modifications, including the installation of ten columns on the north portion of the house. The columns had been imported from the 1893 World's Columbian Exposition.

== See also ==
- Ferdinand Peck
