= John A. Rice (politician) =

19th century American politician

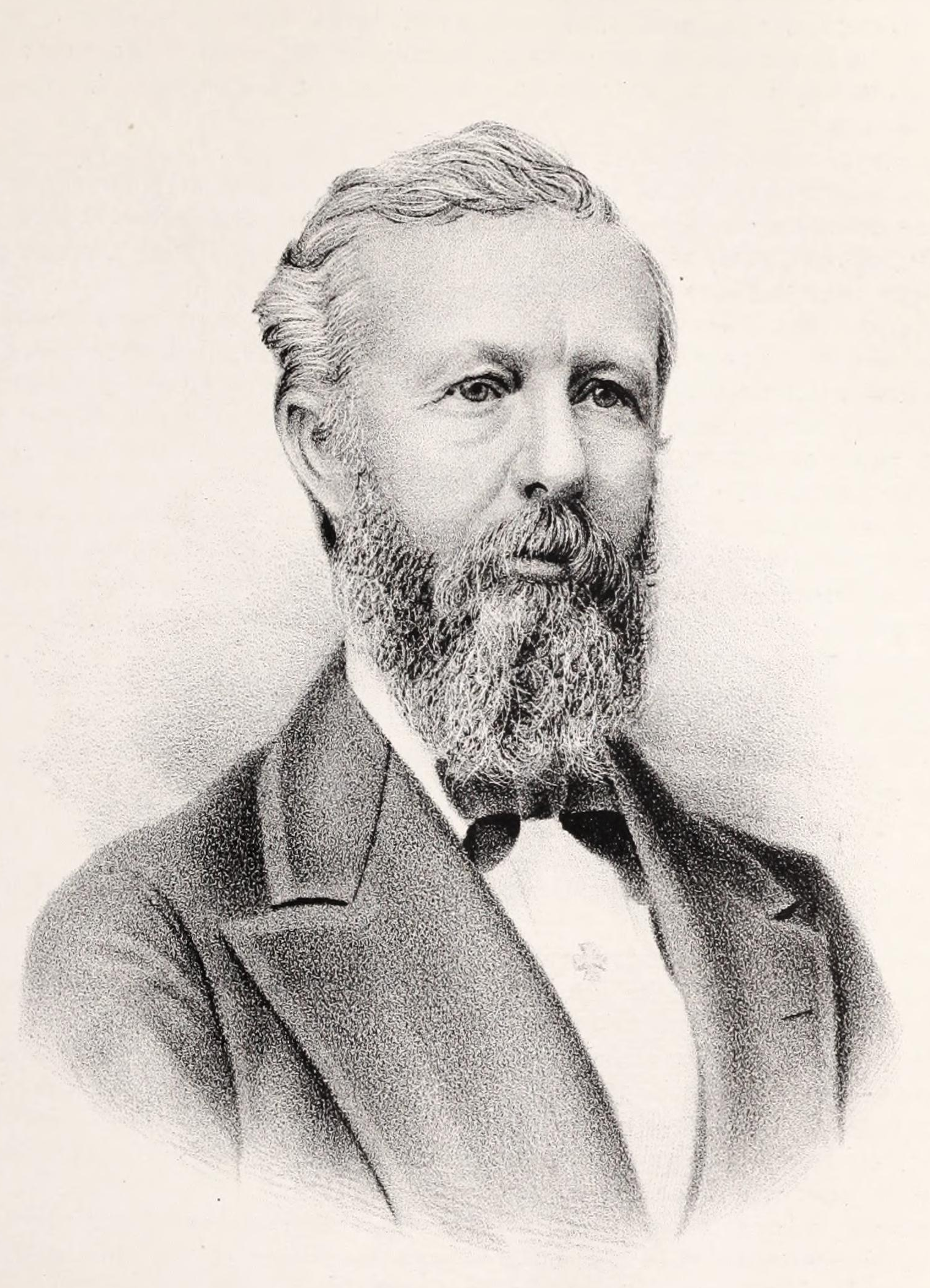
- From The History of Waukesha County, Wisconsin (1880)

Member of the Wisconsin Senate from the 10th district
- In office January 7, 1878 – January 5, 1880
- Preceded by: William Blair
- Succeeded by: Richard Weaver
- In office January 5, 1874 – January 3, 1876
- Preceded by: William Blair
- Succeeded by: William Blair
- In office January 3, 1870 – January 1, 1872
- Preceded by: Curtis Mann
- Succeeded by: William Blair

Personal details
- Born: March 17, 1832 Ticonderoga, New York, U.S.
- Died: August 18, 1906 (aged 74) Merton, Wisconsin, U.S.
- Resting place: Village of Hartland Cemetery, Hartland, Wisconsin
- Party: Democratic
- Spouse: Caroline J. Caswell (m. 1853; died 1865)
- Children: May (Cowie)
- Education: Western Reserve Medical College
- Profession: Physician

John Ashley Rice (March 17, 1832 – August 18, 1906) was an American physician, Democratic politician, and Wisconsin pioneer. He served six years in the Wisconsin State Senate, representing Waukesha County. He was also a witness at the trial of Charles J. Guiteau for the assassination of U.S. President James A. Garfield.

== Biography ==
Rice was born on March 17, 1832, in Ticonderoga, New York. As a young man, he studied medicine with Dr. Harris, in Fleming County, Kentucky. He then attended Western Reserve Medical College, of Hudson, Ohio, where he graduated in 1852. That same year, he moved to the town of Merton, Wisconsin, in Waukesha County, where he started a medical practice.

Rice's medical practice flourished, and within a decade he was considered one of the foremost physicians in the state. He also became active in politics as a member of the Democratic Party. He was elected to three non-consecutive terms in the Wisconsin State Senate, representing Waukesha County in the 1870, 1871, 1874, 1875, 1878, and 1879 sessions. He was the Democratic nominee for Lieutenant Governor of Wisconsin in the 1871 election, but was defeated by Milton Pettit.

In addition to his medical career, Rice became a celebrated archaeologist in his later years. In the 1870s, he participated in an industrial expedition to Mexico and formed a friendly relationship with Mexican President Porfirio Díaz. Díaz furnished him with a personal military guard which accompanied him around the country, visiting various sites of interest. At the end of his side, he was inducted into the Sociedad Mexicana de Geografía y Estadística (Mexican Society for Geography and Statistics) the oldest such society in the Americas.

He received national notoriety when he testified as a defense witness at the trial of Charles J. Guiteau for the assassination of U.S. President James A. Garfield. Guiteau's defense counsel was attempting to argue that he had been insane at the time of the murder. Dr. Rice had examined Guiteau five years earlier—in 1876—to consider his sanity. Rice pronounced him insane at that time, but Guiteau fled the county to avoid being committed to an institution. In his testimony in 1881, Dr. Rice went on to explain the behaviors he observed in Guiteau that led to that insanity diagnosis, including religious delusions.

Rice died at his home on Lake Keesus in the town of Merton on August 18, 1906.

== Personal life and family ==
Rice married Caroline Caswell in 1852. They had four children before her death in 1864. Rice was survived by only one child, his daughter May.

== Electoral history ==
=== Wisconsin Senate (1869) ===
Wisconsin Senate, 10th District Election, 1869
Party	Candidate	Votes	%	±%
General Election, November 2, 1869
Democratic	John A. Rice	2,671	55.32%	
Republican	Vernon Tichener	2,157	44.68%	
Plurality		514	10.65%	
Total votes		4,828	100.0%	
Democratic hold				

=== Wisconsin Lieutenant Governor (1871) ===
Wisconsin Lieutenant Gubernatorial Election, 1871
Party	Candidate	Votes	%	±%
General Election, November 7, 1871
Republican	Milton Pettit	77,751	53.05%	−0.80%
Democratic	John A. Rice	68,807	46.95%	
Plurality		8,944	6.10%	-1.60%
Total votes		146,558	100.0%	+13.24%
Republican hold				

=== Wisconsin Senate (1873) ===
Wisconsin Senate, 10th District Election, 1873
Party	Candidate	Votes	%	±%
General Election, November 4, 1873
Democratic	John A. Rice	2,541	53.74%	+6.18%
Republican	William Blair (incumbent)	2,187	46.26%	
Plurality		354	7.49%	
Total votes		4,728	100.0%	-4.10%
Democratic gain from Republican				

=== Wisconsin Senate (1877) ===
Wisconsin Senate, 10th District Election, 1877
Party	Candidate	Votes	%	±%
General Election, November 4, 1877
Democratic	John A. Rice	2,499	50.33%	+3.79%
Republican	John C. Schuette	2,466	49.67%	
Plurality		33	0.66%	
Total votes		4,965	100.0%	-0.92%
Democratic gain from Republican				

Party political offices
Preceded by Hamilton H. Gray	Democratic nominee for Lieutenant Governor of Wisconsin; 1871	Succeeded by Charles D. Parker
Wisconsin Senate
Preceded by Curtis Mann	Member of the Wisconsin State Assembly from the 10th district January 3, 1870 – January 1, 1872	Succeeded by William Blair
Preceded by William Blair	Member of the Wisconsin State Assembly from the 10th district January 5, 1874 – January 3, 1876	Succeeded by William Blair
Preceded by William Blair	Member of the Wisconsin State Assembly from the 10th district January 7, 1878 – January 5, 1880	Succeeded by Richard Weaver
