= Delafield Fish Hatchery =

- U.S. National Register of Historic Places
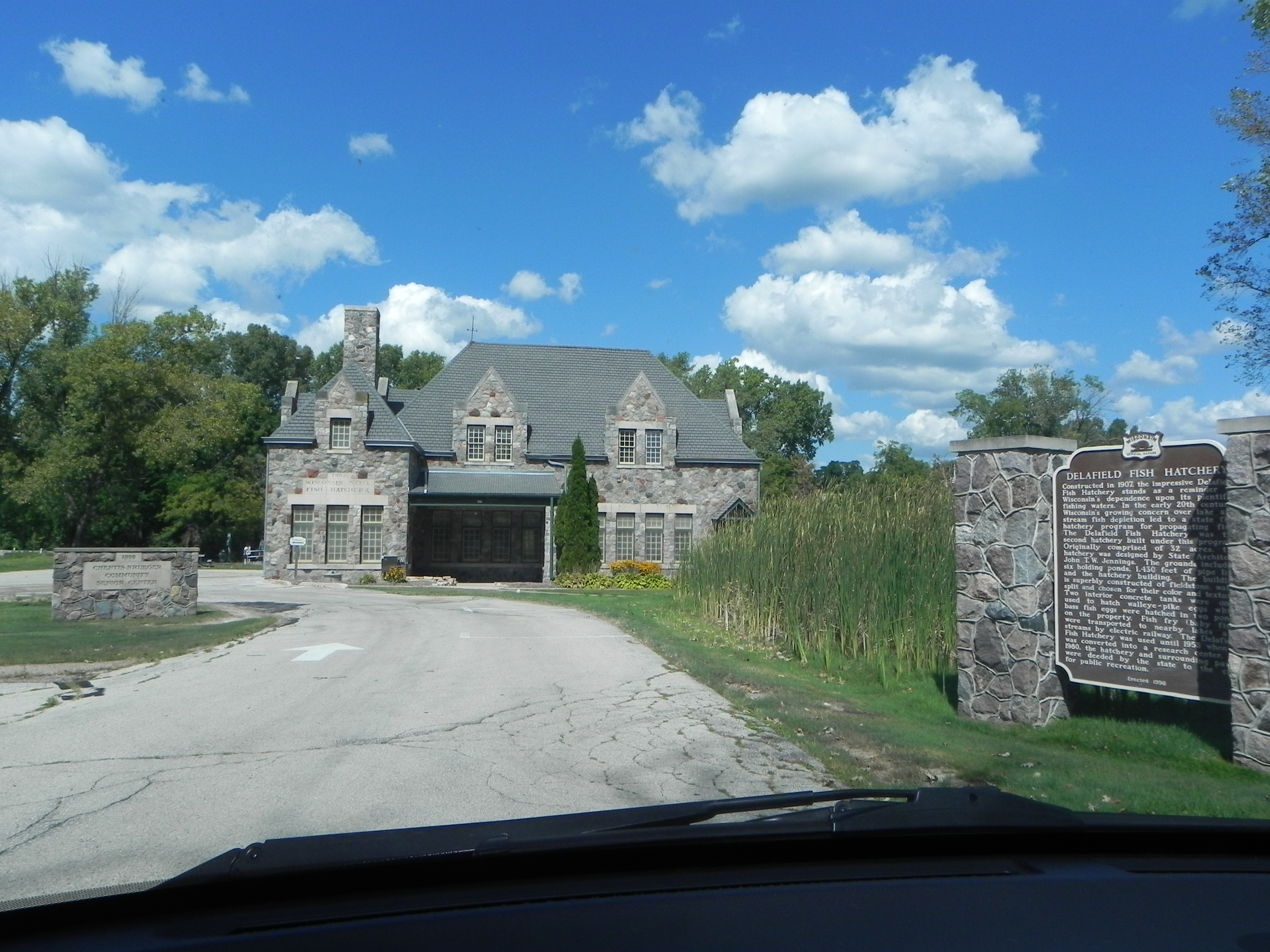
- Interactive map of Delafield Fish Hatchery
- Location: 421 Main St. Delafield, Wisconsin
- Coordinates: 43°3′40.54″N 88°24′25.31″W
- Built: 1907
- Architect: J. T. W. Jennings
- Architectural style: Victorian
- NRHP reference No.: 81000064
- Added to NRHP: May 13, 1981

The Delafield Fish Hatchery was established in 1906 in Delafield, Wisconsin as part of a state system to stock game fish fry into Wisconsin lakes and streams. The hatchery was added to the National Register of Historic Places in 1981.

== History ==
In the 1870s a nationwide movement for fish hatcheries emerged, aimed at supplying freshwater fish for consumers and sportsmen. Wisconsin started its own program in 1874.

In 1906 the Delafield Fish Hatchery was established - the second hatchery in this state system. Two bass-rearing ponds were built that first year. Four more were built the following year, along with the stylish stone building that survives today. J.T.W. Jennings designed the building in Tudor Revival style, with a steep hip roof, prominent chimney, parapets above the dormers, and walls of colorful fieldstone. It contained offices and two walleye tanks. The hatchery drew its water from Nagawicka Lake.

Walleye fry were propagated by placing eggs in Chase jars. Then water was fed into the bottom of the jar, passing up through the eggs. After the fish hatched they swam through the jars to the two large tanks, from which they were transferred to lakes and streams. The Delafield hatchery could produce 50 million walleye fry per year.

bass were grown in the six outdoor ponds - a more natural environment. Adult bass were allowed to build nests and fertilize the eggs. When the youngsters hatched and grew enough, they were transferred from the ponds to the wild.

The hatcheries fry mostly went to lakes and streams in southern Wisconsin. It served that original purpose until 1950, when bass were successfully reproducing in the wild, and the state decided to focus its walleye propagation on the northern part of the state. With that, the Delafield hatchery was converted into a research center on bass and walleye. In 1980, the state deeded the site to the city and has since been used for public recreation.
