= Haseltine Cobblestone House =

Historic house in Wisconsin, United States

- U.S. National Register of Historic Places
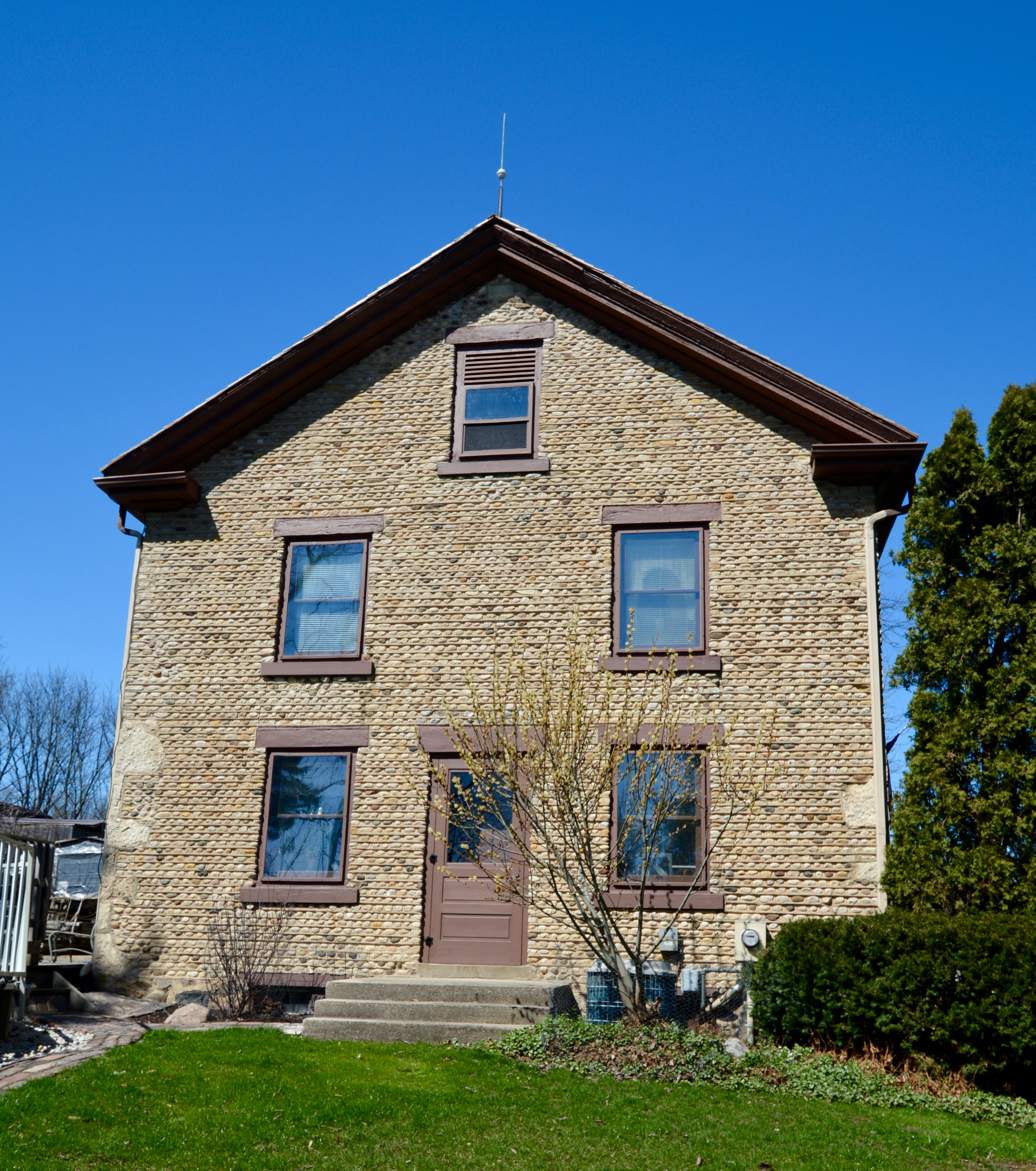
- Haseltine Cobblestone House
- Location: W230 S8235 Big Bend Dr. Big Bend, Waukesha County, Wisconsin
- Coordinates: 42°53′38″N 88°12′34″W
- Area: 11.5 acres (4.7 ha)
- Built: 1842
- Architect: Orien Haseltine
- Architectural style: Greek Revival
- NRHP reference No.: 80000204
- Added to NRHP: January 15, 1980

The Haseltine Cobblestone House is a Greek Revival-styled home clad in cobblestone and built in 1842 in Big Bend, Waukesha County, Wisconsin for one of the town's first settlers.

== History ==
The house was built for Orien Haseltine, originally of Andover, Vermont. His family would be the first settlers of Vernon, Wisconsin. The house was listed on the National Register of Historic Places in 1980 and on the State Register of Historic Places in 1989.
