= Camillia Smith House =

Historic house in Wisconsin, United States

- U.S. National Register of Historic Places
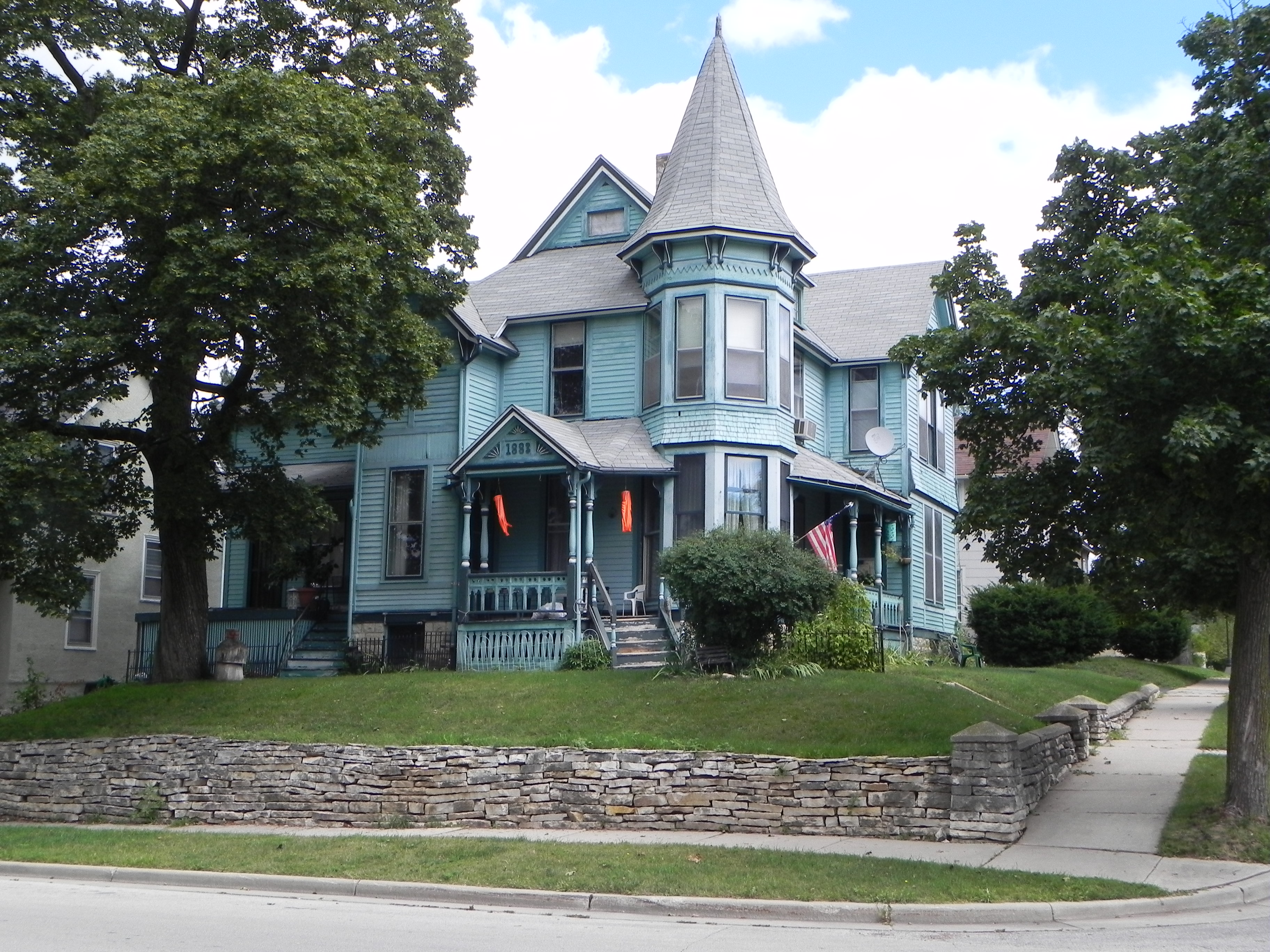
- Camillia Smith House
- Location: 603 N. West Ave., Waukesha, Wisconsin
- Coordinates: 43°00′32″N 88°14′10″W
- Area: less than one acre
- Built: 1883
- Architectural style: Queen Anne
- MPS: Waukesha MRA
- NRHP reference No.: 83004358
- Added to NRHP: October 28, 1983

The Camillia Smith House is a Queen Anne-styled house built in Waukesha, Wisconsin in 1883. It was added to the National Register of Historic Places in 1983 and to the State Register of Historic Places in 1989.

The house has many standard features of Queen Anne style: asymmetric design, corner tower, complex roof, and shingled wall surfaces to vary the textures.
