= McCall House (Fayetteville, North Carolina) =

Historic house in North Carolina, United States

- U.S. National Register of Historic Places
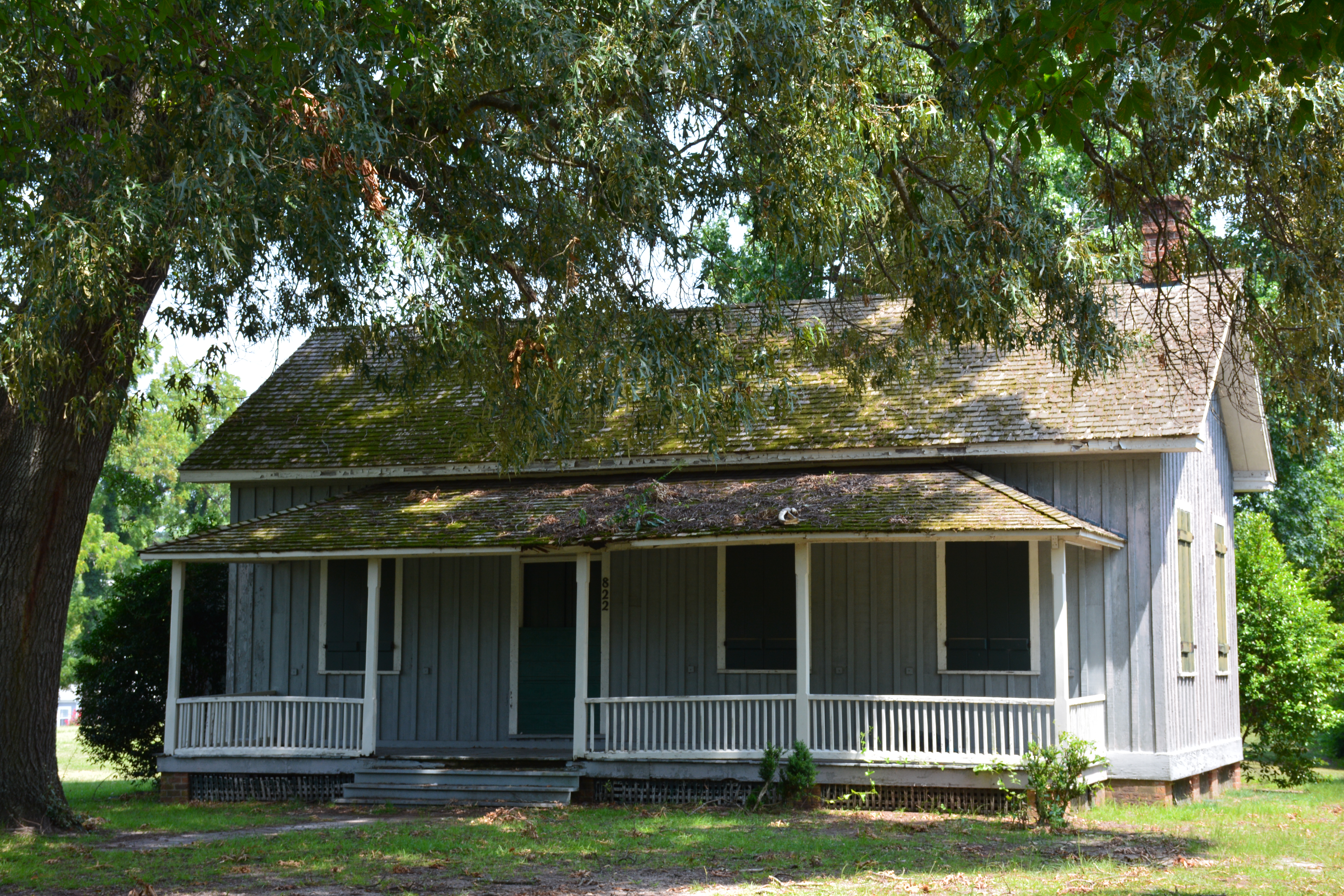

- Location within North Carolina Location within the United States
- Location: 822 Arsenal Ave., Fayetteville, North Carolina
- Coordinates: 35°3′18″N 78°53′39″W
- Area: less than one acre
- Built: 1862
- MPS: Fayetteville MRA
- NRHP reference No.: 83001862
- Added to NRHP: July 7, 1983

The McCall House, also known as the Arsenal House, is a historic home located at Fayetteville, Cumberland County, North Carolina. It was built about 1862, and is a small one-story, four-bay, frame building with board-and-batten siding. It rests on a brick pier foundation and has a gable roof. The front facade features a full-width, hip roof porch.

It was listed on the National Register of Historic Places in 1983.
