= Saylesville, Waukesha County, Wisconsin =

Saylesville, Wisconsin
- Unincorporated community
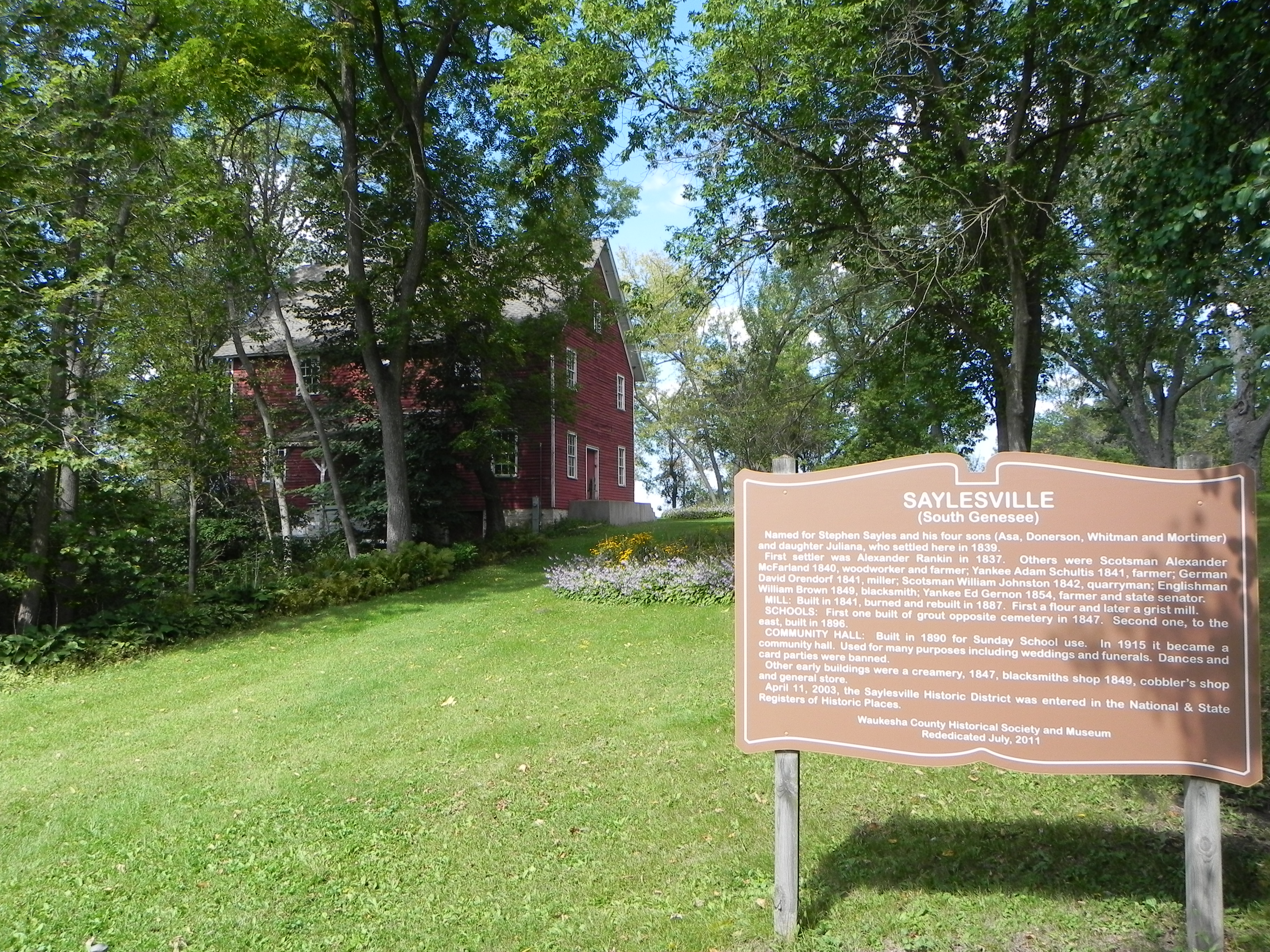

- Location within Wisconsin Location within the United States
- Coordinates: 42°56′58″N 88°19′13″W
- Country: United States
- State: Wisconsin
- County: Waukesha

Government Town of Genesee
  - Type: Unincorporated
- Elevation: 810 ft (250 m)
- Time zone: UTC-6 (Central (CST))
  - Summer (DST): UTC-5 (CDT)
- Postal code: 53189
- Area code: 262
- GNIS feature ID: 1573762

Saylesville is an unincorporated community located in the town of Genesee, Waukesha County, Wisconsin, United States. Saylesville is located 6 miles (9.7 km) southwest of Waukesha, and runs 2.5 miles east along County Road X, from Wis Highway 83. Saylesville is home to the J. C. Booth House and the William Johnston Lime Kiln, both of which are listed on the National Register of Historic Places. It is also home to the Saylesville Millpond, and Genesee Creek, which connects to the Fox River.
