= First German Reformed Church =

Historic church in Wisconsin, United States

- U.S. National Register of Historic Places
- Location within Wisconsin Location within the United States
- Location: 413 Wisconsin Ave., Waukesha, Wisconsin
- Coordinates: 43°0′34″N 88°14′6″W
- Area: less than one acre
- Built: 1891
- Built by: Ward, George
- Architect: Haeuser, Hugo C.
- Architectural style: Late Victorian
- NRHP reference No.: 91001390
- Added to NRHP: September 13, 1991

First German Reformed Church was a historic church built in 1891 at 413 Wisconsin Avenue in Waukesha, Wisconsin, United States. It was added to the National Register of Historic Places in 1991. The 1891 building burned to the ground in 2005.

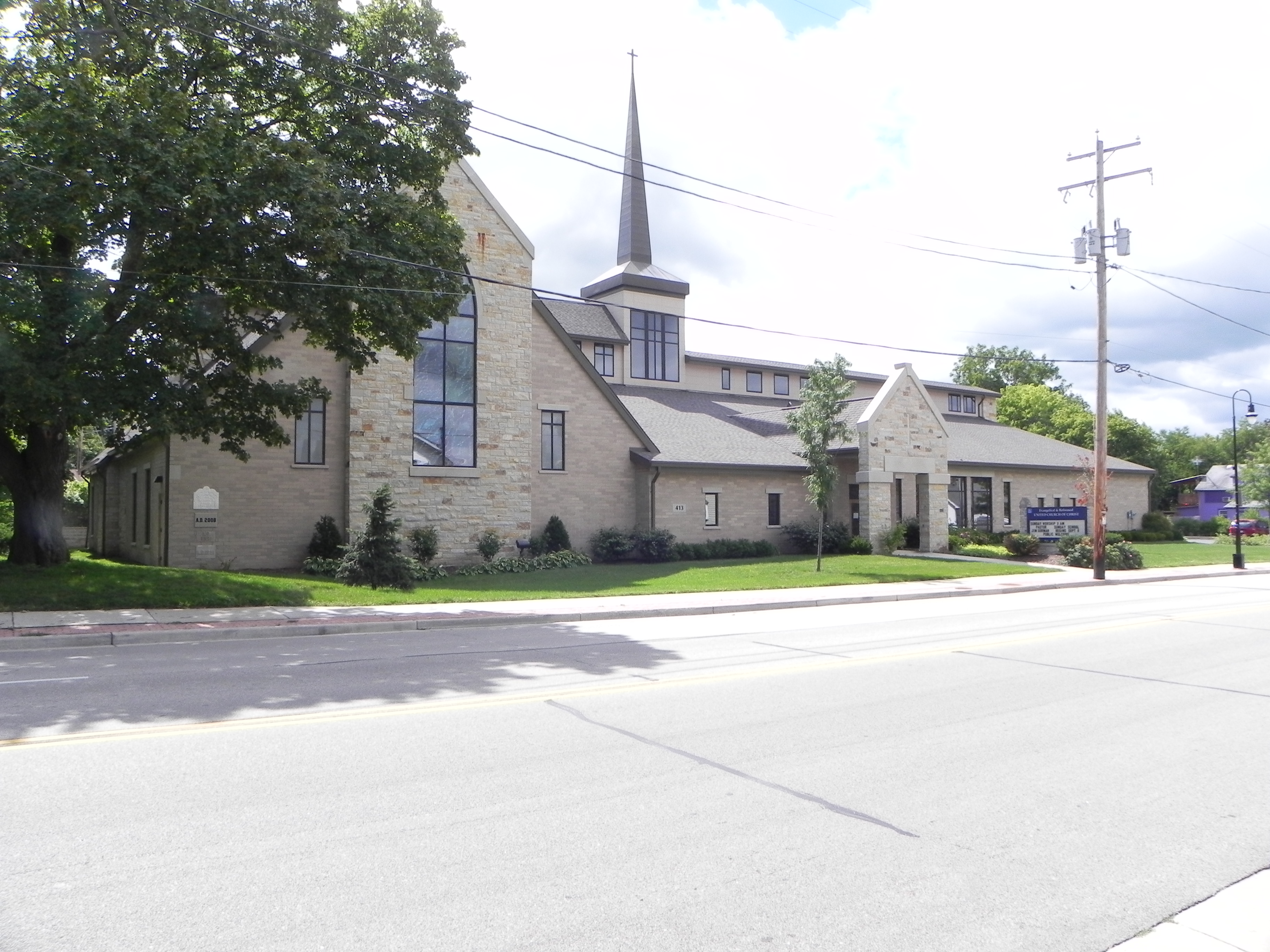
New church complex built after the 2005 fire

First German's congregation began in 1866, when Prof. H. Kurtz, a missionary from Germany, organized the Erste Deutsche Reformierte Kirche (First German Reformed Church) among the German-speaking immigrants in Waukesha. By 1880 the congregation had grown to 190 communicants and was worshiping in a large stone structure built in 1840 to house the Prairieville Academy, which had moved on to become Carroll College. By 1890 First German had outgrown its building, so they decided to tear it down and build a new church on the same site.

The floor-plan of the 1891 building was a 39 by 71 foot rectangular. The walls were wood frame clad in cream brick, on a raised foundation of rock-faced Waukesha limestone blocks. The walls were broken by tall round-arched windows, and separated into bays by pilasters in the brick. At the center of the north end stood a large rectangular tower, with the church's main entrance originally at its bottom. The first stage of the tower was brick, the second stage was a wood-sided lantern, and the third stage was an ornate belfry and steeple, topped with a cross. The style was High Victorian eclectic, with the symmetry and vertical lines drawn from Gothic Revival style, the rustic foundation and round arches from Romanesque Revival style, and the pilasters perhaps from Greek Revival. The architect is unknown. This 1891 building cost $8000.

Inside, two rows of pews faced the altar at the south end. Walls were plastered, with wooden wainscoting at the base. Space inside the nave rose to the collar beams, which supported a flat ceiling.

Services were conducted entirely in German until around WWI, when they shifted to both German and English. Gradually, use of the German language dwindled.

In 1924–25, an annex (chapel) was added east of the nave to handle membership that had grown to 716. H.C. Haeuser of Milwaukee designed it to match the 1891 building, with a bit of Tudor Revival style added - yet another style. At the same time, Haeuser directed renovations inside the old nave.

First German added a Wangerin-Weickhardt pipe organ in the early 1900s. In the late 1940s the congregation bought a house at the corner of Wisconsin and Maple for a new parsonage, and the old parsonage was converted to a parish house, and the old garage to a youth cottage. By the 1950s membership passed 1000, and in 1956 a modern-styled brick educational building and new vestibule entry replaced the old parsonage.

In 1934, First German's denomination merged with other similar denominations into the Evangelical and Reformed Church, and First German Reformed Church changed its name to First Evangelical and Reformed Church of Waukesha. In 1956 the parent denomination merged with others to become the United Church of Christ, and the Waukesha congregation again changed its name, to Evangelical and Reformed United Church of Christ.

In December 2005 a fire destroyed the old 1891 building. Little was left, so the congregation built a new church on the same site.
