= Sen. William Blair House =

Historic house in Wisconsin, United States

- U.S. National Register of Historic Places
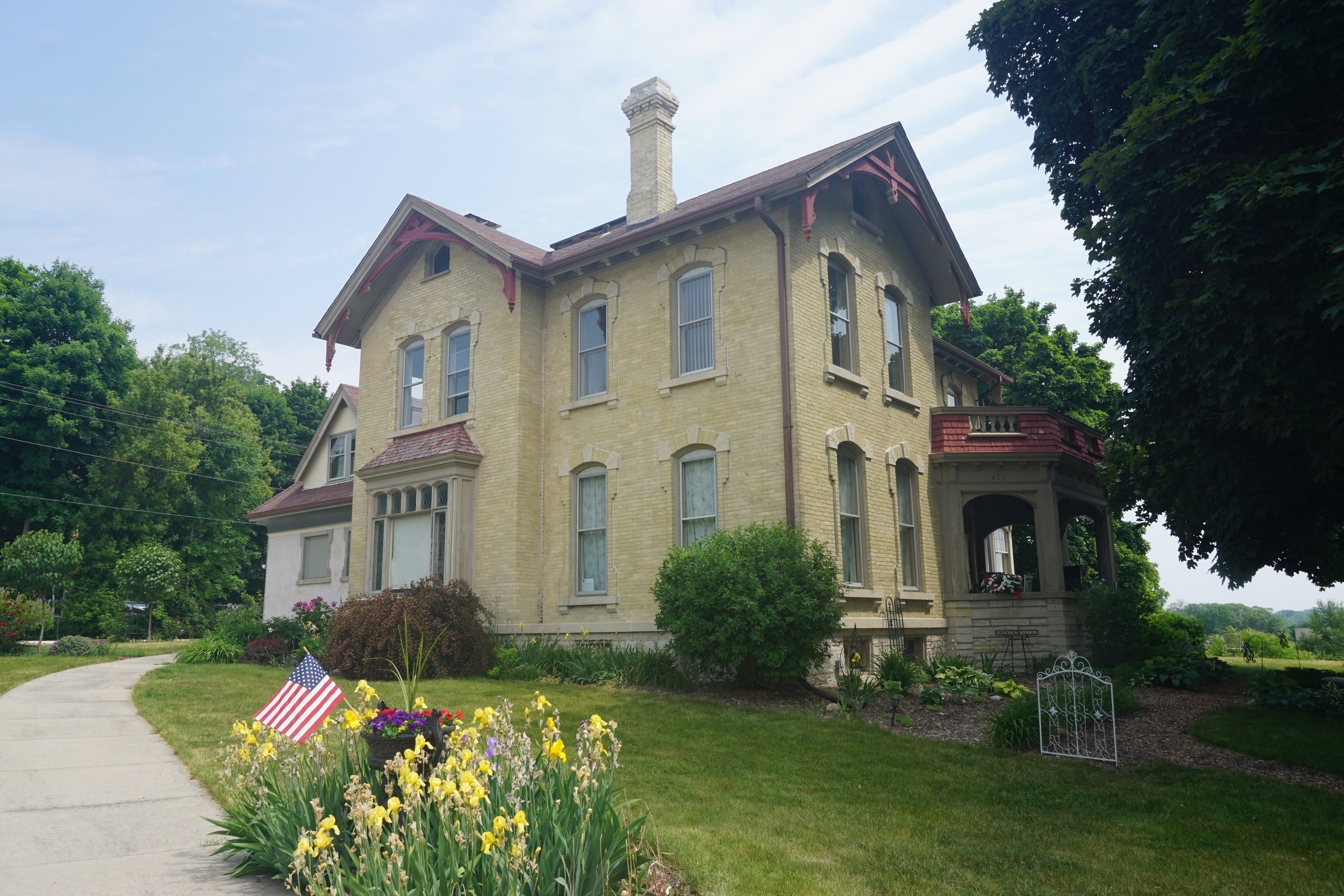

- Location within Wisconsin Location within the United States
- Interactive map showing the location of Senator William Blair House
- Location: 434 Madison St. Waukesha, Wisconsin
- Coordinates: 43°0′50″N 88°14′12″W
- Area: less than one acre
- Built: 1876
- Built by: Dodd, Samuel
- Architectural style: Italianate
- MPS: Waukesha MRA
- NRHP reference No.: 83004327
- Added to NRHP: October 28, 1983

The Sen. William Blair House is located in Waukesha, Wisconsin, United States, and was listed on the National Register of Historic Places in 1983.

It was built for State Senator William Blair (1820-1880), who was a prominent businessman and politician. The house's historical significance derives from its association with Blair, as well as its contribution as an example of Italianate architecture in Waukesha. The exterior of the house is still an example of its style, though an addition was added in 1997, as well as a window replacement and other minor changes. The interior was significantly modified.

The house has had several uses over the years. The property was deeded to the city in 1957 by Henry Blair. He was the Mayor of Waukesha in 1922. The city first leased the property to the Great Blue Heron Girl Scouts and then to Waukesha Memorial Hospital until 2013.

In 2016 the Blair House was purchased by Bob and Lisa Salb from the city, after a Request for Proposal process that started in 2014. It was rezoned as residential and they are restoring the property as their home.

The house and landscape are undergoing extensive restoration. The stained glass transom and sidelites were returned to the house and reinstalled with the porch door, found in the basement. The porch walls were reopened to the view from the Blair Hill, which overlooks downtown Waukesha. Suspended ceiling tiles have been removed, revealing tall ceilings with elaborate crown moulding. Under the commercial blue carpeting, quarter-sawn oak hardwood floors in the dining room and terracotta tiles in the sunroom were discovered. A hidden bathroom was found, with subway tiles under drywall on the walls and hex tiles on the floor. Outside many gardens have been added to the grounds, including a butterfly garden, hosta shade garden, and an orchard, connected by paths.

After the restoration is complete and a conditional use permit is issued, the Salbs will open the property as the Spring City Bed and Breakfast at the Historic Blair House.
