= Arlington Apartments (Edmonton) =

- Interactive map of the Arlington Apartments area

General information
- Architectural style: Edwardian
- Location: Edmonton, Canada
- Coordinates: 53.5390°N 113.5024°W
- Construction started: July 1909
- Completed: November 6, 1909
- Demolished: November 24, 2008
- Cost: $130,000
- Client: Arlington Apartment Company (consortium of local business leaders)

Technical details
- Size: 5 storey

Design and construction
- Engineer: Robert Grant

The Arlington Apartments or The Arlington was the first apartment building to open in Edmonton, Alberta, Canada, in 1909. The 49 suite, five-storey redbrick building stood at 100 Avenue and 106 Street until 2005 when it was destroyed by fire. The building was a prime example of Edmonton's pre-Great War building boom that managed to survive into the 21st century.

The building was financed by a consortium of local business leaders who formed the Arlington Apartment Company. Among the original owners were George Swaisland, an Ontario-born banker who managed the Molson's Bank in Edmonton and Patrick O. Dwyer, president of Northern Investment Agency Limited.

Building construction was supervised by Robert Grant of Winnipeg; it was erected between July and December 1909 at a cost of $130,000.

The building was purchased by the Northern Investment Agency in 1932 for $85,000. In 1943 G. Patrick Ryan purchased it and founded Arlington Apartment Limited.

The building was a popular home for professionals and artists until the 1970s. By the 1980s residents were complaining of problems with prostitution. A fire in 1990 damaged but did not threaten the building.

The building was designated a Provincial Historic Resource in 1995, and a Municipal Historic Resource in 1998.

After the 2005 fire, there was an acrimonious confrontation between Edmonton's city government and the owner of the site, Saraswati P. Singh. The City demanded that the original facade (including the original bricks) be maintained during any reconstruction. In 2007, Singh agreed to incorporate three brick walls of the building into a 20-storey condominium project. In 2008, however, the site's architect said that that plan was no longer feasible, and asked for permission to demolish the ruins and reconstruct the facade with new bricks.

In September 2008, the City finally give the owners permission to tear down the building. In mid-November demolition began.

== Sources ==
- "Arlington Apartments". HistoricPlaces.ca.
- Herzog, Lawerence (April 14, 2005). "The End for Edmontons First Apartment Building". Real Estate Weekly. Realtors Association of Edmonton. Archived from the original on June 28, 2006.
- Ruttan, Susan (April 10, 2008). "Arlington Apartments can't be saved, owner says". Edmonton Journal. Canwest Global.
