= McCall Elementary School =

McCall Elementary School may refer to:

- George A. McCall School in Philadelphia
- Tom McCall Elementary School - Redmond School District - Redmond, Oregon
- Patricia Dean Boswell McCall Elementary School - Aledo Independent School District - Willow Park, Texas
- David McCall Elementary School - Plano Independent School District - Plano, Texas
