= Lake Lac La Belle, Wisconsin =

- Former Census-designated place
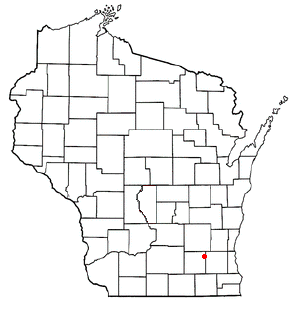
- Location of Lake Lac La Belle, Wisconsin
- Coordinates: 43°7′57″N 88°32′32″W
- Country: United States
- State: Wisconsin
- County: Jefferson
- Town: Ixonia

Area
  - Total: 0.97 sq mi (2.5 km^{2})
  - Land: 0.97 sq mi (2.5 km^{2})
  - Water: 0 sq mi (0.0 km^{2})
- Elevation: 920 ft (280 m)

Population (2000)
  - Total: 833
  - Density: 876/sq mi (338.3/km^{2})
- Time zone: UTC-6 (Central (CST))
  - Summer (DST): UTC-5 (CDT)
- FIPS code: 55-41591
- GNIS feature ID: 1852245

Lake Lac La Belle is a former census-designated place (CDP) in Jefferson County, Wisconsin, United States. The population was 833 at the 2000 census.

== Geography ==
Lake Lac La Belle is located at 43°7′57″N 88°32′32″W (43.132436, -88.542215).

According to the United States Census Bureau, the CDP has a total area of 0.9 square mile (2.5 km^{2}), all land.

== Demographics ==
As of the census of 2000, there were 833 people, 302 households, and 260 families residing in the CDP. The population density was 876.1 people per square mile (338.6/km^{2}). There were 305 housing units at an average density of 320.8/sq mi (124.0/km^{2}). The racial makeup of the CDP was 98.68% White, 0.12% African American, 0.36% Native American, 0.12% Asian, 0.24% from other races, and 0.48% from two or more races. Hispanic or Latino of any race were 1.32% of the population.

There were 302 households, out of which 34.8% had children under the age of 18 living with them, 78.1% were married couples living together, 5.6% had a female householder with no husband present, and 13.6% were non-families. 11.6% of all households were made up of individuals, and 5.3% had someone living alone who was 65 years of age or older. The average household size was 2.76 and the average family size was 2.97.

In the CDP, the population was spread out, with 25.6% under the age of 18, 5.6% from 18 to 24, 27.9% from 25 to 44, 31.2% from 45 to 64, and 9.7% who were 65 years of age or older. The median age was 39 years. For every 100 females, there were 99.8 males. For every 100 females age 18 and over, there were 102.6 males.

The median income for a household in the CDP was $67,917, and the median income for a family was $71,406. Males had a median income of $45,500 versus $29,375 for females. The per capita income for the CDP was $25,461. None of the families and 0.5% of the population were living below the poverty line, including no under eighteens and none of those over 64.
