= Chapel of St. Mary the Virgin =

Historic church in Wisconsin, United States

- U.S. National Register of Historic Places
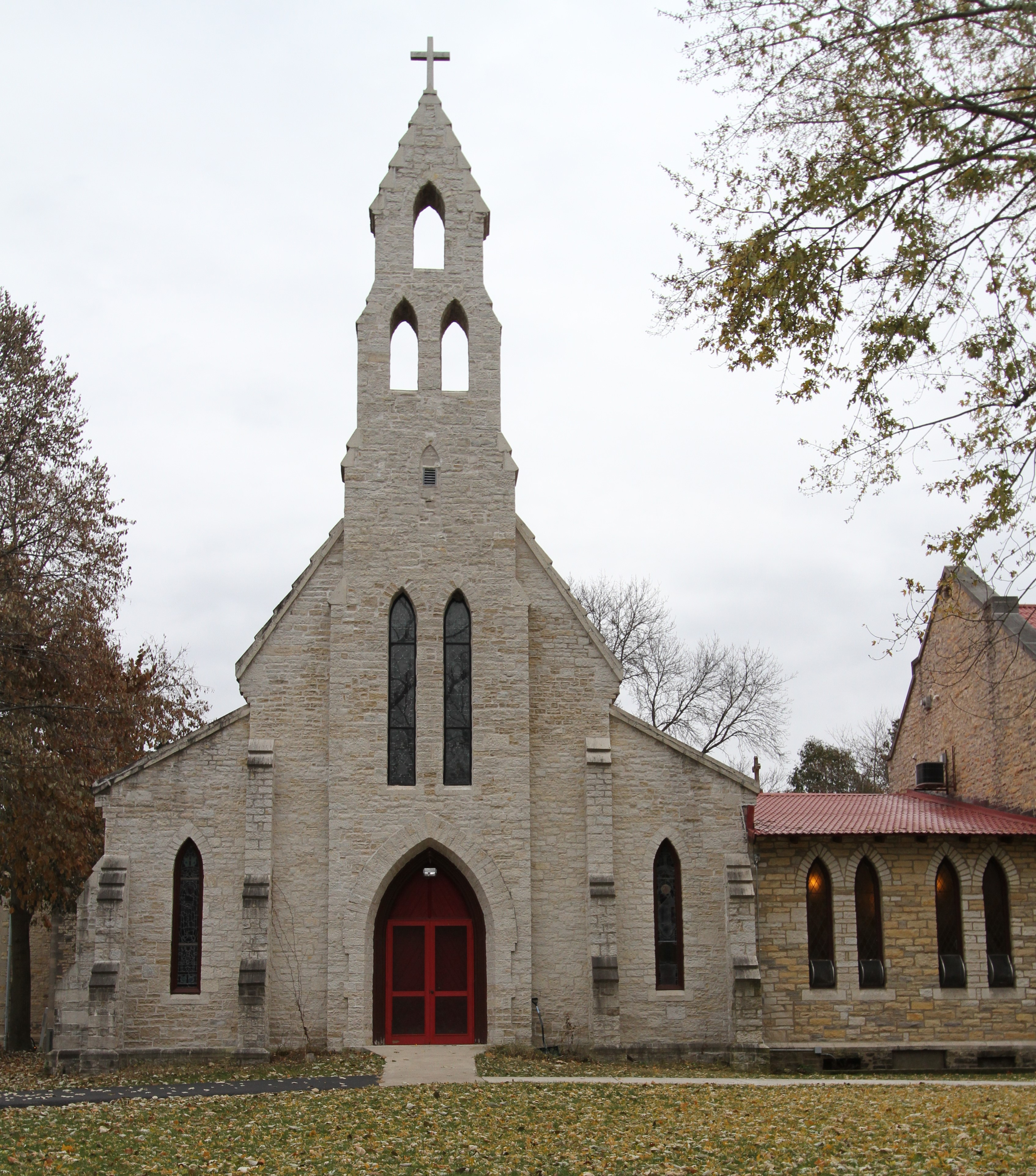
- The front of the chapel, from the west

- Location within Wisconsin Location within the United States
- Nearest city: Nashotah, Wisconsin
- Coordinates: 43°4′57″N 88°25′34″W
- Area: 0.3 acres (0.12 ha)
- Built: 1866
- Architect: James Douglas
- Architectural style: English Perpendicular Gothic
- NRHP reference No.: 72000067
- Added to NRHP: February 23, 1972

The Chapel of St. Mary the Virgin is a Gothic Revival-styled church completed in 1866 near Nashotah, Wisconsin - part of the Episcopal Nashotah House seminary. The chapel's design has been attributed to James Douglas and Richard Upjohn. On February 23, 1972, it was added to the National Register of Historic Places for its significance in architecture and religion.
