= Freewill Baptist Church (New Berlin, Wisconsin) =

Historic church in Wisconsin, United States

- U.S. National Register of Historic Places
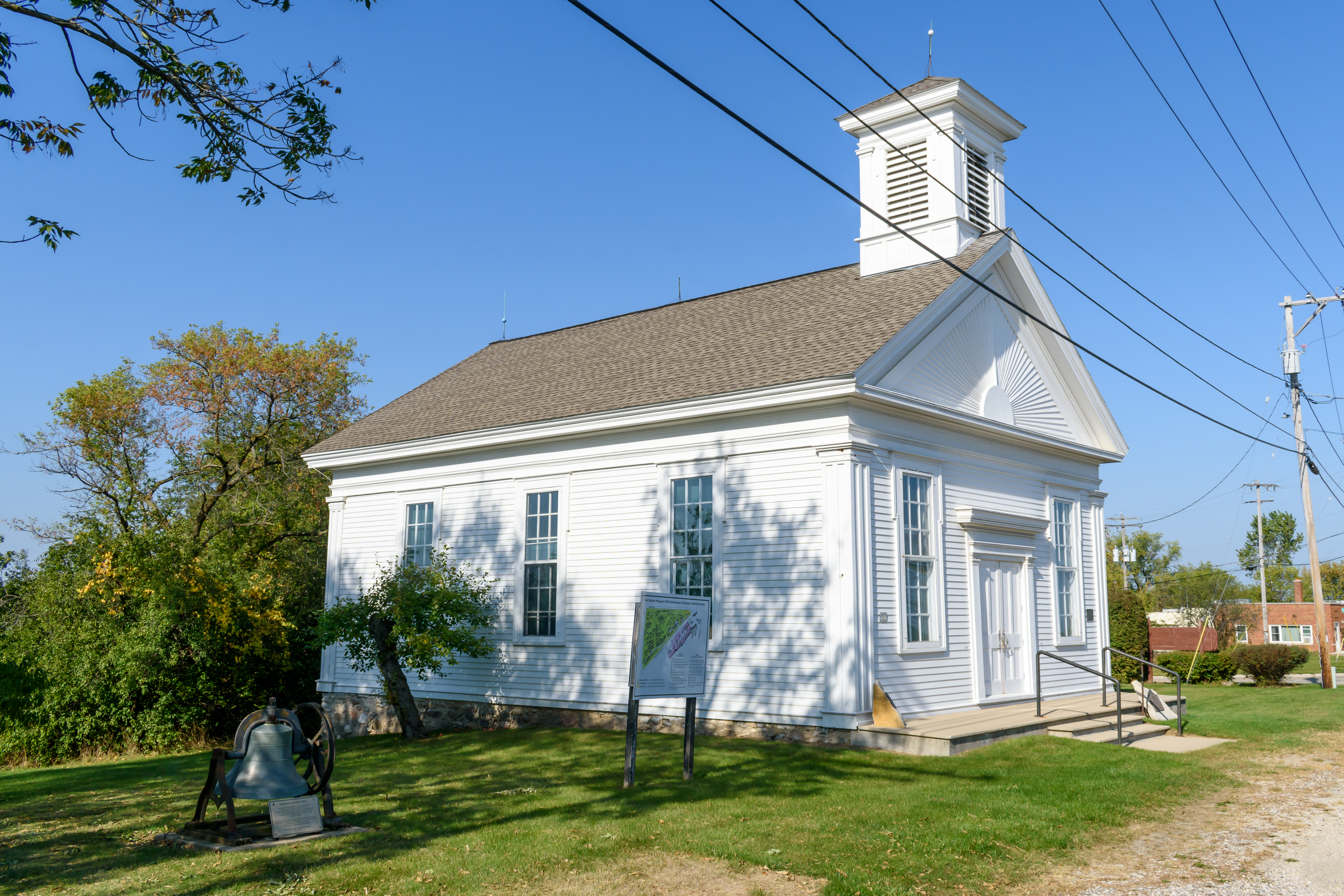

- Location within Wisconsin
- Interactive map showing the location of Freewill Baptist Church
- Location: 19750 W. National Ave., New Berlin, Wisconsin
- Coordinates: 42°56′40″N 88°9′37″W
- Area: 0.5 acres (0.20 ha)
- Built: 1859
- Built by: Church, Quincy W.
- Architectural style: Greek Revival
- NRHP reference No.: 97001409
- Added to NRHP: June 22, 1998

Freewill Baptist Church (also known as Prospect Aid Meeting House and Muskego Meeting House) is a historic church at 19750 W. National Avenue in New Berlin, Wisconsin, United States. It was built in 1859 and was added to the National Register of Historic Places in 1998.

The hamlet of Prospect Hill (now part of New Berlin) was settled in the 1830s, mostly by Yankees from New England and New York. Rufus Cheney of New Hampshire was one of them, and in 1840 he and his wife Ruth invited two other couples to found a Freewill Baptist church, the first such church in what would become the state of Wisconsin. This denomination is a variety of General Baptists with roots in England, and Cheney came from the northern branch founded by Benjamin Randall. The congregation at Prospect Hill grew, with more families joining and with the first baptism in 1843. That same year Cheney started a school in his house for the children of members. In 1845 Cheney was recognized as pastor, though he never took payment. Not all was rosy: records show that in 1845 Cheney made visits to "delinquent" members, and the next year there was a debate about whether members should drink alcohol. Meetings were held each week in Cheney's home.

The congregation grew and by 1858 had raised enough money to build a church. Quincy W. Church, a member of the congregation and son of Prospect Hill's first storekeeper, designed the building in Greek Revival style, following the pattern of some New England churches. Typical of Greek Revival, the building is symmetric across the front, with the main entry door in the middle. On each side is a tall 9 over 9 window, and the corners of the building are trimmed with pilasters with capitals. A frieze and cornice run above the pilasters and windows, and a pediment sits above that on the front. The pediment is decorated with an unusual (for Greek Revival) sunburst pattern formed from weatherboard. Above that, a square louvered belfry rises from the roof, itself topped with a small pyramidal roof.

Inside, the walls were originally lath and plaster. Deacon Hiram Hale was determined to have a choir loft, and paid for it himself. It stretched across the front of the building and was originally accessed by curved staircases at the corners of the building. The original church was expected to cost $1200, but Rev. Cheney and Hale added $300 to that.

The church has never had running water. Outside and down the hill is a small frame privy, almost hidden in the bushes. Northeast of the church there were also sheds for horses and buggies, but they are long gone.

The congregation was strongly abolitionist, collecting food and supplies for the Union Army, including "blankets, potatoes, horseradish, home-knit socks, caps and underwear and home made catsup." They were against alcohol, and had their own temperance society. The Ladies Aid Society was organized in 1886, raising money to buy furnishings and a bell for the church and sewing quilts for the Indian Children's Home in Council Bluffs, Iowa. Theodora W. Youmans, who grew up in the church, went on to become a pioneer woman journalist and a leader of the women's suffrage movement in Wisconsin.

By 1886 the Freewill Church managed to hire a full-time minister and built a parsonage. The hamlet of Prospect Hill had also grown to include two general stores, two stagecoach inns, four blacksmith shops, a sawmill, a creamery, a post office, a cider mill and grist mill, a planing mill, a school, a cobbler shop, and other businesses. The Freewill Baptists were the dominant group in the little community.

But membership declined, with attendance under a dozen by 1895. The congregation at Prospect Hill disbanded in 1925. To maintain the building, the Ladies Aid Society was renamed the Prospect Aid Society and opened to Christians of any denomination. The building was deeded to the new society as long as it "never be used for dancing, card-playing, or raffling."

The new/old organization installed a cookstove, converted some pews to tables, and hosted dinners, quilting bees, and summer Aid meetings in the building, with proceeds going to charities. The building also served as a temporary home for other denominations. By 1985 they had dropped the clause on card-playing from the deed, and were holding monthly card parties, with the money raised going to building maintenance and charities.

In 1985 a fire burned the roof, belfry and interior - a result of arson. Since then the church was restored to its old appearance, and lunches are again being served there.
