= William Blair (American politician) =

Wisconsin politician (1820–1880)

William Blair (31 July 1820, in Dundonald, Scotland – 13 July 1880, in Waukesha, Wisconsin) was a member of the Wisconsin State Senate three times. First, from 1864 to 1865, second, from 1872 to 1873 and third, from 1876 to 1877. Additionally, he was President of the Waukesha, Wisconsin, Board.

His former home, now known as the Sen. William Blair House, is listed on the National Register of Historic Places.
