= Arlington Apartments (Waukesha, Wisconsin) =

- U.S. National Register of Historic Places
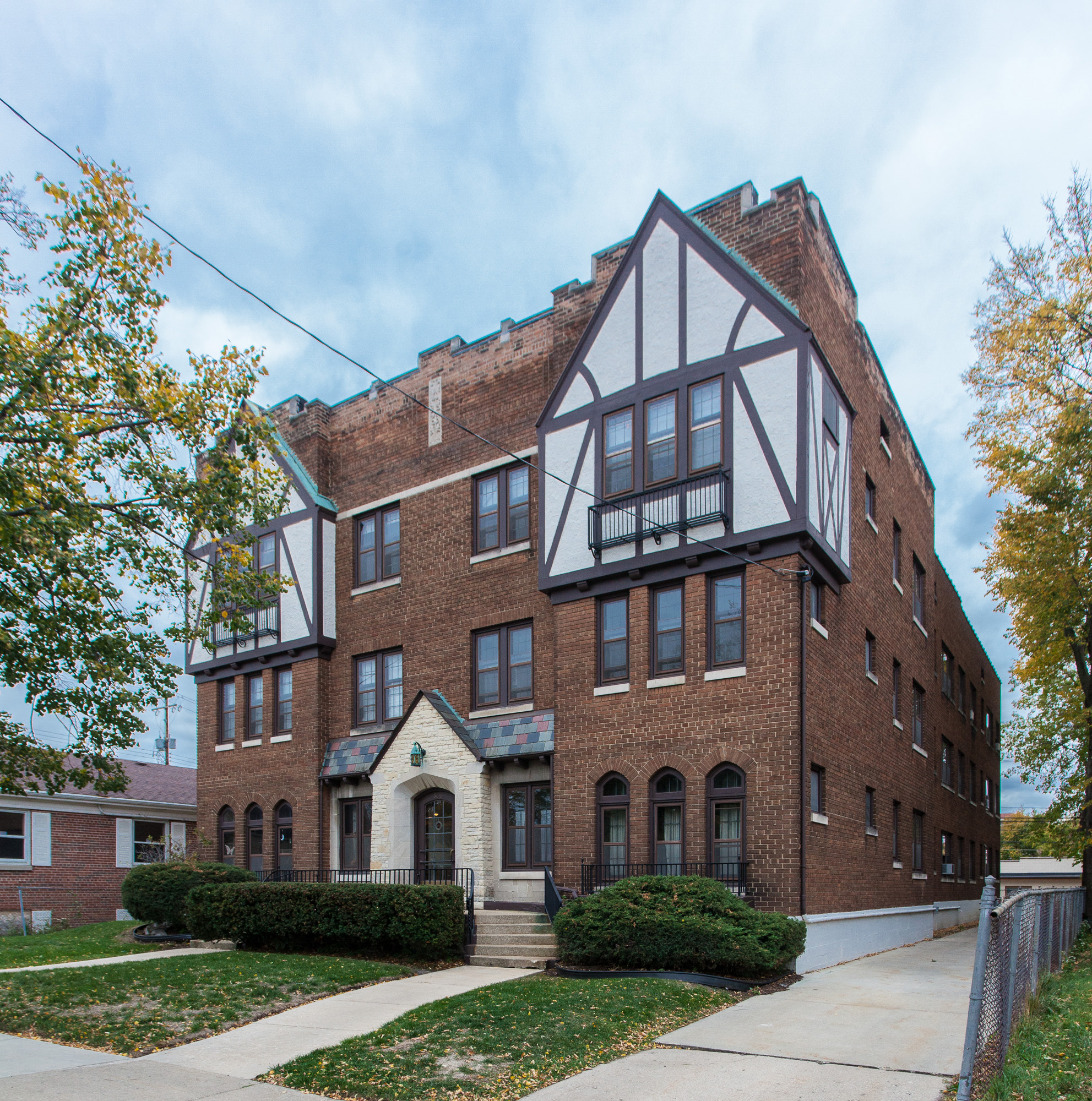
- Arlington Apartments
- Location: 309 Arlington St. Waukesha, Wisconsin
- Coordinates: 43.00633°N 88.23218°W
- Built: 1928
- Architectural style: Tudor Revival
- NRHP reference No.: 86003651
- Added to NRHP: January 21, 1987

The Arlington Apartments is a building in Waukesha, Wisconsin, USA, built in 1928. The property was added to the National Register of Historic Places in 1987.

It is a three-story red brick block with then-fashionable Tudor Revival style that is about 109 feet (33 m) by 46 feet (14 m). Tudor Revival was used for numerous houses in Waukesha, but this is the only Tudor Revival-style apartment building.

It was built as an 18-unit apartment building costing $60,000 that was to provide elegant apartments with modern/luxurious amenities including central heating and incinerator, shower baths and Frigidaire refrigerators in each apartment.

It was designed by George Zagel and Brother architects of Milwaukee, hired by the developer James Mahler, a real estate agent in Milwaukee.
