= McCall Street Historic District =

Historic district in Wisconsin, United States

- U.S. National Register of Historic Places
- U.S. Historic district
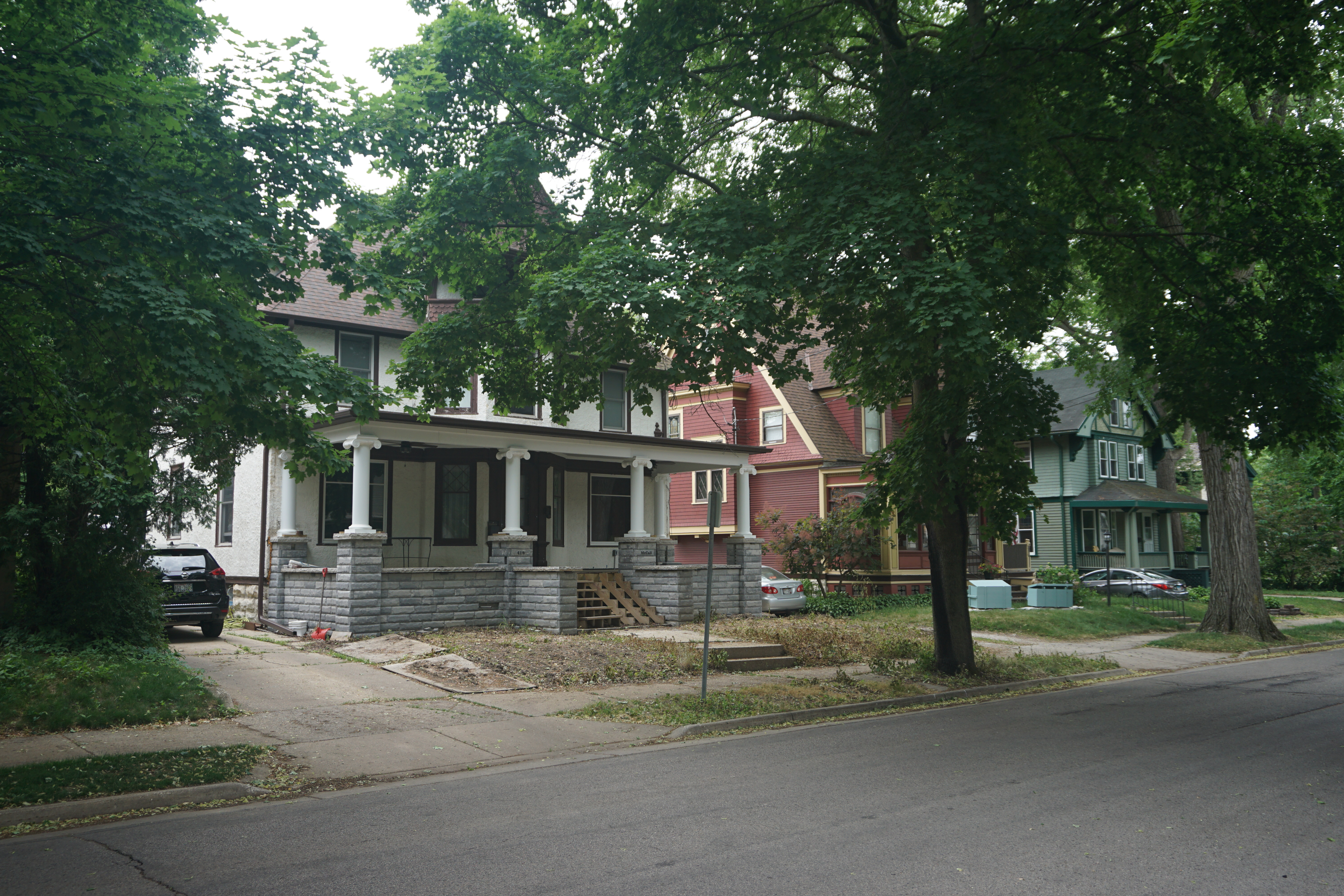

- Location within Wisconsin Location within the United States
- Location: McCall and James Sts., and N. East and Hartwell Aves. (original); Roughly, Charles and James Sts. from College Ave. to McCall St. and Hartwell Ave. from College to Grove St. (increase); Waukesha, Wisconsin
- Coordinates: 43°0′19″N 88°13′26″W
- Area: 53 acres (21 ha)
- Built: 1859
- Architect: Hugo Hauser; Chris Holtz & Sons
- Architectural style: Greek Revival, Queen Anne, Victorian, Georgian Revival, Bungalow/Craftsman, Tudor Revival
- MPS: Waukesha MRA
- NRHP reference No.: 83004348

Significant dates
- Added to NRHP: December 1, 1983
- Boundary increase: March 29, 1993

The McCall Street Historic District in Waukesha, Wisconsin is a historic district that was first listed on the National Register of Historic Places in 1983. In 1983 it included 51 buildings deemed to contribute to the historic character of its 13-acre (5.3 ha) area. In 1993 the boundaries were increased to include a 40-acre (16 ha) area having 100 contributing buildings.

The district includes:

- The Bowron/Randles House (c. 1860), 403 McCall St, is a 2-story Greek Revival-styled building with limestone walls. Samuel A. Randle was a county judge and lawyer.
- The Henry Carl George Residence (c. 1862-63), 210 McCall St, is a stone house with the design and proportions of Greek Revival style, but not the typical cornice. Carl was a stonemason.
- The Randall house (1857/c. 1890), 120 McCall St., was once the home of Alexander Randall, former governor of Wisconsin.
- The A.S. Putney House (1878), 123 McCall St, is a 2-story house which has been added to eclectically over the years, combining asymmetric massing, steep gables, and bargeboards from Queen Anne style with a veranda inspired by Classical Revival style. Aaron Putney was a partner in his family's general merchandising company.
- The Charles and Hattie White house (c. 1878-80), 115 McCall St, is a frame house with Italianate-influenced styling and a 2-story bay.
- Walter L. Rankin House (1890), 303 N. East Avenue, built as home for Dr. Walter L. Rankin, president of Carroll College from 1866 to 1903
- James Glover House (c. 1892), 109 McCall St, is a 2-story Picturesque-style house with a carriage house behind. Glover was an engineer.
- The Robert S. Perkins House (c. 1897-98), 419 McCall St, is an early Colonial Revival-styled house, with Tuscan columns supporting its porch's entablature. Perkins was a dentist.
- The Lee Ovitt house (1901), 245 N. Hartwell, is a late Queen Anne-style house with corner tower, designed by Van Ryn & DeGelleke. Ovitt was an executive of the Silurian Mineral Spring Co. and manager of its casino.
- Harrie Randle House (1926), 233 N. Hartwell, Georgian Revival. Harrie ran a funeral parlor and furniture store with his father and was vice president of Waukesha Finance and Thrift.
