= First Congregational Church (Hartland, Wisconsin) =

Historic church in Wisconsin, United States

- U.S. National Register of Historic Places
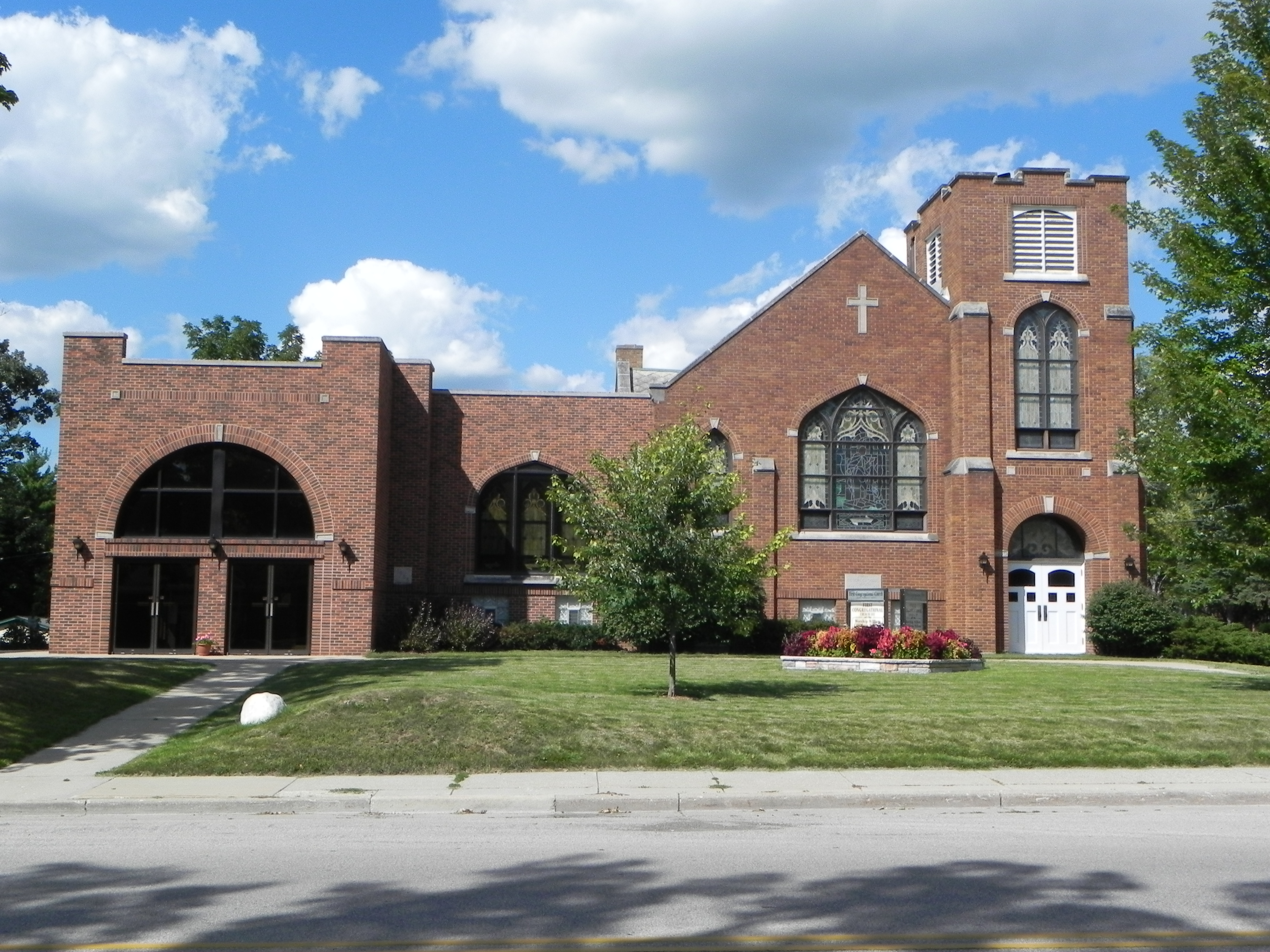

- Location within Wisconsin Location within the United States
- Location: 214 E. Capitol Dr., Hartland, Wisconsin
- Coordinates: 43°6′18″N 88°20′36″W
- Area: less than one acre
- Built: 1923
- Architect: Redden, William J.
- Architectural style: Late Gothic Revival, Other, Neogothic Revival
- MPS: Hartland MRA
- NRHP reference No.: 86003405
- Added to NRHP: December 8, 1986

First Congregational Church is located in Hartland, Wisconsin. The church was built in the Gothic Revival architecture style in 1923. It was added to the National Register of Historic Places on December 8, 1986, for its architectural significance.

The congregation was founded by 1842, meeting in Henry Cheney's barn. It built a church in 1847. The present church was built in 1923.

It was deemed to be one of two "fine local examples of the Gothic Revival style" in Hartland, with the Zion Evangelical Lutheran Church, also NRHP-listed as part of the same study. The Dansk Evangelical Lutheran Kirke was deemed to be a more unusual example of the style.
