= Albert Alden =

Albert Alden may refer to:

- Albert Alden (cyclist) (1887–1965), British cyclist
- Albert Alden (politician) (1813–1892), American politician
