= Albert Alden (politician) =

American politician (1813–1892)

Member of the Wisconsin State Assembly from the Waukesha 1st district
- In office January 2, 1860 – January 7, 1861
- Preceded by: Parker Sawyer
- Succeeded by: Daniel Cottrell
- In office January 4, 1858 – January 3, 1859
- Preceded by: James M. Lewis
- Succeeded by: Parker Sawyer

Member of the Wisconsin State Assembly from the Waukesha 3rd district
- In office January 1, 1849 – January 7, 1850
- Preceded by: Chauncey G. Heath
- Succeeded by: Pitts Ellis

Personal details
- Born: March 5, 1813 Portland, District of Maine, Massachusetts, U.S.
- Died: January 8, 1892 (aged 78) Delafield, Wisconsin, U.S.
- Resting place: Nashotah House Cemetery, Delafield, Wisconsin
- Party: Republican; Democratic (before 1854)
- Spouse: Caroline Alden (m. 1843)
- Children: Albert Alden Jr.^{(b. 1844; died 1924)}; Caroline Louisa Alden^{(b. 1853; died 1936)}

Albert Alden, Sr. (March 5, 1813 – January 8, 1892) was a farmer and merchant from Delafield, Wisconsin, who served three one-year terms in the Wisconsin State Assembly, one each in the 1840s, 1850s and 1860s.

== Background ==
Alden (a descendant of Mayflower passenger John Alden) was born in Portland, Maine, on March 5, 1811, and educated there. He went into the mercantile business, and in 1836, he went to New Orleans and worked as a clerk for a merchant there. In 1842 he moved to Wisconsin Territory and opened a general store in the village of Delafield (the first store in the Town of Delafield), which he ran until 1846. In December 1843, in Summit, he married Caroline Fairservice, a native of Oneida County, New York; they would go on to have four children. In 1844, he bought sixty acres of land straddling the Bark River from Milton Cushing (father of Alonzo, Howard, and William B. Cushing), and built a dam to create a millpond between Nagawicka Lake and Upper Nemahbin Lake to power a sawmill; the dam's removal (long after the mill was shut down) would become controversial in the early 21st century.

== Public offices ==
Alden became the first postmaster in Delafield; in 1846, he was elected as the first sheriff of the newly established Waukesha County. He was elected as a member of the Assembly for the 1849 session (2nd Wisconsin Legislature) as a Democrat representing the Towns of Delafield, Genesee and Pewaukee, succeeding fellow Democrat Dewey K. Warren. He left Wisconsin for California during the Gold Rush, and was succeeded in 1850 by another Democrat, Pitts Ellis. While in California, he was elected Assistant Clerk of the California State Assembly.

Having returned to Wisconsin after a couple of years in California, he became active in the new Republican Party which had been organized in Wisconsin. He was elected to the Assembly for the 1858 session as a Republican, succeeding fellow Republican James M. Lewis in the new 1st Waukesha County assembly district (Delafield, Oconomowoc and Summit); and was succeeded in 1859 by another Republican, Parker Sawyer. He returned to his old seat for a final time for the 13th Wisconsin Legislature of 1860, and was succeeded by Daniel Cottrell (yet again a Republican). Alden was again elected sheriff in 1864.

== Private affairs ==
Alden continued to farm his 360 acres on the shores of Nagawicka Lake. His wife Carolina died November 8, 1891, at their home in Delafield, and Alden himself died there less than two months later, on January 8, 1892.

Wisconsin State Assembly
Preceded by Chauncey G. Heath	Member of the Wisconsin State Assembly from the Waukesha 3rd district January 1, 1849 – January 7, 1850	Succeeded by Pitts Ellis
Preceded by James M. Lewis	Member of the Wisconsin State Assembly from the Waukesha 1st district January 4, 1858 – January 3, 1859	Succeeded by Parker Sawyer
Preceded by Parker Sawyer	Member of the Wisconsin State Assembly from the Waukesha 1st district January 2, 1860 – January 7, 1861	Succeeded by Daniel Cottrell
