= Joseph Bloodgood =

Joseph Bloodgood may refer to:

- Joseph Colt Bloodgood (1867–1935), American surgeon
- Joseph Wheeler Bloodgood (1926–1960), American judge and politician
