= Thomas A. Loftus =

American politician and diplomat

Tom Loftus
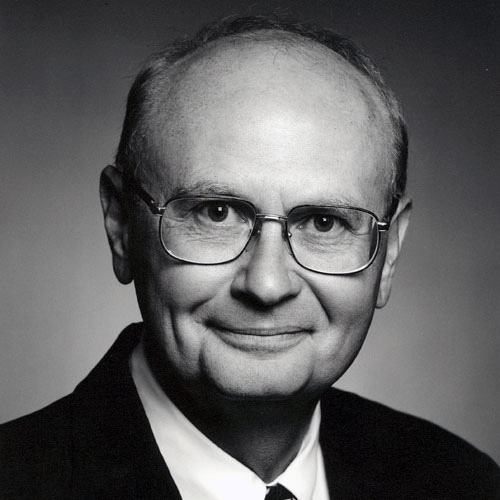

United States Ambassador to Norway
- In office November 18, 1993 – December 22, 1997
- President: Bill Clinton
- Preceded by: Loret Miller Ruppe
- Succeeded by: David B. Hermelin

70th Speaker of the Wisconsin State Assembly
- In office January 3, 1983 – January 7, 1991
- Preceded by: Edward Jackamonis
- Succeeded by: Walter Kunicki

Majority Leader of the Wisconsin State Assembly
- In office January 5, 1981 – January 3, 1983
- Preceded by: Gary K. Johnson
- Succeeded by: Gary K. Johnson

Member of the Wisconsin State Assembly
- In office January 7, 1985 – January 7, 1991
- Preceded by: Jim Holperin
- Succeeded by: Rudy Silbaugh
- Constituency: 46th district
- In office January 3, 1983 – January 7, 1985
- Preceded by: John M. Young
- Succeeded by: John M. Young
- Constituency: 99th district
- In office January 3, 1977 – January 3, 1983
- Preceded by: David D. O'Malley
- Succeeded by: Jim Holperin
- Constituency: 46th district

Personal details
- Born: Thomas A. Loftus; April 24, 1945 (age 81) Stoughton, Wisconsin, U.S.
- Party: Democratic
- Spouse: Barbara Carolyn Schasse (m. 1969)
- Children: 2
- Education: University of Wisconsin–Whitewater (B.S.); University of Wisconsin–Madison (M.P.P.A.)
- Awards: Royal Norwegian Order of Merit

Military service
- Allegiance: United States
- Branch/service: United States Army
- Years of service: 1965–1967
- Battles/wars: Vietnam War

Thomas Adolph Loftus (born April 24, 1945) is a retired American diplomat, educator, and Democratic politician from Dane County, Wisconsin. He was United States Ambassador to Norway from 1993 through 1997, during the presidency of Bill Clinton, served as an advisor and representative of the World Health Organization, and most recently was a member of the University of Wisconsin Board of Regents, retiring in 2011. He is also the author of the award-winning memoir, "Mission to Oslo: Dancing with the Queen, Dealmaking with the Russians, Shaping History" (Little Creek Press, 2024).

Prior to his diplomatic service, he was the 70th speaker of the Wisconsin State Assembly (1983–1991) at the culmination of a 14-year career in the Wisconsin Legislature, and was the Democratic nominee for Governor of Wisconsin in the 1990 election.

== Early life and education ==
Tom Loftus was born in Stoughton, Wisconsin, on April 24, 1945. He was raised and educated in Dane County, graduating from Sun Prairie High School in 1963. He served in the United States Army for two years in the midst of the Vietnam War before returning to his education in Wisconsin. He received his bachelor's degree from the University of Wisconsin–Whitewater in 1970, and immediately went on to complete his Master of Public Policy and Administration at the University of Wisconsin–Madison in 1971.

Loftus became involved in politics with the Democratic Party of Wisconsin from an early age, and went to work as a legislative aide in the Wisconsin State Assembly immediately after completing his education. For two years, he was an administrative aide to Assembly speaker Norman C. Anderson. In the spring of 1976, he worked as a campaign organizer for Mo Udall during his unsuccessful campaign for the Democratic nomination for the presidency.

== Assembly career ==
Later that year, incumbent state representative David D. O'Malley announced he would not run for another term in the Assembly, and Loftus decided to enter the race to succeed him. He faced three other candidates in the Democratic primary, but prevailed with nearly 47% of the vote. He defeated Republican Shirley Thompson in the general election. Loftus went on to win six more terms in the Assembly.

Loftus began looking to move into caucus leadership in his second term. He challenged R. Michael Ferrall for his role as assistant majority leader before the start of the 1979 session, but lost that election. Later in that term, Loftus made a bid for majority leader when James W. Wahner resigned, but he again fell short in the early rounds of the caucus vote. Loftus finally won a leadership position after the 1980 general election, defeating Thomas A. Hauke to become Assembly majority leader. Two years later, he was unanimously elected speaker.

He ultimately became the longest-serving Democratic speaker in Wisconsin history, serving four terms. Loftus frequently sparred with Republican governor Tommy Thompson after his election in 1986, and by the summer of 1989 the Wisconsin political press was already expecting Loftus to challenge Thompson in the 1990 gubernatorial election. Loftus did ultimately challenge Thompson in the election. He faced no opposition for the Democratic nomination but fell far short in the general election, receiving just 42% of the vote.

== Later years ==
After losing the gubernatorial election, Loftus took a short break from politics to teach, first spending a semester at the Harvard Institute of Politics, then spending a semester at the Eagleton Institute of Politics at Rutgers University.

Loftus returned to politics in early 1992, when he endorsed Bill Clinton in his presidential primary campaign, and then became chairman of Clinton's Wisconsin campaign organization. Shortly after Clinton won the presidency, Loftus was nominated to become United States Ambassador to Norway. His nomination was confirmed by the U.S. Senate on November 3, 1993.

Loftus served as ambassador for four years, stepping down in December 1997 to significant acclaim. Before leaving Norway, he was presented with the Grand Cross, the highest order of the Royal Norwegian Order of Merit, by King Harald V. He quickly accepted another diplomatic post, however, becoming a special advisor to the director-general of the World Health Organization in Geneva. He also became outspoken back in Wisconsin on diplomatic causes, advocating for the United States to support the admission of Poland and the Baltic states into the European Union.

After Clinton left office, Loftus became a representative of the World Health Organization in the United States. He remained active in state politics as a senior statesman, admonishing state government for recent ethical problems. He also reconciled with his former rival, Tommy Thompson, who was then serving as United States Secretary of Health and Human Services. During these years, Loftus endorsed a number of ethics reforms in the state and partnered with former Republican governor Lee S. Dreyfus in supporting the creation of WisconsinEye, a nonprofit cable network covering the state government. In 2005, Loftus was appointed to the University of Wisconsin Board of Regents by governor Jim Doyle, and later that year he became president of WisconsinEye. Loftus remained involved in WisconsinEye through its launch in 2007. He remained on the board of regents until 2011, when he retired.

Loftus still resides in Sun Prairie, Wisconsin, and has remained outspoken about international affairs, frequently writing a guest column in the Wisconsin State Journal and The Capital Times. After Tommy Thompson was chosen interim president of the University of Wisconsin System, in 2020, he selected Loftus as an advisor to help him prepare for the job.

== Personal life and family ==
Tom Loftus was one of four children born to Adolph Loftus and his wife Margaret Elaine (née Nielsen). Both parents were the children of immigrants, Adolph's parents had emigrated from Norway. Margaret's father had come from Denmark.

Tom Loftus married Barbara Carolyn Schasse on August 23, 1969. They had at least two children together.

== Electoral history ==
=== Wisconsin Assembly, 46th district (1976, 1978, 1980) ===
Year	Election	Date	Elected				Defeated				Total	Plurality
1976	Primary	Sep. 14	Thomas A. Loftus	Democratic	2,559	46.86%	Thomas L. Hebl	Dem.	1,472	26.95%	5,461	1,087
1976	Primary	Sep. 14	Thomas A. Loftus	Democratic	2,559	46.86%	Richard Keller	Dem.	865	15.84%	5,461	1,087
1976	Primary	Sep. 14	Thomas A. Loftus	Democratic	2,559	46.86%	James H. Bailey	Dem.	565	10.35%	5,461	1,087
1976	General	Nov. 2	Thomas A. Loftus	Democratic	13,293	55.74%	Shirley Thompson	Rep.	10,446	43.80%	23,847	2,847
1976	General	Nov. 2	Thomas A. Loftus	Democratic	13,293	55.74%	Edith O. Schreiber	Ind.	108	47.90%	23,847	2,847
1978	General	Nov. 7	Thomas A. Loftus (inc)	Democratic	10,309	60.26%	Wilbur D. Stites	Rep.	6,799	39.74%	17,108	3,510
1980	General	Nov. 4	Thomas A. Loftus (inc)	Democratic	14,815	56.03%	Mary D. Weisensel	Rep.	11,625	43.97%	26,440	3,190

=== Wisconsin Assembly, 99th district (1982) ===
Year	Election	Date	Elected				Defeated				Total	Plurality
1982	General	Nov. 2	Thomas A. Loftus	Democratic	9,354	62.43%	Jack V. Putney	Rep.	5,630	37.57%	14,984	3,724

=== Wisconsin Assembly, 46th district (1984, 1986, 1988) ===
Year	Election	Date	Elected				Defeated				Total	Plurality
1984	General	Nov. 6	Thomas A. Loftus	Democratic	13,160	62.62%	Danny E. Trotter	Rep.	7,857	37.38%	21,017	5,303
1986	General	Nov. 4	Thomas A. Loftus (inc)	Democratic	9,753	65.46%	Danny E. Trotter	Rep.	5,147	34.54%	14,900	4,606
1988	General	Nov. 8	Thomas A. Loftus (inc)	Democratic	14,759	69.28%	John H. Vegter	Rep.	6,545	30.72%	21,304	8,214

=== Wisconsin Governor (1990) ===
Wisconsin Gubernatorial Election, 1990
Party	Candidate	Votes	%	±%
General Election, November 6, 1990
Republican	Tommy Thompson (incumbent)	802,321	58.15%	+5.41pp
Democratic	Thomas A. Loftus	576,280	41.77%	−4.45pp
	Scattering	1,126	0.08%	
Plurality		226,041	16.38%	+9.86pp
Total votes		1,379,727	100.0%	-9.62%
Republican hold				

Party political offices
Preceded by Tony Earl	Democratic nominee for Governor of Wisconsin; 1990	Succeeded by Charles Chvala
Wisconsin State Assembly
Preceded by David D. O'Malley	Member of the Wisconsin State Assembly from the 46th district January 3, 1977 – January 3, 1983	Succeeded by James C. Holperin
Preceded by John M. Young	Member of the Wisconsin State Assembly from the 99th district January 3, 1983 – January 7, 1985	Succeeded by John Young
Preceded by James C. Holperin	Member of the Wisconsin State Assembly from the 46th district January 7, 1985 – January 7, 1991	Succeeded by Rudy Silbaugh
Preceded by Gary K. Johnson	Majority Leader of the Wisconsin State Assembly; January 5, 1981 – January 3, 1983	Succeeded by Gary K. Johnson
Preceded by Edward Jackamonis	Speaker of the Wisconsin State Assembly; January 3, 1983 – January 7, 1991	Succeeded by Walter Kunicki
Diplomatic posts
Preceded by Loret Miller Ruppe	United States Ambassador to Norway; November 18, 1993 – December 22, 1997	Succeeded by David B. Hermelin
