= Wisconsin's 99th Assembly district =

American legislative district in southeast Wisconsin

Wisconsin's 99th State Assembly district
- 2024 map defined in 2023 Wisc. Act 94; 2022 map defined in Johnson v. Wisconsin Elections Commission; 2011 map was defined in 2011 Wisc. Act 43
Assemblymember
Barbara Dittrich; R–Oconomowoc
since January 6, 2025 (1 years)
- Demographics: 93.5% White; 0.79% Black; 2.4% Hispanic; 1.45% Asian; 1.09% Native American; 0.11% Hawaiian/Pacific Islander
- Population (2020) • Voting age: 59,032; 45,709
- Website: Official website
- Notes: Southeast Wisconsin

The 99th Assembly district of Wisconsin is one of 99 districts in the Wisconsin State Assembly. Located in southeastern Wisconsin, the district comprises parts of northwest Waukesha County, northeast Jefferson County, and southeast Dodge County. It includes the cities of Oconomowoc and part of the city of Hartford, and the villages of Chenequa, Hartland, Lac La Belle, Nashotah, and Neosho. The district is represented by Republican Barbara Dittrich, since January 2025; Dittrich previously represented the 38th district from 2019 to 2025.

The 99th Assembly district is located within Wisconsin's 33rd Senate district, along with the 97th and 98th Assembly districts.

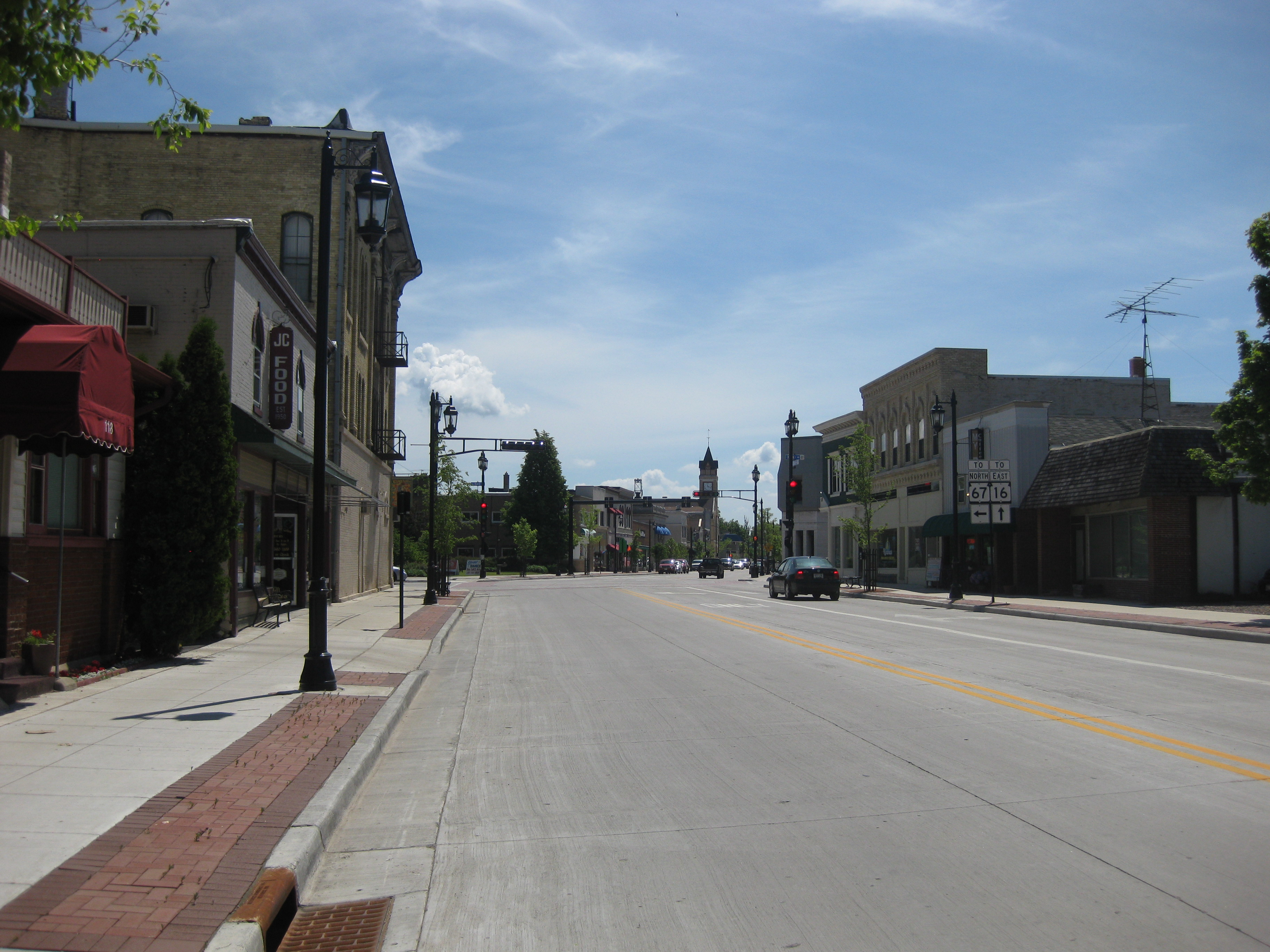
Downtown Oconomowoc

== List of past representatives ==
List of representatives to the Wisconsin State Assembly from the 99th district
Member	Party	Residence	Counties represented	Term start	Term end	Ref.
District created
Kenneth Merkel	Rep.	Brookfield	Waukesha	January 1, 1973	January 6, 1975	
Susan Engeleiter	Rep.	Brookfield	Waukesha	January 6, 1975	January 1, 1979	
John M. Young	Rep.	Brookfield	Waukesha	January 1, 1979	January 3, 1983	
Thomas A. Loftus	Dem.	Sun Prairie	Dane	January 3, 1983	January 7, 1985	
John M. Young	Rep.	Brookfield	Milwaukee, Waukesha	January 7, 1985	January 5, 1987	
Margaret Farrow	Rep.	Elm Grove	Milwaukee, Waukesha	January 5, 1987	January 2, 1989	
--Vacant--			Milwaukee, Waukesha	January 2, 1989	September 22, 1989	
Frank Urban	Rep.	Brookfield	Milwaukee, Waukesha	September 22, 1989	January 6, 2003	
Frank Urban	Rep.	Brookfield	Waukesha	September 22, 1989	January 6, 2003	
Michael A. Lehman	Rep.	Hartford	Dodge, Waukesha	January 6, 2003	January 3, 2005	
Don Pridemore	Rep.	Hartford	Dodge, Waukesha	January 3, 2005	January 7, 2013	
Chris Kapenga	Rep.	Delafield	Waukesha	January 7, 2013	August 6, 2015	
--Vacant--			Waukesha	August 6, 2015	October 9, 2015	
Cindi Duchow	Rep.	Delafield	Waukesha	October 9, 2015	January 6, 2025	
Cindi Duchow	Rep.	Delafield	Jefferson, Waukesha	October 9, 2015	January 6, 2025	
Barbara Dittrich	Rep.	Oconomowoc	Dodge, Jefferson, Waukesha	January 6, 2025	Current	
