= Stephen Warren House =

Historic house in Wisconsin, United States

- U.S. National Register of Historic Places
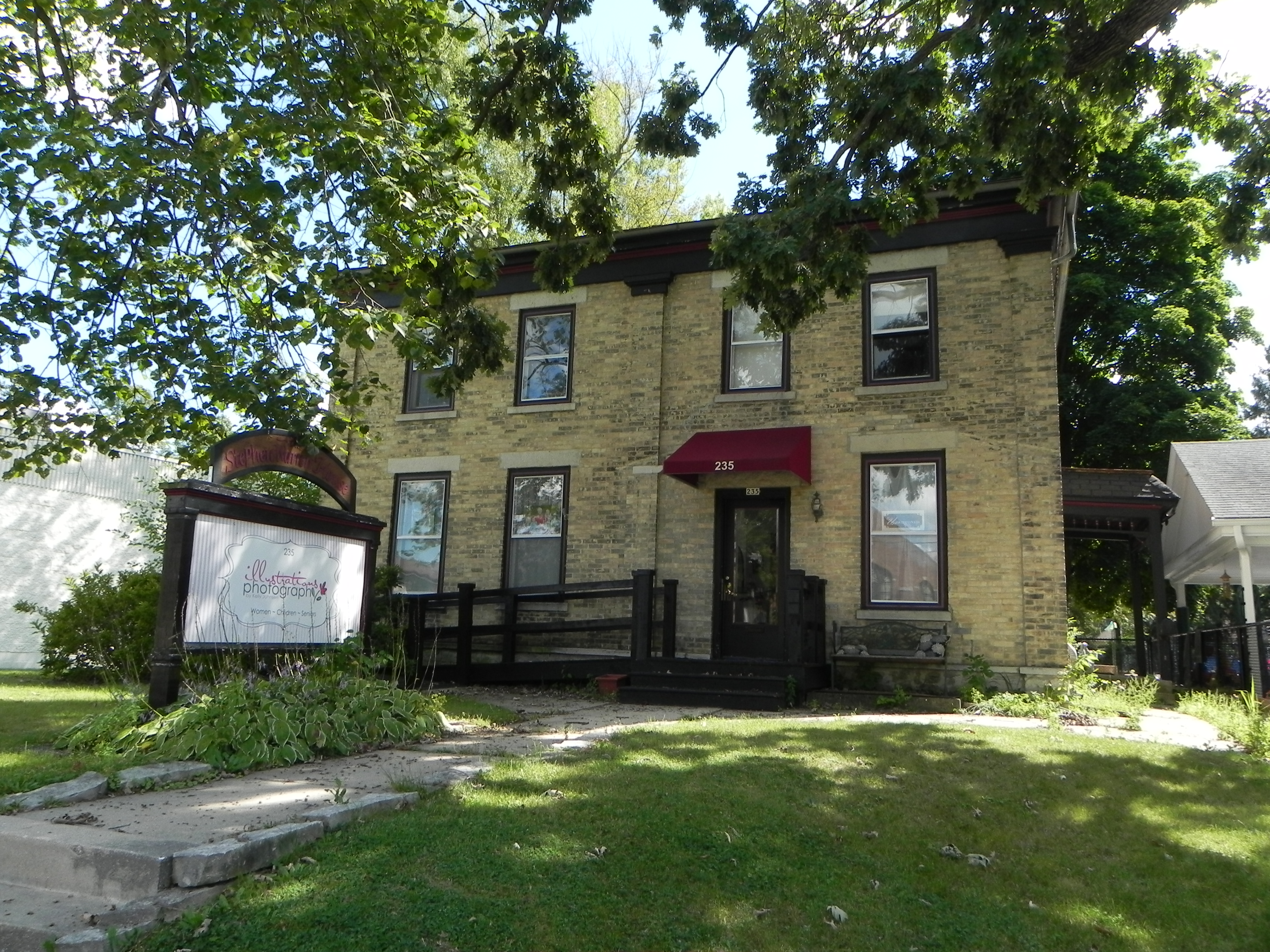
- Stephen Warren House
- Location: 235 E. Capitol Dr., Hartland, Wisconsin
- Coordinates: 43°06′16″N 88°20′36″W
- Area: less than one acre
- Built: 1855
- Architectural style: Greek Revival
- MPS: Hartland MRA
- NRHP reference No.: 86003432
- Added to NRHP: December 8, 1986

The Stephen Warren House is a historic house located in Hartland, Wisconsin.

It is a two-story cream brick house built in c.1855 upon a stone foundation for Stephen Warren, the first European-descent settler in Hartland. It has elements of Greek Revival, including brick pilasters supporting a wood entablature.

It was deemed "architecturally significant as a good local example of vernacular Greek Revival", potentially competing examples having been compromised, and as the "last tangible reminder of Hartland's founder".

== History ==
The house belongs to Stephen Warren. Both Stephen and his younger brother, Dewey, would become members of the Wisconsin State Assembly. The house was added to the National Register of Historic Places in 1986 and to the State Register of Historic Places in 1989.
