= Edward Jackamonis =

20th century American politician

69th Speaker of the Wisconsin State Assembly
- In office January 3, 1977 – January 3, 1983
- Preceded by: Norman C. Anderson
- Succeeded by: Thomas A. Loftus

Member of the Wisconsin State Assembly
- In office January 1, 1973 – January 3, 1983
- Preceded by: District established
- Succeeded by: Charles Chvala
- Constituency: 98th Assembly district
- In office January 4, 1971 – January 1, 1973
- Preceded by: Vincent R. Mathews
- Succeeded by: District abolished
- Constituency: Waukesha 3rd district

Personal details
- Born: Edward George Jackamonis Jr. October 19, 1939 New Britain, Connecticut, U.S.
- Died: January 22, 2006 (aged 66) Milwaukee, Wisconsin, U.S.
- Cause of death: Cancer
- Resting place: Prairie Home Cemetery, Waukesha, Wisconsin
- Party: Democratic
- Spouse: Barbara B. Bastenbeck (m. 1962–2006)
- Children: 2
- Education: Northeastern University; University of Wisconsin–Madison
- Occupation: Educator, politician

Edward George Jackamonis Jr. (October 19, 1939 – January 22, 2006) was an American educator and Democratic politician from Waukesha, Wisconsin. He was the 69th speaker of the Wisconsin State Assembly (1977–1983) and served 12 years in the Assembly, representing Wisconsin's 98th Assembly district from 1971 to 1983. He subsequently served as executive director of the Wisconsin Housing and Economic Development Authority from 1983 to 1988.

== Biography ==
Edward Jackamonis Jr. was born in New Britain, Connecticut, and raised in that city's Polish American community. He graduated from New Britain High School in 1957 and attended Northeastern University, where he obtained his bachelor's degree in political science in 1962.

Moving to Wisconsin, he received his master's degree from the University of Wisconsin–Madison and then taught at the University of Wisconsin–Waukesha. From 1971 to 1983, Jackamonis served as a Democratic member of the Wisconsin State Assembly, the last six years as speaker.

After leaving the Legislature, Jackamonis was appointed executive director of the Wisconsin Housing Finance Authority by Governor Tony Earl. He remained in that office until 1988, and during his term, the organization was converted into the Wisconsin Housing and Economic Development Authority. He then accepted a job in Albany, New York, as director of the New York State Assembly's program development group. He remained there for only three years, returning to Milwaukee in 1991. The remainder of his career was spent at various jobs in the city government of Milwaukee. He retired in 1999.

Jackamonis died of cancer on January 22, 2006.

== Personal life and family ==
Edward Jackamonis Jr. was the son of Edward Jackamonis and his wife Sophie (née Horosik). Both parents were first-generation Americans; his father's parents were Lithuanian immigrants, and his mother's parents were from Poland.

Edward Jr. married Barbara B. Bastenbeck on August 26, 1962. They met during their first year at Northeastern University. They were married for 43 years and had two children together before he died in 2006.

Wisconsin State Assembly
Preceded by Vincent R. Mathews	Member of the Wisconsin State Assembly from the Waukesha 3rd district January 4, 1971 – January 1, 1973	District abolished
District established by 1971 Wis. Act 304	Member of the Wisconsin State Assembly from the 98th district January 1, 1973 – January 3, 1983	Succeeded by Charles Chvala
Preceded by Norman C. Anderson	Speaker of the Wisconsin State Assembly; January 3, 1977 – January 3, 1983	Succeeded by Thomas A. Loftus
