= 2006 United States Senate election in Wisconsin =

- November 7, 2006
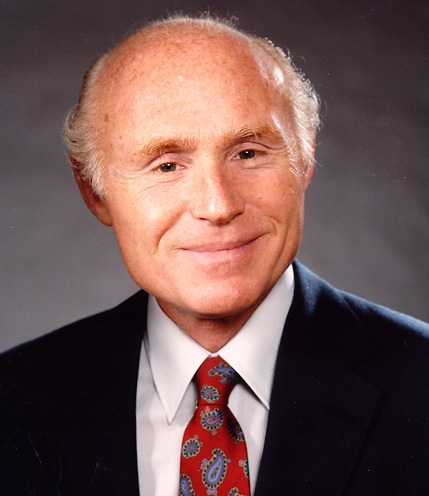

Nominee	Herb Kohl	Robert Lorge
Party	Democratic	Republican
Popular vote	1,439,214	630,299
Percentage	67.31%	29.48%
- Kohl: 40–50% 50–60% 60–70% 70–80% 80–90% >90% Lorge: 40–50% 50–60% 60–70% 70–80% Tie: 40–50% 50% No data
U.S. senator before election
Herb Kohl
Democratic
Elected U.S. Senator
Herb Kohl
Democratic

The 2006 United States Senate election in Wisconsin was held on November 7, 2006. Incumbent Democratic U.S. Senator Herb Kohl won re-election to his fourth and final term in a landslide. As of 2026, this is the most recent statewide election where any candidate won every county in Wisconsin.

== Democratic primary ==
=== Candidates ===
- Herb Kohl, incumbent U.S. senator
- Ben Masel

=== Results ===
Democratic primary results
Party	Candidate	Votes	%
Democratic	Herb Kohl (incumbent)	308,178	85.66%
Democratic	Ben Masel	51,245	14.24%
Democratic	Write ins	335	0.09%
Total votes		359,758	100%

== Republican primary ==
=== Candidates ===
- Robert Lorge, attorney

=== Results ===
Republican primary results
Party	Candidate	Votes	%
Republican	Robert Lorge	194,633	99.73%
Republican	Write ins	530	0.27%
Total votes		195,163	100%

== General election ==
=== Candidates ===
- Herbert Kohl (D), incumbent U.S. senator
- Robert Lorge (R), attorney
- Rae Vogeler (G), community organizer

=== Predictions ===
Source	Ranking	As of
The Cook Political Report	Solid D	November 6, 2006
Sabato's Crystal Ball	Safe D	November 6, 2006
Rothenberg Political Report	Safe D	November 6, 2006
Real Clear Politics	Safe D	November 6, 2006

=== Polling ===
Source	Date	Herb Kohl (D)	Robert Lorge (R)
Strategic Vision (R)	March 8, 2006	59%	27%
Strategic Vision (R)	April 12, 2006	61%	25%
Strategic Vision (R)	May 3, 2006	63%	25%
Strategic Vision (R)	June 8, 2006	65%	25%
University of Wisconsin	July 5, 2006	63%	14%
Rasmussen	July 20, 2006	60%	27%
Rasmussen	August 20, 2006	59%	31%
Zogby/WSJ	August 28, 2006	51%	33%
Zogby/WSJ	September 11, 2006	50%	35%
Rasmussen	September 25, 2006	60%	33%
Rasmussen	October 29, 2006	64%	25%
University of Wisconsin	October 30, 2006	73%	16%

=== Results ===
2006 United States Senate election, Wisconsin
Party	Candidate	Votes	%	±%
Democratic	Herb Kohl (incumbent)	1,439,214	67.31%	+5.8%
Republican	Robert Lorge	630,299	29.48%	−7.5%
Green	Rae Vogeler	42,434	1.98%	n/a
Independent	Ben Glatzel	25,096	1.17%	n/a
Other	Scattered	1,254	0.06%	n/a
Majority		808,915	37.83%	
Turnout		2,138,297	50.86%	
Democratic hold				

==== Counties that flipped Republican to Democratic ====
- Calumet (largest city: Chilton)
- Outagamie (largest city: Appleton)
- Waupaca (largest city: New London)
- Waushara (largest city: Berlin)
- Green Lake (largest city: Green Lake)
- Ozaukee (largest city: Mequon)
- Washington (largest city: West Bend)
- Waukesha (largest city: Waukesha)

== Analysis ==
Kohl won every county in the state. Kohl's weakest performance in the state was suburban Washington County, Wisconsin, which he won with just 49.6%. Kohl's strongest performance was in rural Menominee County, where he won with over 90% of the vote. Vogeler's best performance was in Dane County, where she came in third place with over 5%, a county where Lorge had his second weakest performance.

== See also ==
- 2006 United States Senate elections
- 2006 Wisconsin gubernatorial election
