= 1988 United States Senate election in Wisconsin =

- November 8, 1988
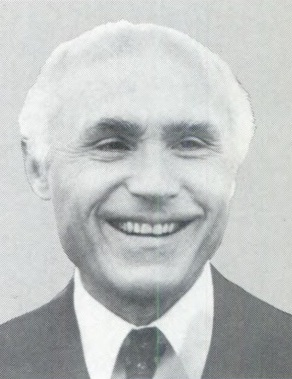

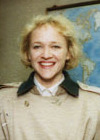
Nominee	Herb Kohl	Susan Engeleiter
Party	Democratic	Republican
Popular vote	1,128,625	1,030,440
Percentage	52.08%	47.55%
- County results Kohl: 50–60% 60–70% 70–80% Engeleiter: 40–50% 50–60% 60–70%
U.S. senator before election
William Proxmire
Democratic
Elected U.S. Senator
Herb Kohl
Democratic

The 1988 United States Senate election in Wisconsin took place on November 8, 1988. Incumbent Democratic U.S. Senator William Proxmire decided to retire, instead of running for re-election to a sixth full term. Democrat Herb Kohl won the open seat.

== Democratic primary ==
=== Candidates ===
- Tony Earl, former Governor of Wisconsin
- Ed Garvey, former executive director of the National Football League Players Association and nominee for Senate in 1986
- Edmond C. Hou-Seye
- Herb Kohl, businessman & former chairman of the Democratic Party of Wisconsin
- Doug La Follette, Secretary of State of Wisconsin

=== Results ===
Primary results by county: Kohl: 40–50%; 50–60%; 60–70%; Earl: 40–50%; 50–60%; 60–70%

Democratic primary results
Party	Candidate	Votes	%
Democratic	Herb Kohl	249,226	46.76%
Democratic	Tony Earl	203,479	38.18%
Democratic	Ed Garvey	55,225	10.36%
Democratic	Doug La Follette	19,819	3.72%
Democratic	Edmond C. Hou-Seye	5,040	0.95%
Democratic	Write ins	215	0.04%
Total votes		533,004	100%

== Republican primary ==
=== Candidates ===
- Susan Engeleiter, State Senator from Brookfield
- Steve King, chair of the Republican Party of Wisconsin
- Peter Y. Taylor

=== Results ===
Republican primary results
Party	Candidate	Votes	%
Republican	Susan Engeleiter	209,025	57.45%
Republican	Steve King	148,601	40.84%
Republican	Peter Y. Taylor	6,149	1.69%
Republican	Write ins	87	0.02%
Total votes		363,862	100%

== Results ==
=== Post-primary endorsements ===
Susan Engeleiter (R)

Newspapers

- La Crosse Tribune
- The Oshkosh Northwestern
Herb Kohl (D)

Newspapers

- The Daily Register
- The Journal Times
- Leader-Telegram
- The Reporter
- The Waukesha County Freeman

General election results
Party	Candidate	Votes	%
Democratic	Herb Kohl	1,128,625	52.08%
Republican	Susan Engeleiter	1,030,440	47.55%
Independent	George W. Zaehringer	3,965	0.18%
Socialist Workers	Patricia Grogan	3,029	0.14%
Independent	Arlyn F. Wollenburg	1,198	0.06%
Democratic hold			
Total votes		2,167,257	100.00%

== See also ==
- 1988 United States Senate elections
