= Norman C. Anderson =

American politician (1928–2020)

68th Speaker of the Wisconsin State Assembly
- In office December 17, 1971 – January 3, 1977
- Preceded by: Robert T. Huber
- Succeeded by: Edward Jackamonis

Majority Leader of the Wisconsin State Assembly
- In office January 4, 1971 – December 17, 1971
- Preceded by: Paul Alfonsi
- Succeeded by: Tony Earl

Member of the Wisconsin State Assembly
- In office January 1, 1973 – January 3, 1977
- Preceded by: District established
- Succeeded by: Peter D. Bear
- Constituency: 37th district
- In office January 2, 1961 – January 1, 1973
- Preceded by: Glenn L. Henry
- Succeeded by: District abolished
- Constituency: Dane 1st district
- In office January 7, 1957 – January 5, 1959
- Preceded by: Joseph Wheeler Bloodgood
- Succeeded by: Glenn L. Henry
- Constituency: Dane 1st district

Chief Clerk of the Wisconsin State Assembly
- In office January 5, 1959 – January 2, 1961
- Preceded by: Arthur L. May
- Succeeded by: Robert G. Marotz

Personal details
- Born: March 11, 1928 Hammond, Indiana, U.S.
- Died: June 27, 2020 (aged 92) Madison, Wisconsin, U.S.
- Party: Democratic
- Spouses: Eleanor Shefferman (m. 1954; died 1994); Peggy Powers (m. 1998–2020)
- Children: 4 with Eleanor Shefferman & 3 stepchildren
- Education: University of Wisconsin–Madison (B.S.); University of Wisconsin Law School (LL.B.)
- Profession: Lawyer

Military service
- Allegiance: United States
- Branch/service: United States Army
- Years of service: 1946–1947

Norman C. Anderson (March 11, 1928 – June 27, 2020) was a Swedish American lawyer and Democratic politician from Madison, Wisconsin. He was the 68th speaker of the Wisconsin State Assembly and served a total of 18 years in the Assembly, representing northeast Madison and neighboring suburbs. He also served as chief clerk of the Assembly during the 1959 session.

== Early life and education ==
Norman Anderson was born on March 11, 1928, in Hammond, Indiana. He was raised and educated in Indiana, but spent several summers of his childhood in Wisconsin. After graduating from high school in 1945, he enlisted in the United States Army and served in the Panama Canal Zone. After leaving the Army, he moved to Madison, Wisconsin, to continue his education, earning a B.S. in political science from the University of Wisconsin–Madison in 1951 and earning his LL.B. from the University of Wisconsin Law School in 1954.

While attending the University of Wisconsin, he worked on the staff of The Daily Cardinal student newspaper, where he met his first wife. While in law school, he was appointed to serve as acting coroner by the incumbent Dane County coroner, Joseph Wheeler Bloodgood—a law school colleague—while he was serving in the United States Navy. Anderson ultimately served in the role for all of 1953 and part of 1954.

== Political career ==
After graduating from law school, Anderson worked briefly as an attorney in private practice while also continuing to serve as a deputy coroner. In 1956, Joseph Wheeler Bloodgood, who by then had become a state representative, announced he was leaving that office to run for district attorney. Anderson announced he would run to succeed Bloodgood in the Wisconsin State Assembly. Anderson faced no opposition in the Democratic primary and went on to defeat Republican Donald Scheak with 66% of the vote in the general election.

After one term, Anderson faced a primary challenge from former assistant district attorney and former Madison alderman Glenn L. Henry, and was narrowly defeated in the 1958 Democratic primary. Madison newspapers at the time suggested that Anderson had not taken the primary seriously and had not engaged in a vigorous campaign.

Although Anderson lost his seat, the Democrats gained the majority in the State Assembly for the first time in 26 years. At the organization of the new Democratic majority, they elected Anderson to serve as chief clerk of the Assembly in the new term. During this time, he also became a partner in a law firm with state senator Horace W. Wilkie.

In the spring of 1960, Glenn Henry announced he would not run for re-election to the Assembly. A day later, Anderson announced he would run to reclaim the seat. He defeated Pete Schmidt in the Democratic primary and faced no opposition in the general election. After returning to office in 1961, Anderson would go on to win seven more terms. He was elected assistant majority leader in 1965, and became majority leader at the start of the 1971 session. In December 1971, Assembly speaker Robert T. Huber resigned in order to accept a seat on the highway commission, and Anderson was elected to fill out the remainder of the term, becoming the 68th speaker of the Wisconsin State Assembly. Anderson's victory in the speaker's election, defeating speaker pro tempore Joseph Sweda, was described as a victory of the ascendant liberal intellectual caucus over more conservative rural and labor Democrats. Anderson went on to win two more terms as speaker for the 1973–1974 and 1975–1976 sessions.

Anderson's political career came to an end largely because of his defense of members of his caucus on the state's budget-writing Joint Finance Committee who held a private meeting when preparing their plan for the 1975–1976 state budget—an apparent violation of the state's open meetings laws. Anderson spent much of 1976 fighting with the press and his primary opponent about this one issue. He ultimately lost the primary by 78 votes.

Anderson devoted much of the rest of his working years to his legal career, but he sometimes acted as a lobbyist and served several years as a member of Madison's police and fire commission and the Madison Redevelopment Authority. Anderson was mentioned as a potential judicial appointee several times, but never served in that capacity. He was a co-founder of the Dane County Natural Heritage Foundation—now Groundswell Conservancy—a nonprofit which works to preserve natural spaces in Madison and south central Wisconsin.

== Personal life and family ==
Norman Anderson was a first generation American born to Swedish American immigrants Carl and Alma Anderson.

Norman Anderson married twice. His first wife was Eleanor Shefferman, of Washington, D.C., who he met while they were both working for The Daily Cardinal at the University of Wisconsin. She also worked briefly for the Wisconsin State Journal. They married on the last day of 1954 and went on to have four children together. They were married nearly 50 years before Eleanor's death in 1994. Four years later, Norman married Peggy Powers, and they lived together until his death in 2020.

Wisconsin State Assembly
Preceded by Joseph Wheeler Bloodgood	Member of the Wisconsin State Assembly from the Dane 1st district January 7, 1957 – January 5, 1959	Succeeded by Glenn L. Henry
Preceded by Arthur L. May	Chief Clerk of the Wisconsin State Assembly; January 5, 1959 – January 2, 1961	Succeeded by Robert G. Marotz
Preceded by Glenn L. Henry	Member of the Wisconsin State Assembly from the Dane 1st district January 2, 1961 – January 1, 1973	District abolished
District established by 1971 Wis. Act 304	Member of the Wisconsin State Assembly from the 37th district January 1, 1973 – January 3, 1977	Succeeded by Peter D. Bear
Preceded by Paul Alfonsi	Majority Leader of the Wisconsin State Assembly; January 4, 1971 – December 17, 1971	Succeeded by Tony Earl
Preceded by Robert T. Huber	Speaker of the Wisconsin State Assembly; December 17, 1971 – January 3, 1977	Succeeded by Edward Jackamonis
