= Susan Engeleiter =

American politician

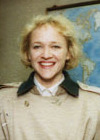

16th Administrator of the Small Business Administration
- In office May 1, 1989 – May 1, 1991
- President: George H. W. Bush
- Preceded by: James Abdnor
- Succeeded by: Pat Saiki

Minority Leader of the Wisconsin Senate
- In office January 7, 1985 – January 2, 1989
- Preceded by: James Harsdorf
- Succeeded by: Michael G. Ellis

Member of the Wisconsin Senate from the 33rd district
- In office May 6, 1980 – April 20, 1989
- Preceded by: Roger Murphy
- Succeeded by: Margaret Farrow

Member of the Wisconsin State Assembly from the 99th district
- In office January 1975 – January 1979
- Preceded by: Kenneth Merkel
- Succeeded by: John M. Young

Personal details
- Born: March 18, 1952 (age 74) Brookfield, Wisconsin, U.S.
- Party: Republican
- Children: 3
- Education: University of Wisconsin–Madison (BA, JD)

Susan Shannon Engeleiter (née Susan Jane Shannon; born March 18, 1952) is an American Republican politician, lawyer, and businesswoman who served as the first female administrator of the U.S. Small Business Administration. She previously served nine years in the Wisconsin Senate and four years in the Wisconsin State Assembly, representing Waukesha County.

== Early life and education ==
Engeleiter was born in Brookfield, Wisconsin to Helen "Jo" Hildebrandt Shannon and Arthur W. Shannon, a Republican fundraiser and later the treasurer of the Republican Party of Wisconsin. She graduated from Brookfield Central High School in 1970. She graduated from the University of Wisconsin–Madison in 1974 and received a juris doctor from the University of Wisconsin Law School in 1981. In 1976, she married Gerald Engeleiter. The couple later divorced.

== Political career ==
Engeleiter was elected to the 99th district of Wisconsin Assembly in 1974. At age 22, she was the youngest woman to ever be elected to the Wisconsin Legislature. She served in the Assembly until January 1979, having decided against running for re-election in 1978 and instead, sought the congressional seat being vacated by Bob Kasten, who decided to run for Wisconsin governor. Engeleiter lost the primary to then-State Senator Jim Sensenbrenner by 589 votes. In April 1980, Engeleiter was elected in a special election to the Wisconsin State Senate. There she served as Assistant Minority Leader from 1982 to 1984, and as Minority Leader from 1984 to 1989. She was the first woman to serve as Minority Leader.

=== 1988 U.S. Senate campaign ===
Engeleiter ran for the U.S. Senate seat being vacated by William Proxmire in 1988. In the primary election, she defeated state GOP chairman Steve King. King had labeled Engeleiter a moderate, while touting his conservative credentials. Engeleiter faced Democrat Herb Kohl, former chairman of the state Democratic Party, in the November general election. On November 2, 1988, as polls showed Engeleiter and Kohl running neck-to-neck, President Ronald Reagan visited Milwaukee to headline a campaign rally and fundraiser for Engeleiter. Engeleiter lost the race to Kohl, by a 52% to 48% margin.

== Business career ==
In January 1989, President George H. W. Bush nominated Engeleiter to be the Administrator of the Small Business Administration. She was confirmed by the U.S. Senate and served in that position until 1991, the first woman to hold the position. During her term as administrator, Engeleiter was also appointed chairwoman of the National Women's Business Council. From 1991 to 1996 she also served on the President's Export Council.

After leaving the SBA, Engeleiter served as vice-president of Government Affairs at Honeywell from 1992 to 1998. At Honeywell, she handled legislative and regulatory efforts in energy, environmental, and procurement areas. She represented Honeywell on several industry association boards and on United States government agency advisory boards.

Engeleiter has been President of Data Recognition Corporation since 1998 and the company's CEO since 2006. She also serves on the board of the Children's Theater Company, Wisconsin Alumni Association, Hazelden Betty Ford Foundation.

== Electoral history ==
Wisconsin U.S. Senate Election 1988
Party	Candidate	Votes	%	±%
Democratic	Herb Kohl	1,128,625	52.08	
Republican	Susan Engeleiter	1,030,440	47.55	

Wisconsin U.S. Senate Election 1988 - Republican Primary
Party	Candidate	Votes	%	±%
Republican	Susan Engeleiter	209,025	57.45	
Republican	Steve King	148,601	40.84	

Wisconsin 9th Congressional District Election 1978 - Republican Primary
Party	Candidate	Votes	%	±%
Republican	Jim Sensenbrenner	29,584	43.30	
Republican	Susan Engeleiter	28,995	42.44	
Republican	Robert C. Brunner	9,746	14.26	

Wisconsin State Assembly
Preceded by Kenneth Merkel	Member of the Wisconsin State Assembly from the 99th district 1975–1979	Succeeded by John M. Young
Wisconsin Senate
Preceded by Roger Murphy	Member of the Wisconsin Senate from the 33rd district 1980–1989	Succeeded by Margaret Farrow
Preceded by James Harsdorf	Minority Leader of the Wisconsin Senate; 1985–1989	Succeeded by Michael G. Ellis
Party political offices
Preceded by Scott McCallum	Republican nominee for U.S. Senator from Wisconsin (Class 1); 1988	Succeeded by Robert Welch
Political offices
Preceded by James Abdnor	Administrator of the Small Business Administration; 1989–1991	Succeeded by Paul Cooksey; Acting
