= Stephen Warren (politician) =

Canadian-American politician

Stephen Warren (November 3, 1815 – February 28, 1898) was a member of the Wisconsin State Assembly.

== Biography ==
Warren was born on November 3, 1815, in Hawkesbury, Ontario. On May 7, 1840, he married Mary Y. Nicholson in Hartland, Wisconsin. They had two children before her death in 1891. Warren died in Hartland on February 28, 1898, and was buried there.

His brother, Dewey, was also a member of the Assembly. His former home, now known as the Stephen Warren House, is listed on the National Register of Historic Places.

== Career ==
Warren was a member of the Assembly during the 1855 session. He was a Republican.
