= Trapp Filling Station =

- U.S. National Register of Historic Places
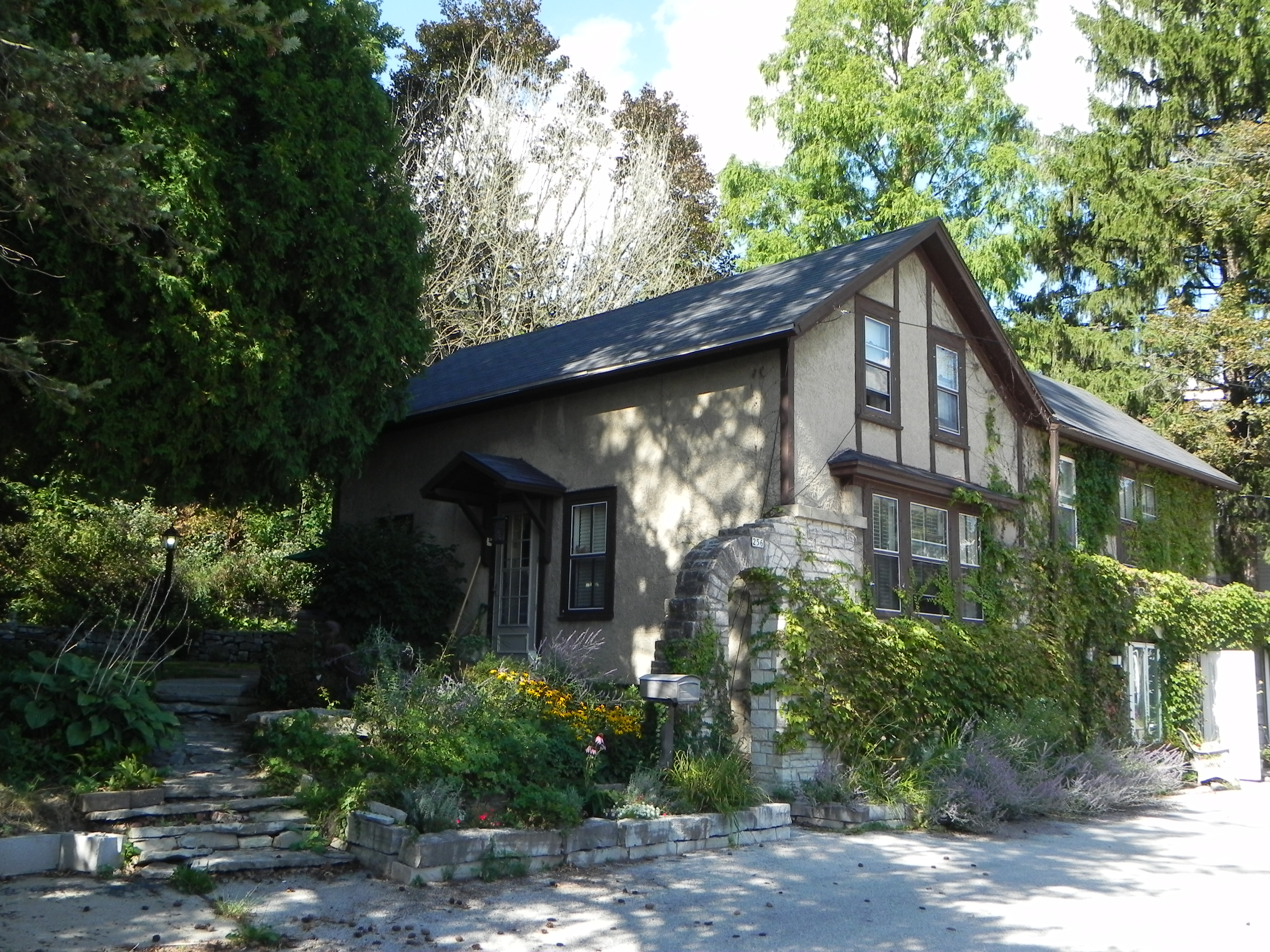

- Location within Wisconsin
- Location: 252--256 W. Capitol Dr., Hartland, Wisconsin
- Coordinates: 43°06′11″N 88°21′03″W
- Area: less than one acre
- Built: 1922
- Architectural style: Tudor Revival
- MPS: Hartland MRA
- NRHP reference No.: 86003419
- Added to NRHP: December 8, 1986

The Trapp Filling Station, at 252-256 W. Capitol Drive in Hartland, Wisconsin, was built in 1922. It was listed on the National Register of Historic Places in 1986.

Originally, the structure was built and used as a house. It was located on the major highway into Hartland, though, and in the 1920s Cornelius Trapp began to operate it as a filling station. Apparently "its location was obviously not prominent enough to succeed in sales. The site was soon used by others, twice as a grocery store by the Elmer Hornburg family and the Ferdi Dombroski family. More recently it has seen use as a handcraft outlet store and a health food market. Members of the Trapp family remained residents of the upper residential areas even when changing commercial agents operated out of the lower area."
