= Joseph Wheeler Bloodgood =

American politician (1926–1960)

Judge of the Superior Court of Dane County, Wisconsin, Branch 2
- In office May 1, 1960 – July 7, 1960 (died)
- Preceded by: Position established
- Succeeded by: Ervin M. Bruner

District Attorney of Dane County, Wisconsin
- In office January 1, 1957 – May 1, 1960
- Preceded by: John D. Winner
- Succeeded by: William D. Byrne

Member of the Wisconsin State Assembly from the Dane 1st district
- In office January 3, 1955 – January 7, 1957
- Preceded by: Floyd E. Wheeler
- Succeeded by: Norman C. Anderson

Coroner of Dane County, Wisconsin
- In office January 1, 1951 – January 3, 1955
- Preceded by: David C. Atwood
- Succeeded by: Stanley C. Larsen

Personal details
- Born: May 15, 1926 Madison, Wisconsin, U.S.
- Died: July 7, 1960 (aged 34) Madison, Wisconsin, U.S.
- Cause of death: Suicide
- Resting place: Nashotah House Cemetery, Summit, Waukesha County, Wisconsin
- Party: Democratic
- Spouse: Mary Elizabeth Peck (m. 1948–1960)
- Children: 7
- Relatives: Stanley Matthews (great-grandfather)
- Education: University of Wisconsin (B.A., LL.B.)
- Profession: Lawyer, politician

Military service
- Allegiance: United States
- Branch/service: United States Navy Reserve
- Years of service: 1943–1946; 1952–1954
- Rank: Lieutenant, USNR
- Unit: USS Andromeda (AKA-15)
- Battles/wars: World War II; Korean War

Joseph Wheeler Bloodgood (May 15, 1926 – July 7, 1960) was an American lawyer and Democratic politician from Madison, Wisconsin. He served one term in the Wisconsin State Assembly, representing Madison in the 1955 term. After serving in the Assembly, he served three years as district attorney of Dane County, Wisconsin, and served three months as a Dane County Superior Court judge before taking his own life in 1960. Earlier in his career, he had been coroner of Dane County.

== Early life ==
Joseph Wheeler Bloodgood was born in Madison, Wisconsin, in 1926. He was raised and educated in Madison, graduating from University of Wisconsin High School in 1943. As the country was at that time in the midst of World War II, immediately after graduating high school, Bloodgood enrolled in the Naval Reserve Officers Training Corps program at Northwestern University.

He was commissioned an ensign in the United States Navy Reserve in August 1945, at New York City. Though the war ended that same month, Bloodgood remained on active duty for another year. During 1946, he was assigned to Bikini Atoll to assist with the logistics of the American nuclear tests taking place there. At Bikini, he was assigned to extinguish flames and test radio activity after bomb detonations, likely resulting in significant radiation exposure. He was discharged in August 1946 and returned to Madison.

After returning to Wisconsin, Bloodgood enrolled in the University of Wisconsin and earned his bachelor's degree in 1948. He briefly pursued a graduate course at the Princeton School of Public and International Affairs. In the Summer of 1949, he accepted a fellowship in Washington, D.C., and did not return to Princeton. Instead he was hired by the United States Census Bureau and assigned to a technical job supporting the 1950 census in Madison.

== Political career ==
In 1950, Bloodgood made his first bid for elected office, running for coroner of Dane County, Wisconsin, on the Democratic Party ticket. He faced a primary against former police investigator Charles C. Haradon, but prevailed by a wide margin. In the general election, Bloodgood challenged the incumbent Dr. David C. Atwood, a close family friend. Bloodgood won the election with 52% of the vote. While running for coroner, Bloodgood also began attending law school at the University of Wisconsin.

In the fall of 1951, during his first year as coroner, Bloodgood was recalled to active duty with the Navy due to the Korean War; he was promoted to the rank of lieutenant junior grade and later lieutenant. An opinion by the district attorney, Richard W. Bardwell, concluded that Bloodgood would not be compelled to resign due to his military service. He reported for duty in March 1952 and then deployed to the Pacific as a legal officer aboard the USS Andromeda (AKA-15). The Andromeda was a combat cargo ship and traveled extensively around the western Pacific during his 22 months of service. While deployed, he was re-elected in November 1952 to another two-year term as coroner.

Bloodgood was discharged from the Navy in January 1954 and resumed his duties in Madison. He completed his legal studies later that year and earned his LL.B. from the University of Wisconsin. He announced in April that he would not run for re-election as coroner, a month later he announced that he would run for Wisconsin State Assembly in the newly redrawn Dane County 1st Assembly district. Wisconsin had undergone a major legislative redistricting in 1953 after 30 years without any serious redistricting legislation; Dane County had gained two Assembly districts, and the new Dane County 1st district comprised just the east side of the city of Madison. No incumbent state representative resided in the new district. In the Democratic Party primary, Bloodgood was opposed by Madison city councilmember Chris J. Mohr; Bloodgood won the primary with 58% of the vote. Bloodgood went on to win the general election by a wide margin, receiving 70% of the vote against businessman Donald Scheak . During his term in the Legislature, Bloodgood was assigned to the Assembly highways committee and pushed for a bill to require seat belts in cars, but the bill failed on the floor of the Assembly.

In the Spring of 1956, Bloodgood announced he would run for district attorney of Dane County after the previous elected district attorney was elevated to Wisconsin circuit court judge. Governor Walter J. Kohler Jr. appointed John D. Winner to hold the office until the next election, and Winner entered the race as a Republican candidate. The assistant district attorney, William D. Byrne, also sought the office as a Democrat and challenged Bloodgood in an extremely competitive primary; Bloodgood prevailed by just 545 votes. Despite having never tried a civil or criminal case in his legal career, Bloodgood went on to win the general election.

He won re-election by a wide margin in 1958, defeating Madison attorney Roger Radue.

In 1959, the Wisconsin Legislature voted to create a new branch of the Dane County Superior Court, to consolidate the county's family court cases. Bloodgood announced in September 1959 that he would run for the new judicial post in the spring 1960 election. Five others also ran. Bloodgood survived the nonpartisan primary, but seemed to be a serious underdog to city councilmember William Charles Sachtjen, who had received a nearly twice as many votes as Bloodgood in the nonpartisan primary, carried every precinct in the city of Madison, and seemed to have broad support in the county. Sachtjen's chances further improved as he picked up the endorsement of defeated third-place finisher, attorney James C. Geisler. Bloodgood, however, received the support of fourth-place finisher Wayne W. Martin and the endorsement of the influential Madison newspaper, the Wisconsin State Journal. The election coincided with Wisconsin's presidential preference primary, a hotly contested race between John F. Kennedy and Hubert Humphrey, which resulted in increased turnout. Bloodgood prevailed in the general election by about 1,400 votes out of 59,000 cast.

== Death ==
Bloodgood took office as judge on May 1, 1960, and served for just over two weeks in the job before suffering a breakdown while overseeing a juvenile delinquency hearing. He was admitted to Madison Hospital on May 17 and diagnosed with severe mental depression and complete nervous exhaustion. After a month in hospital, Bloodgood was released on June 23, to accompany his wife and seven children on a vacation to St. Joseph Island, Ontario. After about a week away, he and his wife chartered a flight back from Madison so that he could be re-admitted to the hospital. Bloodgood confided in his friend and attorney, Norman C. Anderson, that he feared he would be confined indefinitely in the hospital. On the evening of July 7, 1960, Bloodgood went to the hospital showers and hung himself; he was 34.

== Personal life and family ==
Joseph Wheeler Bloodgood was the second of four children born to Reverends Francis Joseph Bloodgood and his wife Jane Gray (née Cleveland) Bloodgood. Both parents were Episcopal ministers with doctorate degrees. Francis Bloodgood served in World War I with the 32nd U.S. Infantry Division. Jane Cleveland Bloodgood was the first woman admitted to Sewanee: The University of the South and the first woman to be ordained a priest in the Episcopalian Diocese of Oklahoma. Both parents worked for the Christian Foundation for the Holy Land in the Mandate for Palestine for about a year after World War II.

Joseph Wheeler Bloodgood married Mary Elizabeth Peck, of Milwaukee, in December 1948. They had seven children together in 12 years of marriage before his death in 1960.

In addition to his political pursuits, Bloodgood was a musician, performing as a vocal tenor at various local functions throughout his life. He played piano and oboe and wrote an operetta when he was twelve years old.

== Electoral history ==
=== Dane County Coroner (1950, 1952) ===
Year	Election	Date	Elected				Defeated				Total	Plurality
1950	Primary	Sep. 19	Joseph W. Bloodgood	Democratic	9,006	64.51%	Charles C. Haradon	Dem.	4,953	35.48%	13,960	4,053
1950	General	Nov. 7	Joseph W. Bloodgood	Democratic	29,101	52.26%	David C. Atwood (inc)	Rep.	26,588	47.74%	55,689	2,513
1952	General	Nov. 4	Joseph W. Bloodgood (inc)	Democratic	40,313	52.52%	Joseph C. Steinauer	Rep.	36,448	47.48%	76,761	3,865

=== Wisconsin Assembly (1954) ===
Year	Election	Date	Elected				Defeated				Total	Plurality
1954	Primary	Sep. 14	Joseph W. Bloodgood	Democratic	2,228	58.14%	Chris J. Mohr	Dem.	1,604	41.86%	3,832	624
1954	General	Nov. 2	Joseph W. Bloodgood	Democratic	6,564	70.08%	Donald E. Scheak	Rep.	2,803	29.92%	9,367	3,761

=== Dane County District Attorney (1956, 1958) ===
Year	Election	Date	Elected				Defeated				Total	Plurality
1956	Primary	Sep. 11	Joseph W. Bloodgood	Democratic	9,573	51.46%	William D. Byrne	Dem.	9,028	48.54%	18,601	545
1956	General	Nov. 6	Joseph W. Bloodgood	Democratic	41,417	53.58%	John D. Winner (inc)	Rep.	35,881	46.42%	77,303	5,536
1958	General	Nov. 4	Joseph W. Bloodgood (inc)	Democratic	39,429	62.37%	John D. Winner (inc)	Rep.	23,777	37.61%	63,213	15,652

=== Dane County Superior Court Judge (1960) ===
Dane County Superior Court, Branch 2 Election, 1960
Party	Candidate	Votes	%	±%
Nonpartisan Primary, March 8, 1960 (top-two)
Nonpartisan	William C. Sachtjen	7,795	42.40%	
Nonpartisan	Joseph W. Bloodgood	4,068	22.13%	
Nonpartisan	James C. Geisler	2,177	11.84%	
Nonpartisan	Wayne W. Martin	2,098	11.41%	
Nonpartisan	Joseph Dapin	1,237	6.73%	
Nonpartisan	Solon W. Pierce	1,008	5.48%	
Total votes		18,383	100.0%	
General Election, April, 1960
Nonpartisan	Joseph W. Bloodgood	30,270	51.19%	
Nonpartisan	William C. Sachtjen	28,858	48.81%	
Plurality		1,412	2.39%	
Total votes		59,128	100.0%	

Wisconsin State Assembly
Preceded by Floyd E. Wheeler	Member of the Wisconsin State Assembly from the Dane 1st district January 3, 1955 – January 7, 1957	Succeeded by Norman C. Anderson
Political offices
Preceded by David C. Atwood	Coroner of Dane County, Wisconsin; January 1, 1951 – January 3, 1955	Succeeded by Stanley C. Larsen
Legal offices
Preceded by John D. Winner	District Attorney of Dane County, Wisconsin; January 7, 1957 – May 1, 1860	Succeeded by William D. Byrne
Branch established by 1959 Wis. Act 99	Judge of the Superior Court of Dane County, Wisconsin, Branch 2 May 1, 1860 – July 7, 1960 (died)	Succeeded by Ervin M. Bruner
