= John M. Young =

American politician

Member of the Wisconsin State Assembly
- In office January 7, 1985 – January 5, 1987
- Preceded by: Thomas A. Loftus
- Succeeded by: Margaret Farrow
- Constituency: 99th district
- In office January 3, 1983 – January 7, 1985
- Preceded by: Joseph Looby
- Succeeded by: Joseph Looby
- Constituency: 68th district
- In office January 1, 1979 – January 3, 1983
- Preceded by: Susan Engeleiter
- Succeeded by: Thomas A. Loftus
- Constituency: 99th district

Personal details
- Born: February 3, 1926 Dubuque, Iowa
- Died: December 18, 2010 (aged 84)
- Resting place: Oak Hill Cemetery, Brookfield, Wisconsin
- Party: Republican
- Spouse: Ruth
- Children: 3
- Education: South Dakota State University (B.S.)

Military service
- Allegiance: United States
- Branch/service: United States Marine Corps
- Years of service: 1943–1946
- Battles/wars: World War II

John Martin Young (February 3, 1926 – December 18, 2010) was an American pharmacist and Republican politician. He served 8 years in the Wisconsin State Assembly.

== Biography ==
Young was born on February 3, 1926, in Dubuque, Iowa. After graduating from South Division High School in Milwaukee, Wisconsin, Young attended the University of South Dakota. During World War II, he served in the United States Marine Corps. Young was married and had three children.

== Political career ==
Young was elected to the assembly in 1978. Previously, he was a member of the Brookfield, Wisconsin, Common Council from 1972 to 1978, serving as president from 1976 to 1978. He was a Republican.

Wisconsin State Assembly
Preceded by Susan Engeleiter	Member of the Wisconsin State Assembly from the 99th district January 1, 1979 – January 3, 1983	Succeeded by Thomas A. Loftus
Preceded by Joseph Looby	Member of the Wisconsin State Assembly from the 68th district January 3, 1983 – January 7, 1985	Succeeded by Joseph Looby
Preceded by Thomas A. Loftus	Member of the Wisconsin State Assembly from the 99th district January 7, 1985 – January 5, 1987	Succeeded by Margaret Farrow
