= 2000 United States Senate election in Wisconsin =

- November 7, 2000
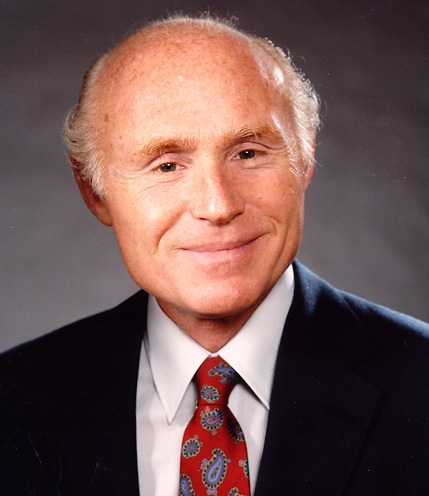

Nominee	Herb Kohl	John Gillespie
Party	Democratic	Republican
Popular vote	1,563,238	940,744
Percentage	61.54%	37.04%
- Kohl: 40–50% 50–60% 60–70% 70–80% 80–90% >90% Gillespie: 40–50% 50–60% 60–70% 70–80% 80–90% >90% Tie
U.S. senator before election
Herb Kohl
Democratic
Elected U.S. Senator
Herb Kohl
Democratic

The 2000 United States Senate election in Wisconsin took place on November 7, 2000. Democratic incumbent Herb Kohl was re-elected to a third term in a landslide over John Gillespie, despite Democratic nominee Al Gore winning the state only very narrowly in the concurrent presidential election.

== General election ==
=== Candidates ===
- John Gillespie, founder of Rawhide Boys Ranch (Republican)
- Eugene A. Hem (Independent)
- Herb Kohl, incumbent U.S. senator (Democratic)
- Tim Peterson (Libertarian)
- Robert R. Raymond (Constitution)

=== Polling ===
Poll source	Date(s)	Sample size	Margin of error	Herb Kohl (D)	John Gillespie (R)	Other / undecided (Note: Calculated by taking the difference of 100% and all other candidates combined.)
Rasmussen Reports	November 5, 2000	1,000	—	56%	39%	5%
Zogby Analytics	November 5, 2000	492	—	61%	32%	7%
Harris Insights & Analytics	November 3, 2000	5,163	—	59%	38%	3%
Zogby Analytics	November 2, 2000	500	—	61%	32%	7%
Zogby Analytics	October 30, 2000	500	—	60%	33%	7%
Market Shares Corp.	October 27, 2000	500	—	60%	27%	13%
Zogby Analytics	October 27, 2000	500	—	65%	31%	4%
Harris Insights & Analytics	October 20, 2000	587	—	67%	24%	9%
University of Wisconsin Survey Center	October 20, 2000	587	—	67%	24%	9%

=== Results ===
General election results
Party	Candidate	Votes	%	±%
Democratic	Herb Kohl (incumbent)	1,563,238	61.54%	+3.23%
Republican	John Gillespie	940,744	37.04%	−3.66%
Libertarian	Tim Peterson	21,348	0.84%	−0.15%
Independent	Eugene A. Hem	9,555	0.38%	N/A
Constitution	Robert R. Raymond	4,296	0.17%	N/A
Independent	Write-ins	902	0.04%	N/A
Total votes		2,540,083	100%	
Democratic hold				

==== Counties that flipped Democratic to Republican ====
- Outagamie (largest city: Appleton)

==== Counties that flipped from Republican to Democratic ====
- Shawano (largest city: Shawano)
- Fond du Lac (largest city: Fond du Lac)
- Juneau (largest city: Mauston)

== See also ==
- 2000 United States Senate elections
