= Karen McQuestion =

American novelist

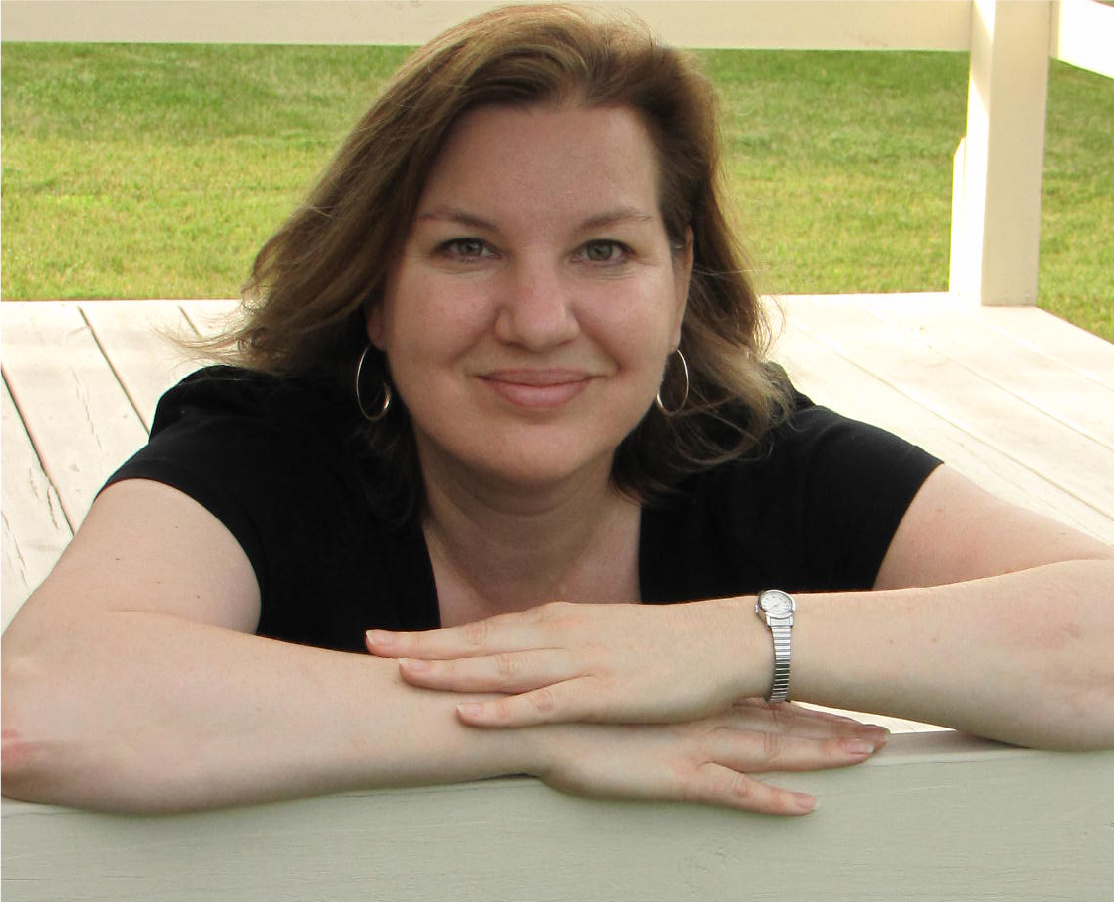
- McQuestion in 2011
- Born: January 16, 1961 (age 65); Milwaukee, Wisconsin, U.S.
- Occupation: Writer
- Writing career
- Genre: Fiction
- Website: www.karenmcquestion.com

Karen McQuestion (born January 16, 1961, Milwaukee, Wisconsin, U.S.) is an American fiction writer who has written books for adults, children and teens. Most of her books include elements of humor or suspense. Her books have sold over a million copies and translation rights to her books have sold for Germany, Turkey, South Korea, and Poland. McQuestion lives in Hartland, Wisconsin with her husband, Greg, and is the mother of Charlie, Maria, and Jack McQuestion.

McQuestion is an advocate of self-publishing. After selling 30,000 copies of her self-published books, she signed a contract with Amazon's first publishing imprint, AmazonEncore to re-release her novel A Scattered Life. McQuestion was the first author who self-published through Amazon's Kindle Direct Publishing platform to secure a movie deal. McQuestion later acknowledged that the option period for the movie deal had expired, and as of May 6, 2013, no information on a film version of A Scattered Life can be found on IMDB.

Jeff Belle, vice president of Amazon Publishing, stated that they discovered McQuestion's books through the use of Kindle and sales data, as well as through positive reader reviews. As of February, 2014, A Scattered Life has reportedly sold more than 190,000 copies.

McQuestion's novel, The Long Way Home, was cited as being one of Amazon Publishing's greatest successes, having sold more than 200,000 copies as of November 2013.

In January 2026, Deadline Hollywood announced that McQuestion's novel, The Moonlight Child, was slated for film with the title And Then She Was Gone, starring NCIS: Los Angeles stars Daniela Ruah and Natalia del Riego. The screenplay was written by Justin Kohlas who will executive produce under his KimberMark banner, alongside Ruah and Riccardo Maddalosso (Armageddon Time).

== Works ==
=== Books for adults ===
1. A Scattered Life
2. Easily Amused
3. The Long Way Home
4. Hello Love
5. Half a Heart (2018)
6. Good Man, Dalton (2019)
7. Missing Her More (2019 sequel to "Good Man, Dalton")
8. Dovetail (2020)
9. The Moonlight Child (2020)
10. 214 Palmer Street (2022)
11. A Limited Run (2022)
12. Written Off (2025)

=== Books for teenagers ===
1. Favorite
2. Life on Hold
3. From a Distant Star
4. Edgewood (Book One in the Edgewood Series)
5. Wanderlust (Book Two in the Edgewood Series)
6. Absolution (Book Three in the Edgewood Series)
7. Revelation (Book Four in the Edgewood Series)

=== Books for children ===
1. Celia and the Fairies
2. Secrets of the Magic Ring
3. Grimm House
4. Prince and Popper
