= Kenneth Merkel =

American politician

Member of the Wisconsin State Assembly from the Waukesha 1st district
- In office 1965–1973
- Succeeded by: district dissolved

Member of the Wisconsin State Assembly from the 99th district
- In office 1973–1975
- Preceded by: district created
- Succeeded by: Susan Jane Shannon

Personal details
- Born: August 9, 1926 Marshfield, Wisconsin
- Died: April 23, 2012 (aged 85)
- Party: Republican
- Spouse: Clemie
- Education: Marquette University

Kenneth John Merkel (August 9, 1926 – April 23, 2012) was a member of the Wisconsin State Assembly for the 99th district.

== Biography ==
Merkel was born on August 9, 1926, in Marshfield, Wisconsin to Wendelin and Marie Merkel. After graduating from Marshfield High School, Markel served in the United States Army Air Corps during World War II. After being discharged in 1945, Merkel briefly attended Michigan State College before graduating from Marquette University in 1949 with a Bachelor of Science degree. Merkel worked as an electrical engineer at Kearney and Trecker.

== Political career ==
Merkel was first elected to the Wisconsin State Assembly in 1964, representing Waukesha County's First Assembly District. After redistricting in 1972, he was reelected to represent the 99th District in the Assembly.

Merkel was a member of the John Birch Society and a fierce defender of Senator Joseph McCarthy, even after his death. At a ceremony marking the tenth anniversary of Senator McCarthy's death, Merkel was a featured speaker, stating that "McCarthyism, a derogatory term coined by the press, is our reminder of Joe's great fight against Communism. You and I are going to have to carry on the work of the great Sen. McCarthy."

Merkel's house in Brookfield, Wisconsin was the target of picketing led by Father James Groppi several times 1969, given Merkel's support for cuts to welfare. After the second round of picketing at his house, Brookfield adopted an ordinance prohibiting residential picketing; when protesters returned the following week to picket, they were promptly arrested.

Merkel retired from the assembly in 1974. After Merkel declared that he would not run for re-election to the Assembly, Governor Patrick Lucey appointed him to a seat on the Wisconsin State Elections Board, the predecessor to the Wisconsin Elections Commission, in July 1974, where he served for several years. Merkel also served as an alderman for the city of Brookfield, Wisconsin.
