= A Scattered Life =

2010 novel by Karen McQuestion

- Cover
- Author: Karen McQuestion
- Language: English
- Publisher: AmazonEncore
- Publication date: August 10, 2010
- Publication place: United States
- Media type: Print (Paperback)
- Pages: 300 (mass market paperback)
- ISBN: 1-935597-06-X (mass market paperback)

A Scattered Life is a 2010 novel written by American author Karen McQuestion and published by AmazonEncore a division of Amazon Publishing. Originally released solely as an e-book for Amazon's Kindle, the novel is notable for being the first self-published Kindle book optioned for film. Producer Eric Lake optioned the rights for the L.A.-based production company, Hiding In Bed, in November 2009.

Set in small-town Wisconsin and told with humor and pathos, A Scattered Life is the story of a friendship triangle between a young wife, her intrusive mother-in-law, and a baby-obsessed mother of five.

== See also ==
- Option (filmmaking)
- Self-publishing
- Amazon Kindle
