= Herb Kohl =

American politician (1935–2023)

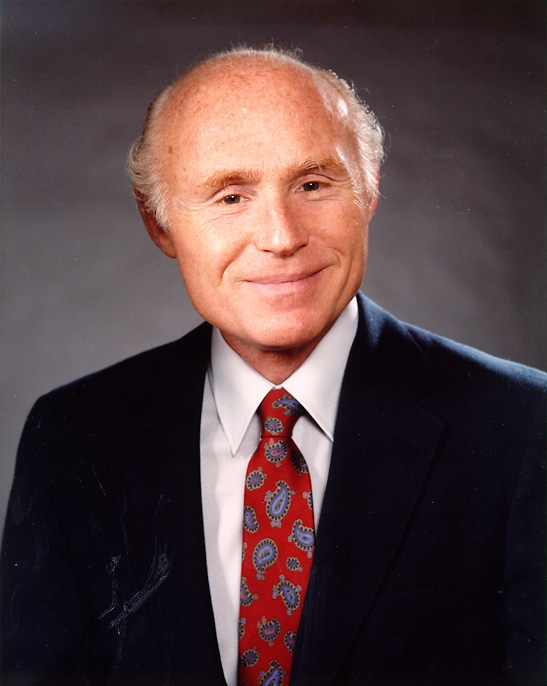

Chair of the Senate Aging Committee
- In office January 3, 2007 – January 3, 2013
- Preceded by: Gordon H. Smith
- Succeeded by: Bill Nelson

United States Senator from Wisconsin
- In office January 3, 1989 – January 3, 2013
- Preceded by: William Proxmire
- Succeeded by: Tammy Baldwin

Chair of the Wisconsin Democratic Party
- In office April 12, 1975 – June 11, 1977
- Preceded by: William Gerrard
- Succeeded by: Michael Bleicher

Personal details
- Born: Herbert Hiken Kohl; February 7, 1935 Milwaukee, Wisconsin, U.S.
- Died: December 27, 2023 (aged 88) Milwaukee, Wisconsin, U.S.
- Party: Democratic
- Education: University of Wisconsin–Madison (BS); Harvard University (MBA)

Military service
- Allegiance: United States
- Branch/service: United States Army
- Years of service: 1958–1964
- Unit: Army Reserve
- Kohl's voice Kohl on an amendment to the America COMPETES Act of 2007; Recorded April 25, 2007

Herbert Hiken Kohl (February 7, 1935 – December 27, 2023) was an American businessman, philanthropist, and Democratic politician from Milwaukee, Wisconsin. He served 24 years as a U.S. senator from Wisconsin, from 1989 to 2013, and earlier served as chairman of the Wisconsin Democratic Party.

From 1970 to 1979, Kohl was president of Kohl's Corporation, his family's business that owned the Kohl's department stores chain. He purchased the Milwaukee Bucks of the National Basketball Association in 1985 to prevent the team from relocating out of Milwaukee. He is also the namesake of the Kohl Center arena on the University of Wisconsin–Madison campus.

== Early life, education, and career ==
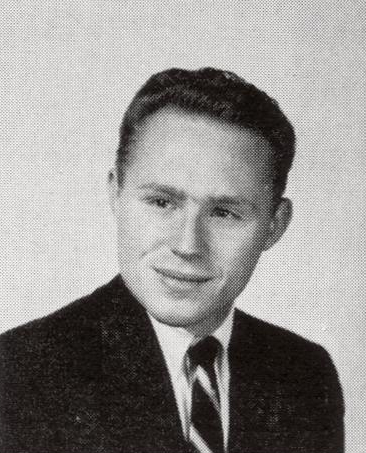
Kohl in the University of Wisconsin–Madison yearbook, 1956

Herbert Hiken Kohl was born on February 7, 1935, and raised in Milwaukee, the son of Mary (née Hiken) and Max Kohl. His father was a Polish Jewish immigrant and his mother was a Russian Jewish immigrant who came to the United States in the 1920s. Kohl attended Washington High School. He earned a Bachelor of Science from the University of Wisconsin–Madison in 1956 and a Master of Business Administration degree from Harvard Business School in 1958. While an undergraduate, he joined the Pi Lambda Phi fraternity. He was also a roommate of Major League Baseball Commissioner Bud Selig. Between 1958 and 1964, Kohl was a member of the United States Army Reserve.

After finishing graduate school, Kohl worked as an investor in real estate and the stock market, eventually spinning off his own company, Kohl Investments, to manage these assets. He and his brother became heirs to a family-owned chain that included 50 grocery stores and several department stores, pharmacies and liquor stores. In 1970, Kohl was named president of Kohl's and served until the corporation was sold to BATUS Inc. (formerly British American Tobacco) in 1978.

After becoming prominent in Wisconsin business circles, Kohl also became involved in state politics as a donor and fundraiser for Patrick Lucey, who was elected Governor of Wisconsin in 1970 and reelected in 1974. After the 1974 election, Kohl first emerged in the state political arena as master of ceremonies at Lucey's second inauguration. Shortly after that inauguration, the chairman of the Democratic Party of Wisconsin, Bill Gerrard—another Lucey ally—resigned. Lucey encouraged Kohl to seek the chairmanship, and Kohl agreed. He was named interim chairman at an April 12, 1975, emergency session, and was then elected by the party's state convention delegates later that summer.

Under Kohl's chairmanship, Democrats won historic victories in the 1976 election, reaching a supermajority in both chambers of the legislature for the first time since the creation of the Republican Party. Wisconsin also gave its electoral votes to the Democratic presidential candidate for the first time since 1964. And during the presidential nominating contest, Wisconsin's Democratic state primary had emerged as one of the pivotal contests in selecting a nominee. Shortly after the 1976 election, Kohl announced he felt that he had accomplished enough as chairman and was ready to step down. He ultimately remained in office until the June 1977 state party convention.

== Milwaukee Bucks ==
Kohl purchased the Milwaukee Bucks of the National Basketball Association (NBA) from Jim Fitzgerald in 1985 for $18 million to ensure the team remained in Milwaukee. In 2003, he considered an offer to sell the team for $170 million to former NBA superstar Michael Jordan, but decided to retain ownership.

In 2013, Kohl began to bring in new partners who were committed to keeping the team in Milwaukee. Kohl agreed to sell the Bucks to New York–based billionaires Wes Edens and Marc Lasry for $550 million on April 16, 2014.

In his ownership, the Bucks went through six head coaches, which started with Don Nelson, who resigned in 1987 after his relationship with Kohl deteriorated. The Bucks never reached the NBA Finals under Kohl's ownership.

== U.S. Senate ==
Incumbent William Proxmire, a Democrat, did not seek reelection to the U.S. Senate in 1988. Kohl ran for the seat and faced Tony Earl, Ed Garvey, and Doug La Follette in the Democratic Party primary election. Kohl won the nomination and defeated Republican Susan Engeleiter in the general election. He was reelected in 1994 against Robert Welch, in 2000 against John Gillespie, and in 2006 against Robert Lorge.

On May 13, 2011, Kohl announced he would not run for re-election in 2012, saying, "The office doesn't belong to me. It belongs to the people of Wisconsin, and there is something to be said for not staying in office too long."

=== Committee assignments ===
- Committee on Appropriations
  - Subcommittee on Agriculture, Rural Development, Food and Drug Administration, and Related Agencies (chairman)
  - Subcommittee on Commerce, Justice, Science, and Related Agencies
  - Subcommittee on Defense
  - Subcommittee on Interior, Environment, and Related Agencies
  - Subcommittee on Labor, Health and Human Services, Education, and Related Agencies
  - Subcommittee on Transportation, Housing and Urban Development, and Related Agencies
- Committee on Banking, Housing, Urban Affairs
  - Subcommittee on Housing, Transportation, and Community Development
  - Subcommittee on Financial Institutions
  - Subcommittee on Security and International Trade and Finance
- Committee on the Judiciary (Vice Chairman)
  - Subcommittee on Antitrust, Competition Policy and Consumer Rights (chairman)
  - Subcommittee on Crime and Drugs
  - Subcommittee on Terrorism, Technology and Homeland Security
- Special Committee on Aging (chairman)

== Political positions ==
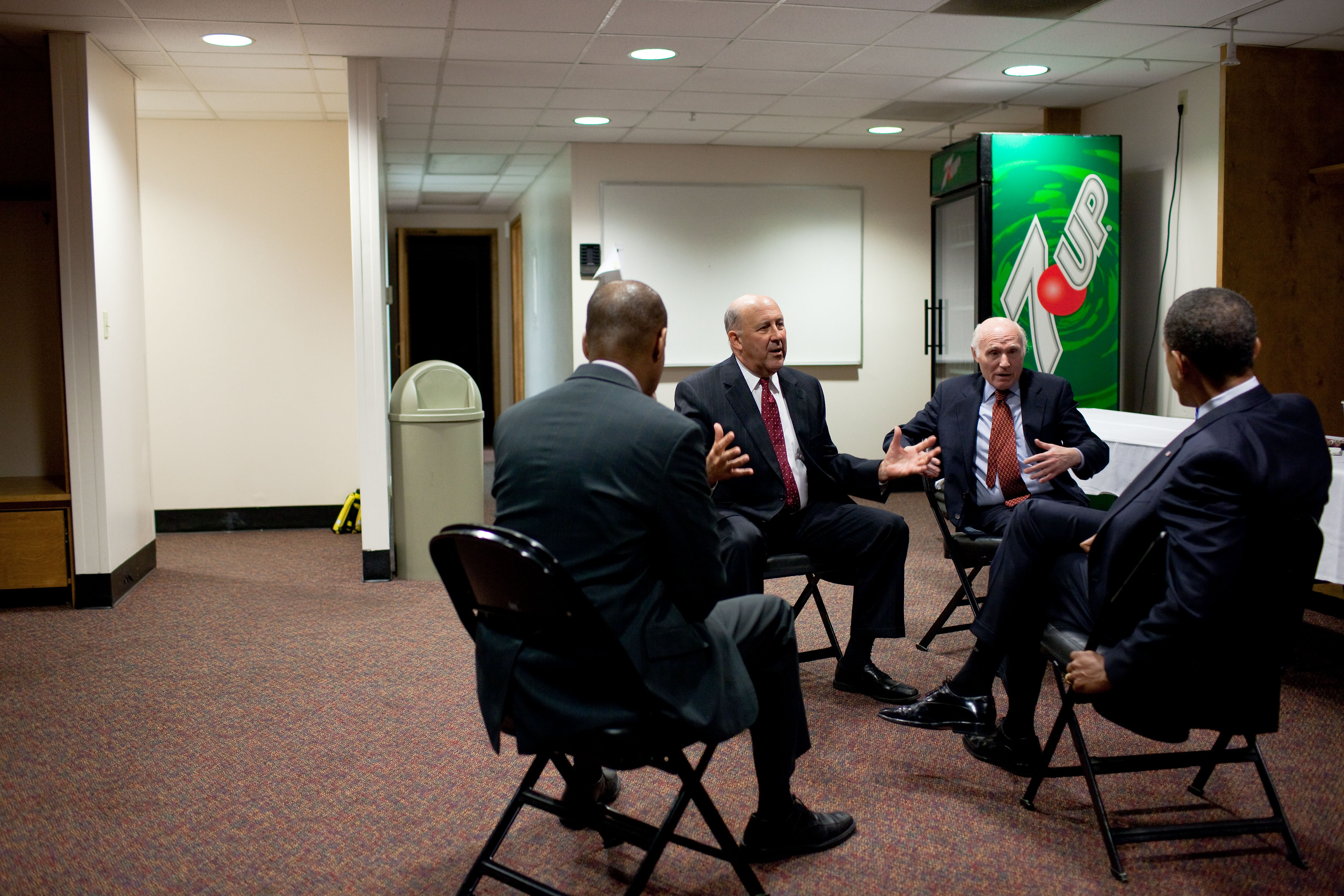
President Barack Obama (right) meets backstage with from left: Political Director Patrick Gaspard, Wisconsin Governor Jim Doyle and Senator Herb Kohl at U.S. Cellular Arena in 2010.

Kohl has been described as having been a populist-leaning liberal.

Kohl supported President Barack Obama's health reform legislation; he voted for the Affordable Care Act in December 2009, and he voted for the Health Care and Education Reconciliation Act of 2010.

=== Fiscal policy ===
Kohl voted in favor of most lawsuit reform measures as well as for rules tightening personal bankruptcy. He long supported amending the U.S. Constitution to require a balanced budget. He was one of the few Democrats to vote for the tax cut passed in 2001, and he also supported the elimination of the "marriage penalty". Despite these views, he was seen as generally supportive of progressive taxation. Like many moderate Democrats, he voted in favor of the welfare reform measures in the mid-1990s. He was also not opposed to the creation of individual, private savings accounts to supplement Social Security.

Kohl generally had a pro-environmental record and was an outspoken proponent of American energy independence. He supported increased production of hydrogen cars, establishing a federal goal for reducing oil consumption by 40 percent, and disallowing oil speculation in protected areas. He voted against corporate average fuel economy standards and was rated highly by groups that desire universal health care. He voted in favor of expanding Medicare and SCHIP and desired that prescription drugs be included under federal health coverage. During his 2006 reelection campaign, Kohl advocated that HMOs be placed under more scrutiny in order to determine if they're effectively delivering care.

=== Social policy ===
Kohl supported abortion rights and opposed the death penalty. He favored affirmative action and supported setting aside funds for women and minorities. Although he voted in favor of the 1996 Defense of Marriage Act, Kohl rejected the proposal to amend the U.S. Constitution to define marriage as between one man and one woman and supported measures that ban discrimination based on sexual orientation. Kohl consistently voted against the Flag Desecration Amendment.

In 2005, Kohl secured a victory for one of his main causes: requiring handguns to be sold with child safety locks. The amendment was attached to the Protection of Lawful Commerce in Arms Act, with every Democrat and many Republicans voting in favor of the amendment. Earlier in his career, he helped push the Gun-Free Schools Act which the U.S. Supreme Court overturned in 1995 and submitted many amendments to that effect. He was a strong supporter of public education and rejected school vouchers. Kohl voted in favor of allowing for the establishment of educational savings accounts.

=== Foreign policy ===
Kohl voted against many free trade agreements including the North American Free Trade Agreement (NAFTA) and the Central America Free Trade Agreement (CAFTA) and voted against the Freedom to Farm Act in 1996. He supported fast-tracked trade normalization with the People's Republic of China and free trade with some of the developing world.

Kohl voted against authorizing the Gulf War in 1990. He voted in 2002 to authorize military force in Iraq. Kohl voted on a number of occasions with more liberal Democrats to reduce military spending, voting against 1996 defense appropriations increases and supporting a veto of funding new military projects. Even though he was among 98 U.S. senators to have voted for the PATRIOT Act, Kohl subsequently opposed this legislation and voted to require warrants for wiretapping or the detention of prisoners.

== Personal life and death ==
Kohl was the wealthiest resident of Milwaukee, the richest Jewish American from Wisconsin, and one of the wealthiest U.S. senators. In 2016, Forbes estimated Kohl's net worth to be $630 million.

Kohl was elected to the Wisconsin Athletic Hall of Fame in 2007. On July 22, 2021, Kohl was the key figure of the lead car in the Milwaukee Bucks NBA Championship parade. On the event, he said: "This is one of the big days of my life." Kohl attended the Bucks' 2021–22 season opener at Fiserv Forum and was presented with a Bucks championship ring for his efforts in keeping the Bucks in Milwaukee.

Kohl died on December 27, 2023, at age 88, at home in Milwaukee, following a brief illness. The next day, Governor Tony Evers ordered that flags be flown at half-staff until his funeral.

=== Philanthropy ===
Kohl donated $25 million to the University of Wisconsin–Madison for construction of its new sports arena, which was named the Kohl Center. In 1990, Kohl established the Herb Kohl Educational Foundation Achievement Award Program, which provides annual grants totaling $400,000 to 200 graduating seniors, 100 teachers, and 100 schools throughout Wisconsin. In 2016, he gave $1.5 million to the Robert M. La Follette School of Public Affairs to create the Herb Kohl Public Service Research Competition, promoting public policy research.

== Electoral history ==
=== U.S. Senate (1988–2006) ===
| Year | Election | Date | Elected | | | | Defeated | | | | Total | Plurality |
|---|---|---|---|---|---|---|---|---|---|---|---|---|
| 1988 | Primary | Sep. 13 | Herb Kohl | Democratic | 249,226 | 46.78% | Tony Earl | Dem. | 203,479 | 38.19% | 533,004 | 45,747 |
| 1988 | Primary | Sep. 13 | Herb Kohl | Democratic | 249,226 | 46.78% | Ed Garvey | Dem. | 55,225 | 10.37% | 533,004 | 45,747 |
| 1988 | Primary | Sep. 13 | Herb Kohl | Democratic | 249,226 | 46.78% | Doug La Follette | Dem. | 19,819 | 3.72% | 533,004 | 45,747 |
| 1988 | Primary | Sep. 13 | Herb Kohl | Democratic | 249,226 | 46.78% | Edmund Hou-Seye | Dem. | 5,040 | 0.95% | 533,004 | 45,747 |
| 1988 | General | Nov. 8 | Herb Kohl | Democratic | 1,128,625 | 52.08% | Susan Engeleiter | Rep. | 1,030,440 | 47.55% | 2,167,257 | 98,185 |
| 1988 | General | Nov. 8 | Herb Kohl | Democratic | 1,128,625 | 52.08% | George W. Zaehringer | Ind. | 3,965 | 0.18% | 2,167,257 | 98,185 |
| 1988 | General | Nov. 8 | Herb Kohl | Democratic | 1,128,625 | 52.08% | Patricia Grogan | Ind. | 3,029 | 0.14% | 2,167,257 | 98,185 |
| 1988 | General | Nov. 8 | Herb Kohl | Democratic | 1,128,625 | 52.08% | Arlyn F. Wollenburg | Ind. | 1,198 | 0.06% | 2,167,257 | 98,185 |
| 1994 | Primary | Sep. 13 | Herb Kohl (inc) | Democratic | 135,982 | 89.72% | Edmund Hou-Seye | Dem. | 15,579 | 10.28% | 151,561 | 120,403 |
| 1994 | General | Nov. 8 | Herb Kohl (inc) | Democratic | 912,662 | 58.31% | Robert T. Welch | Rep. | 636,989 | 40.70% | 1,565,090 | 275,673 |
| 1994 | General | Nov. 8 | Herb Kohl (inc) | Democratic | 912,662 | 58.31% | James Dean | Lib. | 15,439 | 0.99% | 1,565,090 | 275,673 |
| 2000 | Primary | Sep. 12 | Herb Kohl (inc) | Democratic | 184,920 | 89.78% | Jim Sigl | Dem. | 20,858 | 10.13% | 205,981 | 164,062 |
| 2000 | General | Nov. 7 | Herb Kohl (inc) | Democratic | 1,563,238 | 61.54% | John Gillespie | Rep. | 940,744 | 37.04% | 2,540,083 | 622,494 |
| 2000 | General | Nov. 7 | Herb Kohl (inc) | Democratic | 1,563,238 | 61.54% | Tim Peterson | Lib. | 21,348 | 0.84% | 2,540,083 | 622,494 |
| 2000 | General | Nov. 7 | Herb Kohl (inc) | Democratic | 1,563,238 | 61.54% | Eugene A. Hem | Ind. | 9,555 | 0.38% | 2,540,083 | 622,494 |
| 2000 | General | Nov. 7 | Herb Kohl (inc) | Democratic | 1,563,238 | 61.54% | Robert R. Raymond | Con. | 4,296 | 0.17% | 2,540,083 | 622,494 |
| 2006 | Primary | Sep. 12 | Herb Kohl (inc) | Democratic | 308,178 | 85.66% | Ben Masel | Dem. | 51,245 | 14.24% | 359,758 | 256,933 |
| 2006 | General | Nov. 7 | Herb Kohl (inc) | Democratic | 1,439,214 | 67.31% | Robert G. Lorge | Rep. | 630,299 | 29.48% | 2,138,297 | 808,915 |
| 2006 | General | Nov. 7 | Herb Kohl (inc) | Democratic | 1,439,214 | 67.31% | Rae Vogeler | Grn. | 42,434 | 1.98% | 2,138,297 | 808,915 |
| 2006 | General | Nov. 7 | Herb Kohl (inc) | Democratic | 1,439,214 | 67.31% | Ben J. Glatzel | Ind. | 25,096 | 1.17% | 2,138,297 | 808,915 |

== See also ==
- List of Harvard University politicians
- List of Jewish members of the United States Congress
- List of richest American politicians

Party political offices
| Preceded by William Gerrard | Chair of the Wisconsin Democratic Party; 1975–1977 | Succeeded by Michael Bleicher |
| Preceded by William Proxmire | Democratic nominee for U.S. Senator from Wisconsin (Class 1); 1988, 1994, 2000, 2006 | Succeeded by Tammy Baldwin |
Sporting positions
| Preceded by Jim Fitzgerald | Owner of the Milwaukee Bucks; 1985–2014 | Succeeded by Wesley Edens; Marc Lasry |
U.S. Senate
| Preceded by William Proxmire | U.S. Senator (Class 1) from Wisconsin; 1989–2013; Served alongside: Bob Kasten, Russ Feingold, Ron Johnson | Succeeded by Tammy Baldwin |
| Preceded by John Breaux | Ranking Member of the Senate Aging Committee; 2005–2007 | Succeeded by Gordon Smith |
| Preceded by Gordon Smith | Chair of the Senate Aging Committee; 2007–2013 | Succeeded by Bill Nelson |
