= David Hermelin =

American diplomat (1936–2000)

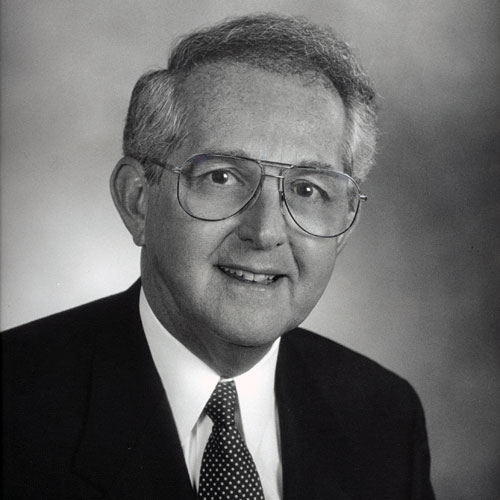

United States Ambassador to Norway
- In office January 8, 1998 – January 7, 2000
- President: Bill Clinton
- Preceded by: Thomas A. Loftus
- Succeeded by: Robin Chandler Duke

Personal details
- Born: David B. Hermelin; December 27, 1936 Detroit, Michigan, U.S.
- Died: November 22, 2000 (aged 63) Detroit, Michigan, U.S.
- Spouse: Doreen Hermelin
- Education: University of Michigan

David B. Hermelin (December 27, 1936 – November 22, 2000) was United States ambassador to Norway and a Detroit area philanthropist and entrepreneur and a graduate of the University of Michigan’s Ross School of Business.

The David B. Hermelin Volunteer Fundraising Award at the University of Michigan honors David Hermelin. The ORT Hermelin College of Engineering in Netanya, Israel, was named in his honor. It opened in October, 2000.

On December 13, 2000, he was presented, posthumously, with the Presidential Citizens Medal by President Clinton.

In 2000, Hermelin died of a brain tumor at 63 years old.

== See also ==
- List of notable brain tumor patients

== Sources ==
- ORT Hermelin College of Engineering: Biography
- University of Michigan press release
- United States Department of State: Ambassadors to Norway

Diplomatic posts
Preceded by Thomas A. Loftus	United States Ambassador to Norway; 1998–2000	Succeeded by Robin Chandler Duke
