= Hartland station =

Historic rail station

Hartland
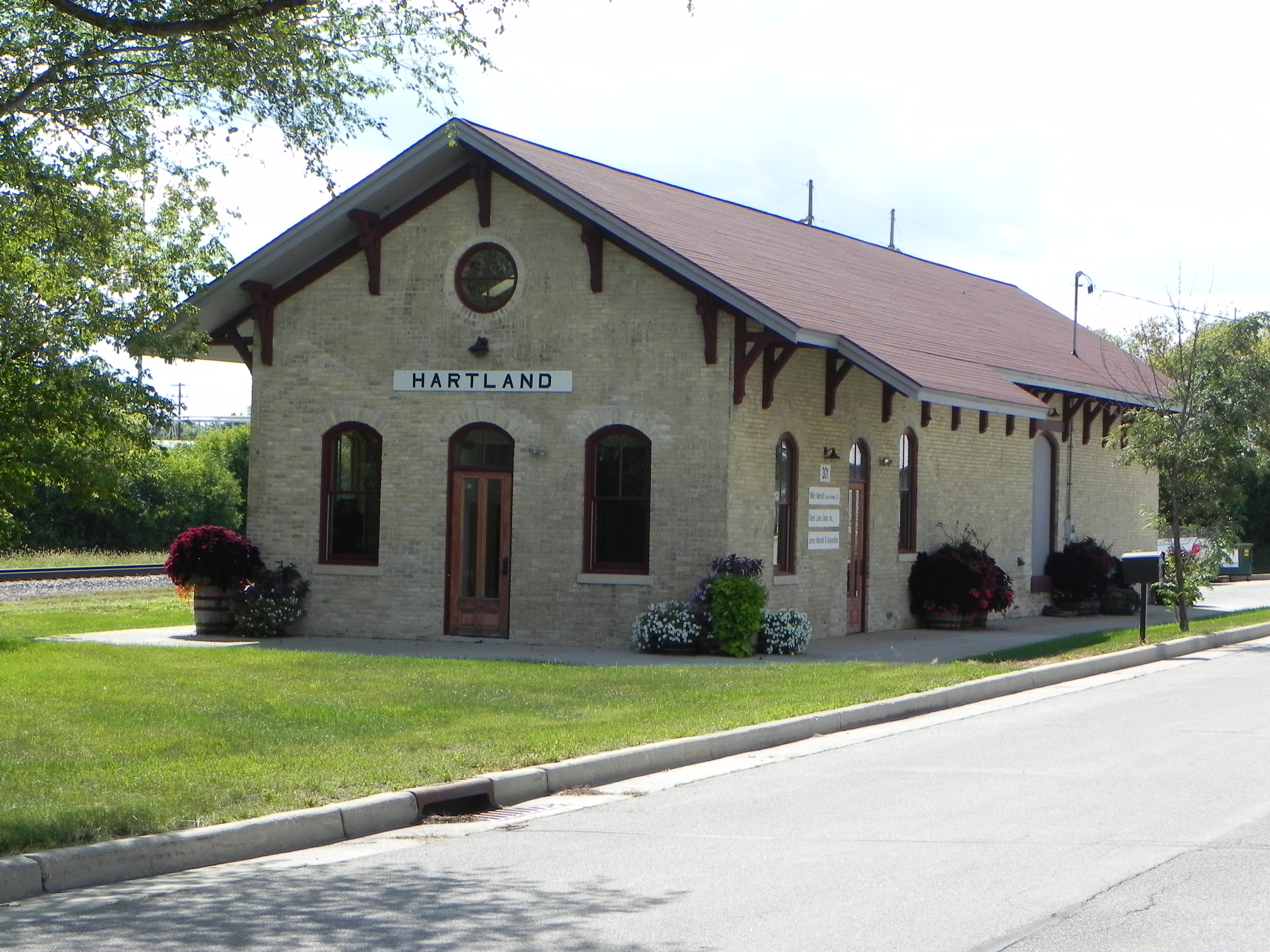
- The depot in 2014

General information
- Location: 301 Pawling Ave., Hartland, Wisconsin 53029
- Coordinates: 43°06′01″N 88°20′57″W
- System: Former Milwaukee Road passenger rail station
- Line: Milwaukee Road

History
- Opened: 1854
- Closed: 1969
- Rebuilt: 1869, 1879, 1899, 1916

Services
Preceding station	Milwaukee Road	Following station
Nagawicka toward Watertown	Suburban Service Watertown – Milwaukee	Lakeside toward Milwaukee
Nashotah toward Madison	Madison – Milwaukee via Watertown	Pewaukee toward Milwaukee
- Hartland Railroad Depot
- U.S. National Register of Historic Places
- Location within Wisconsin Location within the United States
- Coordinates: 43°06′01″N 88°20′57″W
- Built: 1879
- Architectural style: Italianate
- NRHP reference No.: 86003417
- Added to NRHP: April 21, 1988
Location

The Hartland Railroad Depot in Hartland, Wisconsin is a railroad depot built in 1879 for the Chicago, Milwaukee, and St. Paul Railroad. The depot was the third depot to be built in Hartland. The first depot was built in 1854 with the arrival of the Milwaukee and Watertown Railroad. This was replaced in 1869, but that depot fell victim to a lightning strike and burned down. Therefore, the current Italianate brick depot was built as a replacement. In 1899, the railroad decided to build a more impressive depot, and the 1879 structure was moved slightly to the west to become a freight depot. However, the 1899 depot was destroyed in a 1916 fire and replaced with another depot in 1917, which served until 1969 before being demolished.

The 1879 Italianate depot is the only one of the five depots in Hartland to survive. The depot incorporated an agent's quarters, a waiting room and a freight room. It was listed on the National Register of Historic Places on April 21, 1988.
