= Dewey K. Warren =

Canadian-American physician and politician

Dewey K. Warren (December 8, 1820 – October 11, 1866) was a medical doctor from Delafield, Wisconsin who served a single term as a member of the first Wisconsin State Assembly in the 1st Wisconsin Legislature of 1848.

== Biography ==
Warren was born in Canada on December 8, 1820. The Warren family's stay in Canada was brief, as after Dewey was born the family moved to the US. He was a Democratic member of the Assembly during the 1848 session. He was also the Sheriff of Waukesha County, Wisconsin. He would be succeeded by fellow Democrat Albert Alden. Eventually becoming a physician, he and his wife Sarah, had one daughter, Ann. His brother, Stephen Warren, was also a member of the Assembly. Warren died on October 11, 1866, in Boston, Massachusetts, and was buried in Hartland, Wisconsin.
