= Chauncey G. Heath =

American politician (1818–1899)

Member of the Wisconsin State Assembly from the Waukesha 3rd district
- In office June 5, 1848 – January 1, 1849
- Preceded by: Position established
- Succeeded by: Thomas Sugden

Personal details
- Born: January 27, 1818 Tompkins County, New York, U.S.
- Died: July 21, 1899 (aged 81) Seneca Falls, New York, U.S.
- Resting place: Prairie Home Cemetery, Waukesha, Wisconsin
- Party: Democratic
- Spouse: Frances Minerva Williams (died 1876)
- Children: Frances Lorinda (Eldridge) (b. 1847; died 1930)

Chauncey Graham Heath (January 27, 1818 – July 21, 1899) was a member of the Wisconsin State Assembly during the 1st Wisconsin Legislature (1848) representing central Waukesha County.

== Biography ==
Heath was born on January 27, 1818, in Tompkins County, New York. His parents were Milo Heath and Sally Nash. Later a resident of Pewaukee, Wisconsin, Heath was married to Frances Williams. He died on July 21, 1899, and would be buried in Waukesha, Wisconsin.

== Career ==
Heath was a member of the Assembly during the 1848 session. He was a Democrat.

Wisconsin State Assembly
New state government	Member of the Wisconsin State Assembly from the Waukesha 3rd district June 5, 1848 – January 1, 1849	Succeeded by Thomas Sugden
