= Hartland, Wisconsin =

- Village
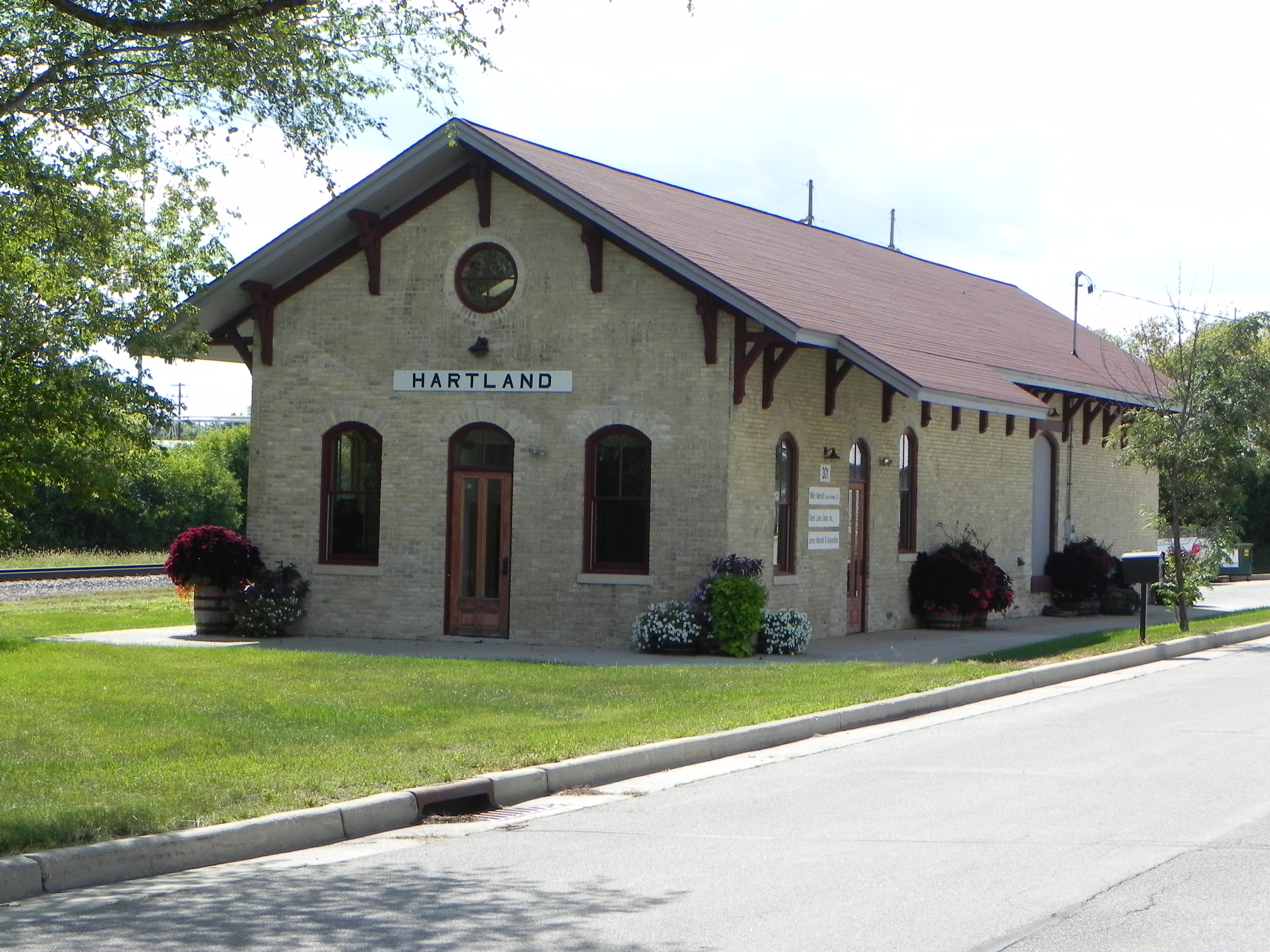
- Hartland station
- Interactive map of Hartland, Wisconsin
- Location within Wisconsin Location within the United States
- Coordinates: 43°6′1″N 88°20′40″W
- Country: United States
- State: Wisconsin
- County: Waukesha

Area
  - Total: 5.51 sq mi (14.27 km^{2})
  - Land: 5.46 sq mi (14.14 km^{2})
  - Water: 0.050 sq mi (0.13 km^{2})
- Elevation: 935 ft (285 m)

Population (2020)
  - Total: 9,501
  - Density: 1,707.1/sq mi (659.11/km^{2})
- Time zone: UTC-6 (Central (CST))
  - Summer (DST): UTC-5 (CDT)
- ZIP Code: 53029
- Area code: 262
- FIPS code: 55-33100
- GNIS feature ID: 1566105
- Website: www.villageofhartland.wi.gov

Hartland is a village in Waukesha County, Wisconsin, United States. It is located along the Bark River and is part of the Milwaukee metropolitan area. The population was 9,501 at the 2020 census.

== History ==
The following places in Hartland are listed on the National Register of Historic Places listings in Waukesha County, Wisconsin: Ralph C. Bailie House, Bank of Hartland, Beaumont Hop House, Burr Oak Tavern, Dansk Evangelical Lutheran Kirke, East Capitol Drive Historic District, First Congregational Church, Hartland Railroad Depot, Harold Hornburg House, Jackson House, Sign of the Willows, Trapp Filling Station, Sarah Belle Van Buren House, Stephen Warren House, and Zion Evangelical Lutheran Church.

== Geography ==
Hartland is located at 43°6′1″N 88°20′40″W (43.100180, −88.344452). It is in the Lake Country area of Waukesha County.

According to the United States Census Bureau, the village has a land area of 5.46 square miles (2020 Census).

== Demographics ==
Historical population
Census	Pop.	Note	%±
1880	287		—
1890	486		69.3%
1900	629		29.4%
1910	728		15.7%
1920	800		9.9%
1930	945		18.1%
1940	998		5.6%
1950	1,190		19.2%
1960	2,068		73.8%
1970	2,763		33.6%
1980	5,559		101.2%
1990	6,906		24.2%
2000	7,905		14.5%
2010	9,110		15.2%
2020	9,501		4.3%
U.S. Decennial Census

=== 2010 census ===
As of the census of 2010, there were 9,110 people, 3,566 households, and 2,440 families living in the village. The population density was 1,779.3 inhabitants per square mile (687.0/km^{2}). There were 3,746 housing units at an average density of 731.6 per square mile (282.5/km^{2}). The racial makeup of the village was 95.1% White, 0.8% African American, 0.3% Native American, 1.7% Asian, 0.1% Pacific Islander, 0.5% from other races, and 1.4% from two or more races. Hispanic or Latino of any race were 2.9% of the population.

There were 3,566 households, of which 37.3% had children under the age of 18 living with them, 54.4% were married couples living together, 10.2% had a female householder with no husband present, 3.8% had a male householder with no wife present, and 31.6% were non-families. 26.4% of all households were made up of individuals, and 10.2% had someone living alone who was 65 years of age or older. The average household size was 2.55 and the average family size was 3.12.

The median age in the village was 37.5 years. 28% of residents were under the age of 18; 7.3% were between the ages of 18 and 24; 26.4% were from 25 to 44; 28.2% were from 45 to 64; and 10% were 65 years of age or older. The gender makeup of the village was 47.4% male and 52.6% female.

=== 2000 census ===
As of the census of 2000, there were 7,905 people, 3,002 households, and 2,161 families living in the village. The population density was 1,753.7 people per square mile (676.7/km^{2}). There were 3,140 housing units at an average density of 696.6 per square mile (268.8/km^{2}). The racial makeup of the village was 97.70% White, 0.28% African American, 0.33% Native American, 0.48% Asian, 0.43% from other races, and 0.78% from two or more races. Hispanic or Latino of any race were 1.51% of the population.

There were 3,002 households, out of which 41.3% had children under the age of 18 living with them, 57.4% were married couples living together, 11.0% had a female householder with no husband present, and 28.0% were non-families. 22.3% of all households were made up of individuals, and 7.2% had someone living alone who was 65 years of age or older. The average household size was 2.63 and the average family size was 3.13.

In the village, the population was spread out, with 29.7% under the age of 18, 7.8% from 18 to 24, 33.5% from 25 to 44, 21.5% from 45 to 64, and 7.5% who were 65 years of age or older. The median age was 34 years. For every 100 females, there were 93.7 males. For every 100 females age 18 and over, there were 92.7 males.

The median income for a household in the village was $58,359, and the median income for a family was $67,844. Males had a median income of $48,475 versus $30,253 for females. The per capita income for the village was $26,537. About 1.8% of families and 2.6% of the population were below the poverty line, including 2.2% of those under age 18 and 3.9% of those age 65 or over.

== Recreation ==
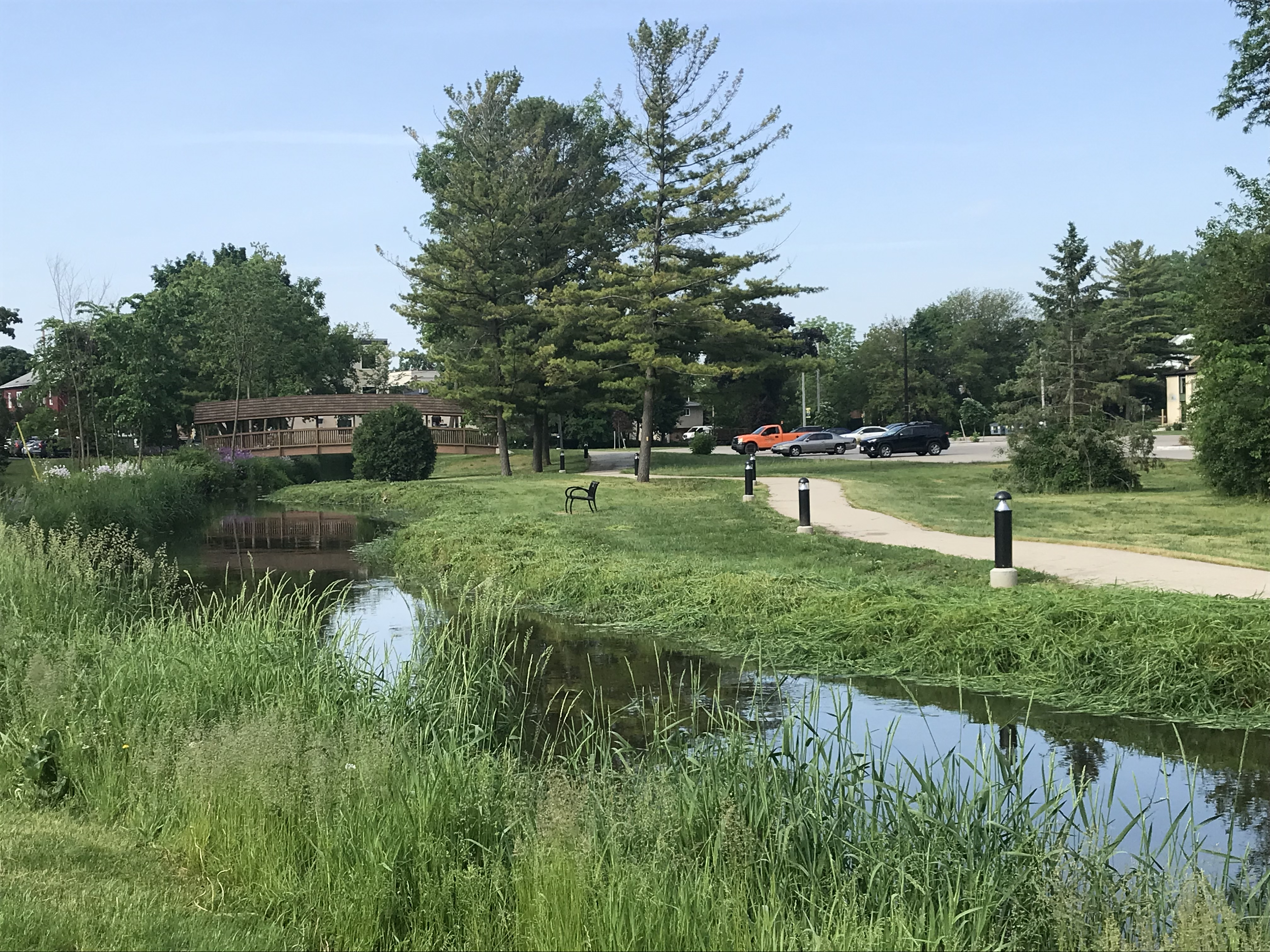
Bark River Greenway

Nixon Park is located on land that originally was owned by H. G. B. Nixon, a doctor whose family settled in Hartland. He donated the land to the village in the 1920s. His old house still stands on Capitol Drive near the downtown area of Hartland. Camp Whitcomb/Mason, a Boys and Girls Clubs summer camp, is located near Hartland.

== Education ==
All of Hartland is served by the Arrowhead Union High School District. The Arrowhead district's only secondary school is Arrowhead High School. Different portions of Hartland are in different K-8 districts: Hartland-Lakeside Joint No. 3 School District, Lake Country School District, Swallow School District, and Merton Community School District.

Lake Country Lutheran High School and University Lake School are private schools in Hartland. Divine Redeemer Lutheran School is a K-8 private school.

The village is home to the Hartland Public Library.

== Notable people ==
- Ben Askren, freestyle and folkstyle wrestler, 2008 Olympian in freestyle, professional MMA fighter
- Ben Bredeson, NFL offensive lineman
- Charles Carpenter, football player for Wisconsin Badgers
- Judson Hall, Wisconsin State Assembly
- Nick Hayden, NFL defensive tackle
- Doug Henry, retired MLB pitcher; bullpen coach for the Kansas City Royals
- Karen McQuestion, author
- David Merkow, professional golfer
- Mitchell Mesenbrink, American wrestler
- Keegan O'Toole, folkstyle and freestyle wrestler, two-time NCAA champion and Junior World freestyle champion
- Joe Panos, NFL offensive lineman
- Molly Seidel, Olympic bronze medalist in the marathon
- Dewey K. Warren, Wisconsin State Assembly
- Stephen Warren, Wisconsin State Assembly

== See also ==
- List of villages in Wisconsin
