= Dansk Evangelical Lutheran Kirke =

Historic church in Wisconsin, United States

- U.S. National Register of Historic Places
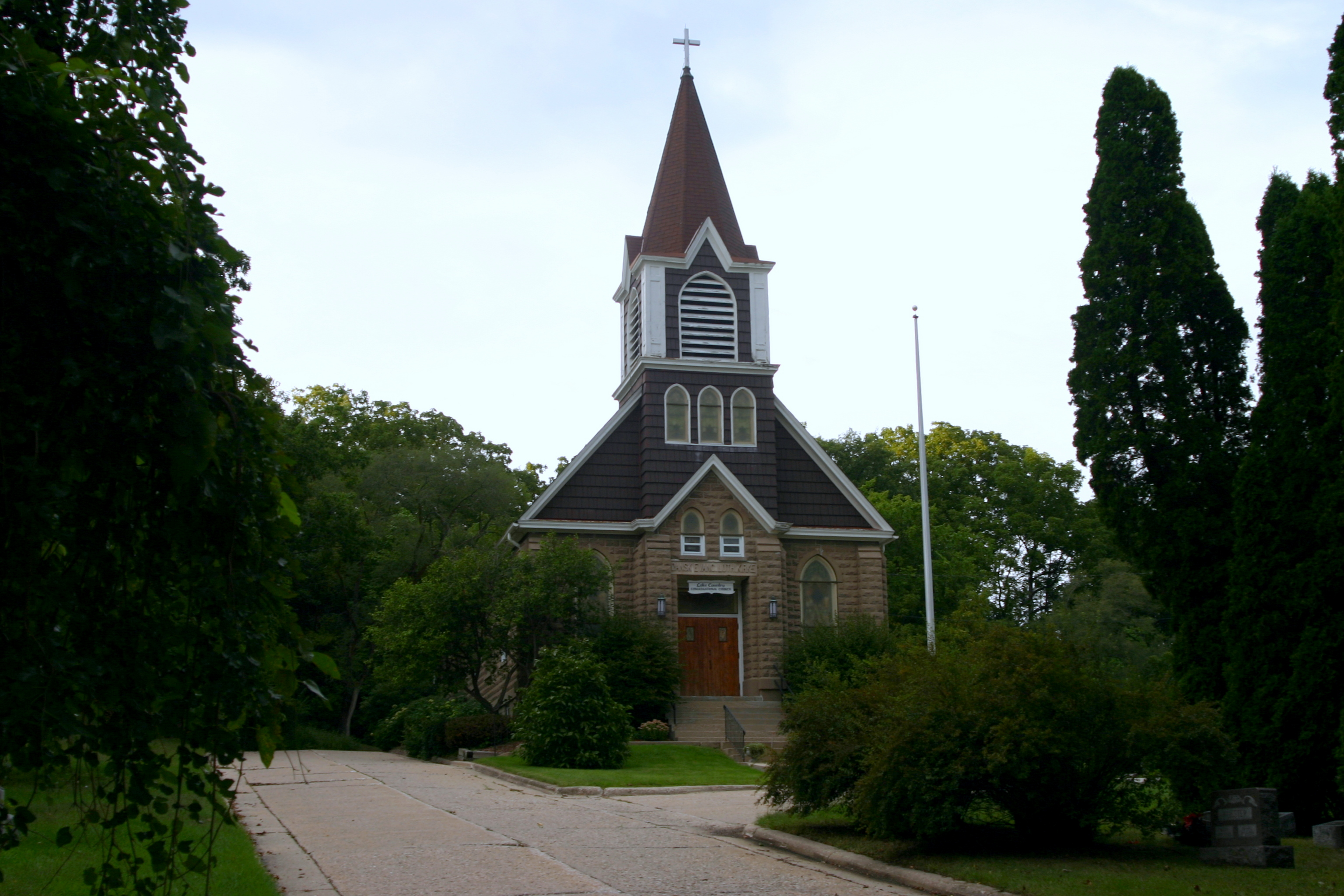
- Dansk Evangelical Lutheran Kirke
- Location: 400 W. Capitol Dr., Hartland, Wisconsin
- Coordinates: 43°06′09″N 88°21′10″W
- Area: 1.9 acres (0.77 ha)
- Built: 1910
- Architectural style: Late Gothic Revival, Romanesque Revival
- MPS: Hartland MRA
- NRHP reference No.: 86003422
- Added to NRHP: April 21, 1988

The Dansk Evangelical Lutheran Kirke is a Gothic Revival-styled Lutheran church built in 1910 by the Danish-speaking congregation in Hartland, Wisconsin, United States. It was listed on the National Register of Historic Places in 1988 and on the State Register of Historic Places the following year.

== History ==
The first Danish immigrants arrived in the Hartland area about 1845, with a peak between 1855 and 1861. In 1867 a group met in the Jacob Blitsch house to organize a Lutheran church, and resolved, "we invite all and everyone, without distinction of creed or sect, to help us by contribution (of) as much as possible... The regular service will be held in the English language, but should it be desired to have it held in the German, or Danish, it may be done before or after the service is over." The following year the joint Danish and German congregation held their first service in their new church building on Oconomowoc Street.

In 1910 the congregation split between the Danish and the German. The Danes bought out the Germans' share of the building, demolished it, and built a new church, the one that stands today. The walls are coursed concrete block with a rough, rock-face finish that suggests Romanesque Revival style. However, the lancet tops of the windows and the steeple point toward heaven - Gothic Revival elements. And the front gable end is covered in shingles, a decoration typically seen in Queen Anne-style homes. J.P. Peterson of Hartland was the contractor and Nels Lund of Menomonee Falls did the concrete work.

From 1918 to 1931 half of the services were still preached in Danish. In 1975 the church became Lake Country Congregational Church.
