= Pitts Ellis =

American politician

Pitts Ellis (February 29, 1808 – February 1, 1875) was an American shoemaker, farmer, and politician.

Born in Murray, New York, Ellis moved to Michigan Territory in 1832 living in Nile and Tecumseh. Then in 1839, he moved to Wisconsin Territory settling in North Prairie and then in Genesee, Wisconsin. Ellis was a farmer, shoemaker, and in the grain business.

Ellis served in the Wisconsin Territorial House of Representatives as a Democrat. He served in the first Wisconsin Constitutional Convention of 1846. He also served in local government. In 1850, he served in the Wisconsin State Assembly. He died in Genesee, Wisconsin, on February 1, 1875.
