= Glenn L. Henry =

American lawyer and politician

Glenn L. Henry (August 25, 1921 – January 23, 2002) was an American lawyer and politician.

Born in Tomah, Wisconsin, Henry went to grade and high school in Madison, Wisconsin. He served in the United States Navy from 1942 to 1946 and again from 1950 to 1952. He received his degree from the University of Wisconsin–Madison and his law degree from the University of Wisconsin Law School. He practiced law in Madison and served as Dane County assistant district attorney from 1947 to 1950 and from 1952 to 1953. Henry served on the Madison Common Council from 1956 to 1958, and on the Wisconsin State Assembly in 1959 as a Democrat. He died in Madison, Wisconsin.
