= Floyd E. Wheeler =

American politician, teacher, and lawyer (1905–1995)

Floyd Ernest Wheeler (March 18, 1905 – February 9, 1995) was an American politician, teacher, and lawyer.

Born in Beloit, Wisconsin, Wheeler received his bachelor's degree from Beloit College and his law degree from University of Wisconsin Law School. He also did graduate work at Harvard Law School. He practiced law, taught at Evansville High School, and was the assistant physical director at the Beloit YMCA. Wheeler was also the assistant to the dean of the University of Wisconsin College of Letters and Science. In 1953, Wheeler served in the Wisconsin State Assembly and was a Democrat. He lived in Madison, Wisconsin and died there in 1995.
