= Zion Evangelical Lutheran Church (Hartland, Wisconsin) =

Historic church in Wisconsin, United States

- U.S. National Register of Historic Places
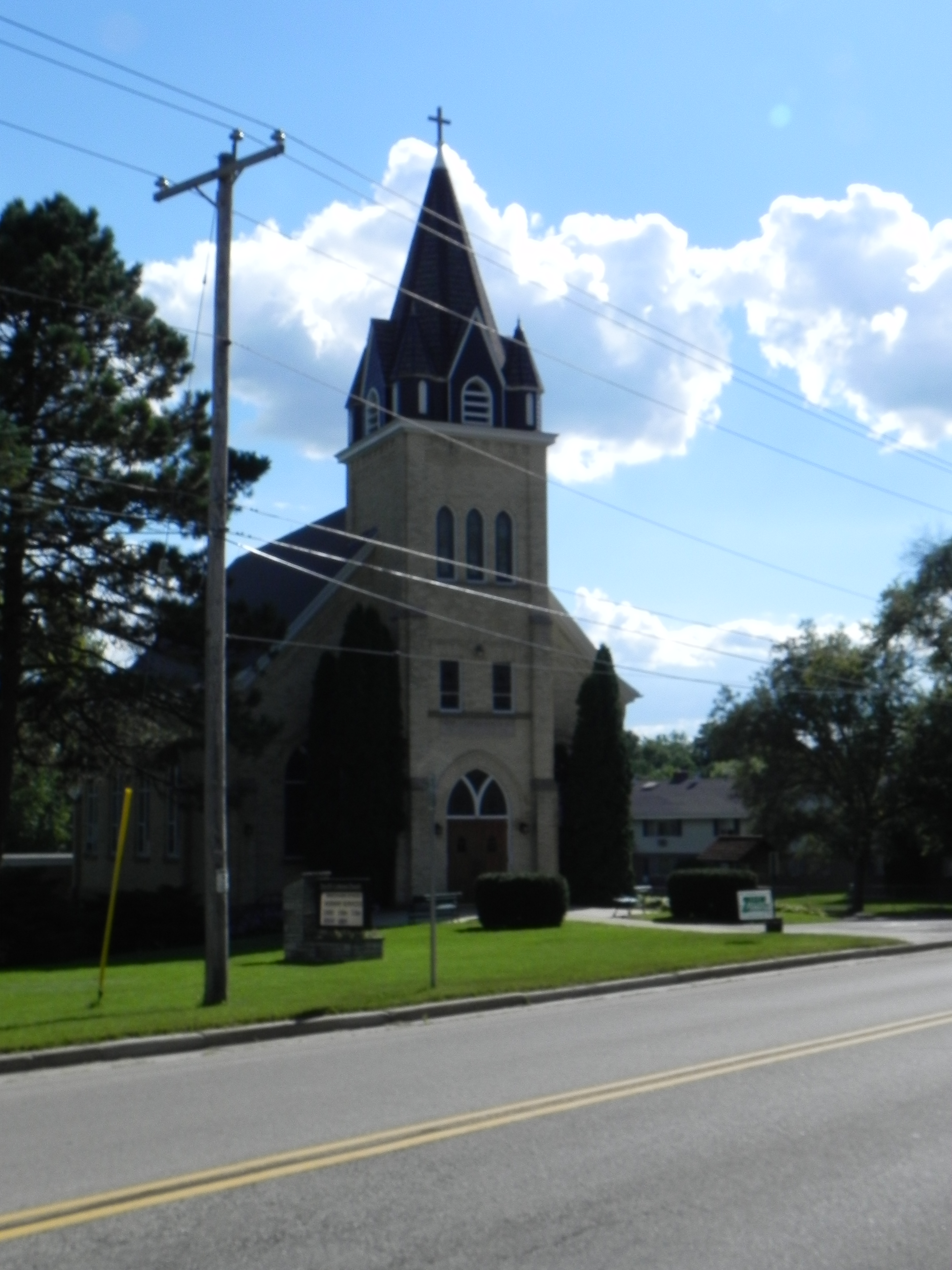

- Location within Wisconsin Location within the United States
- Location: 403 W. Capitol Dr., Hartland, Wisconsin
- Coordinates: 43.10158°N 88.35350°W
- Built: 1910, 1951
- Built by: J. P. Peterson; Bernard Nienow
- Architectural style: Late Gothic Revival
- MPS: Hartland MRA
- NRHP reference No.: 86003423
- Added to NRHP: December 8, 1986

Zion Evangelical Lutheran Church is a Neogothic Revival-styled church built in 1910 in Hartland, Wisconsin to serve its German-speaking Lutheran congregation. It was listed on the National Register of Historic Places in 1986.

Many Germans settled in Hartland in the mid-1800s. In 1867 local Germans and Danes formed a Lutheran congregation, constructing a church building. By 1910 there were strains, and the congregation split along ethnic lines. The Danes bought the old church, across the street from this building.

The Germans built this new church building in 1910, with J.P. Peterson and Bernard Nienow as general contractors and the members donating labor. The foundation is fieldstone, with cream brick walls sitting on that, sheltered under a gable roof. The front square tower has a shingled spire topped with a cross. The NRHP nomination deems the building architecturally significant "as a good local example of the Gothic Revival style", but it is a rather squat Gothic Revival, with only a hint of a point on the arches. A 1951 addition to the rear does not detract from the building's architectural integrity.

The current pastors are Reverends Steven Ristow and Ben Steenbock.
