= 2026 Waukesha County Executive special election =

Local election in Wisconsin

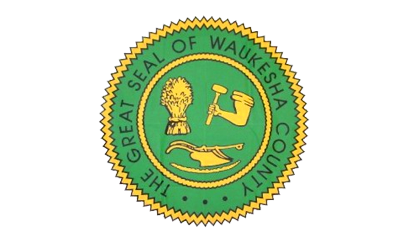
- December 15, 2026

Candidate	Chris Kapenga	Adam Neylon
Party	Nonpartisan	Nonpartisan
Incumbent county executive
Tom Farley

The 2026 Waukesha County Executive special election will be held on December 15, 2026, to elect the county executive of Waukesha County, Wisconsin. The special election was triggered upon the death of former county executive Paul Farrow. Tom Farley was appointed to the position, and is not running in the special election.

== Candidates ==
=== Declared ===
- Chris Kapenga, Republican state senator from the 33rd district (2015–present)
- Adam Neylon, Republican state assemblymember (2013–present)

== Results ==
2026 Waukesha County Executive special election
Candidate	Votes	%
Chris Kapenga		
Adam Neylon		
Write-in		
Total votes		100.00
