= Senator Farrow =

Senator Farrow may refer to:

- Margaret Farrow (1934–2022), Wisconsin State Senate
- Paul Farrow (born 1964), Wisconsin State Senate
