= Don Pridemore =

21st century American politician

Member of the Wisconsin State Assembly
- In office January 7, 2013 – January 5, 2015
- Preceded by: Sandy Pasch
- Succeeded by: Janel Brandtjen
- Constituency: 22nd Assembly district
- In office January 3, 2005 – January 7, 2013
- Preceded by: Michael A. Lehman
- Succeeded by: Chris Kapenga
- Constituency: 99th Assembly district

Personal details
- Born: October 20, 1946 (age 79) Milwaukee, Wisconsin, U.S.
- Party: Republican
- Education: Marquette University (BS)
- Profession: Engineer, politician

Donald Pridemore (born October 20, 1946) is an American retired electrical engineer and Republican politician from Hartford, Wisconsin. He was a member of the Wisconsin State Assembly for 10 years, from 2005 to 2015. He also ran unsuccessfully for Wisconsin Superintendent of Public Instruction in 2013, for Wisconsin Senate in a 2021 special election, and for Wisconsin's 98th Assembly district in 2024.

== Early life ==
Pridemore was born in Milwaukee, Wisconsin, and graduated from Milwaukee Lutheran High School in 1964. From 1965 to 1969 he served in the U.S. Air Force. In 1977, he received a Bachelor of Science degree in electrical engineering from Marquette University. Before entering politics, Pridemore worked in electrical engineering.

== Political career ==
Pridemore was elected to the Wisconsin State Assembly in 2004, and won re-election four more times.

=== Wisconsin State Assembly ===
==== 2010 Primary ====
In 2010, Pridemore faced a three-way primary for the 99th District from Hartford Mayor Scott Henke and former Sussex Village Trustee Jim Batzko. With endorsements from the NRA Political Victory Fund, and a 100% rating from Wisconsin Right to Life, Pridemore won with 58% of the vote.

==== 2012 Primary ====
Redistricting moved Pridemore to the 22nd District. Hartford was no longer in his district, but most of Menomonee Falls and parts of Milwaukee were. In 2012, Nick Oliver challenged Pridemore for the Republican nomination for the 22nd Assembly District. With endorsements from the Menomonee Falls Taxpayer Association, talk-radio host Mark Belling, and Governor Scott Walker, Pridemore defeated Oliver 83% to 17%.

Pridemore was unopposed in the general election after a review by the Wisconsin Government Accountability Board found that Democratic challenger Chad Bucholtz was 13 signatures short of the 200 needed to be on the ballot.

==== 2014 ====
On April 9, 2014, Pridemore announced that he was retiring from the Wisconsin Assembly.

==== Healthcare whistleblowers ====
Pridemore has sponsored legislation to protect whistleblowers in the health care industry. His bill was supported by the Milwaukee Journal Sentinel.

==== Election reform ====
Pridemore has introduced legislation to require photo identification in Wisconsin elections. Special registration deputies would also be required to have a criminal background check. His bill would also move the party primaries from September to August so as not to conflict with a federal law intended to give military and overseas voters enough time to vote.

==== Nonmarital parenthood and child abuse ====
In 2012, Pridemore cosponsored a bill that recognized "nonmarital parenthood as a contributing factor to child abuse and neglect". He commented that in some situations there may be other options than divorce, stating "If they can refind those reasons and get back to why they got married in the first place it might help." Politifact rated as "True" the bill author's claim that children in a nonmarital parenthood setting "have a 20 times greater chance of being sexually abused."

==== Dog breeders ====
In 2011, Pridemore sponsored legislation that would redefine "commercial breeder" to protect hobby breeders and rescues from restrictions targeting large scale 'puppy mills.' The previous restrictions had been implemented by former governor Jim Doyle in an effort to prevent 'puppy mills' where dogs live in abusive and neglectful conditions The Dog Federation of Wisconsin argued that the previous restrictions were negatively impacting "rescue groups and smaller humane societies". The previous restrictions were resulting in increased "dumping" of dogs in rural counties.

==== 2024 election ====
On February 26, 2024, Pridemore announced he would be a candidate for the 98th Assembly district. He was defeated in the primary by Jim Piwowarczyk.

District 96 Republican primary
Party	Candidate	Votes	%
Republican	Jim Piwowarczyk	7,583	65.12
Republican	Don Pridemore	4,044	34.73
Write-in		18	0.15
Total votes		11,645	100.0

=== Superintendent of Public Instruction ===
In December 2012, Pridemore announced he would be running for the Wisconsin Superintendent of Public Instruction office in the Wisconsin April 2013 Election. In the April 2013 Wisconsin election, Pridemore was defeated by Tony Evers.

=== Wisconsin State Senate ===
==== 2021 special election ====
Pridemore ran for the 13th State Senate district in a 2021 special election. His residence was challenged, but the challenge was unsuccessful and he remained on the ballot. Pridemore lost the Republican primary election to John Jagler.

== Controversy ==
In 2009, the Democratic Party of Wisconsin filed a complaint with the Government Accountability Board alleging that Pridemore's criticism of a candidate for Superintendent of Public Instruction in a press release issued on his state letterhead violated state law.

== Notes ==
Wisconsin State Assembly
Preceded by Michael A. Lehman	Member of the Wisconsin State Assembly from the 99th district January 3, 2005 – January 7, 2013	Succeeded by Chris Kapenga
Preceded by Sandy Pasch	Member of the Wisconsin State Assembly from the 22nd district January 7, 2013 – January 5, 2015	Succeeded by Janel Brandtjen
