= Jim Piwowarczyk =

21st century American politician

Member of the Wisconsin State Assembly from the 98th district
- Incumbent
- Assumed office January 6, 2025
- Preceded by: Adam Neylon

Personal details
- Born: James M. Piwowarczyk II; June 22, 1970 (age 56) Ogden, Utah, U.S.
- Party: Republican
- Spouse: Susan LeBell Slatinsky
- Children: 3
- Education: Moraine Park Technical College (A.S.); Marian University (attended)
- Profession: Law enforcement, politician
- Website: Official website; Campaign website

James M. Piwowarczyk II (born June 22, 1970) is an American realtor, Republican politician, and former law enforcement officer from Washington County, Wisconsin. He is a member of the Wisconsin State Assembly, and represents Wisconsin's 98th Assembly district in the 2025–2026 term. He is also a co-founder and editor of the conservative news website Wisconsin Right Now.

== Early life and career ==
Jim Piwowarczyk was born in Ogden, Utah on June 22, 1970. He was raised and educated in the West Bend area, graduating from Kewaskum High School in 1988. He went on to attend Moraine Park Technical College and Marian University, studying police science and justice administration.

In 1994, he was hired as a police patrol officer in Glendale, Wisconsin, and served 15 years in that department, rising to the rank of patrol sergeant. After leaving the Glendale police, he worked as a part-time officer in Kewaskum. While working as a police officer, he also started a small business with his wife, as a Snap Fitness franchisee, and ultimately owned five gyms in southeastern Wisconsin, but sold out in 2020. During those years, he was also becoming active in real estate trading through his realty business Realty Solutions Group, which he continues to operate.

== Political career ==
In 2020, Piwowarczyk co-founded the conservative partisan news website Wisconsin Right Now, and as owner of the website, has final editorial control over the content. Wisconsin Right Now has become an influential voice in the conservative and Republican media landscape in Wisconsin. One of their first major news stories was a story questioning the validity of the election results from Milwaukee County in the 2020 United States presidential election, and suggesting the election was rigged against Donald Trump. Piwowarczyk won a prize for excellence in journalism from the Milwaukee Press Club in 2021 for coverage of the multi-day story of the Water Street shootings in Milwaukee, and in 2022 for coverage of the controversial parole decision of Douglas Balsewicz.

In 2024, the Wisconsin Legislature adopted a new redistricting plan after the Wisconsin Supreme Court struck down the decade-old Republican legislative gerrymander. Washington County was significantly affected by the redistricting; Piwowarczyk was drawn into the new 98th Assembly district, where no incumbent legislators then-resided. He announced in March 2024 that he would run for Wisconsin State Assembly in that district, seeking the Republican nomination. He was opposed by former state representative Don Pridemore, but won the primary by a wide margin, taking 65% of the vote. He easily won the general election in the heavily Republican district. He took office in January 2025.

== Personal life and family ==
Jim Piwowarczyk is a son of James M. and Cynthia Piwowarczyk. James Sr. served for many years as county auditor in Washington County; Cynthia worked as a registered nurse.

Jim Piwowarczyk married Susan L. Slatinsky of Green Bay; they met while attending Marian University. They have three school-age children and reside in the town of Erin, Wisconsin.

== Electoral history ==
=== Wisconsin Assembly (2024) ===
Year	Election	Date	Elected				Defeated				Total	Plurality
2024	Primary	Aug. 13	Jim Piwowarczyk	Republican	7,583	65.12%	Don Pridemore	Rep.	4,044	34.73%	11,645	3,539
2024	General	Nov. 5	Jim Piwowarczyk	Republican	28,823	71.08%	Del A. Schmechel	Dem.	11,698	28.85%	40,551	17,125
