= Angela Woollacott =

Australian historian

- Born: 1955 (age 70–71); Adelaide, South Australia
- Awards: Fellow of the Royal Historical Society (1994); Fellow of the Academy of the Social Sciences in Australia (2006); Fellow of the Australian Academy of the Humanities (2014)

Academic background
- Education: Australian National University (BA, LLB); University of Adelaide (BA (Hons)); University of California, Santa Barbara (PhD)
- Thesis: (1988)

Academic work
- Institutions: Australian National University; Macquarie University; Case Western Reserve University
- Main interests: Australian history women's and gender history settler colonialism postcolonial history.

Angela Mary Woollacott (born 1955) is an Australian historian who has contributed to the history of the British Empire and Australia. She has written many books and journal articles, as well as a series of Australian history textbooks, served on the editorial boards for Journal of Women's History, Journal of British Studies, and Lilith: A Feminist History Journal, and served on the international advisory board for Settler Colonial Studies. She is a past president of the Australian Historical Association.

A review said of one of Woollacott's books, "Woollacott has written a stimulating and thought-provoking study of the nature and dynamics of settler colonialism in the southern colonies. It sets an agenda for new research and will prompt historians to re-examine many of their assumptions about colonial society in Australia."

== Select publications ==
=== Books ===
- Woollacott, Angela (1994). On her their lives depend : munitions workers in the Great War. University of California Press.
- Sinha, Mrinalini; Donna J. Guy & Angela Woollacott, eds. (1999). Feminisms and internationalism. Blackwell.
- Woollacott, Angela (2001). To try her fortune in London : Australian women, colonialism, and modernity. Oxford University Press.
- — (2006). Gender and empire. Palgrave Macmillan.
- Deacon, Desley; Russell, Penny & Woollacott, Angela, eds. (2010). Transnational lives : biographies of global modernity, 1700–present. Palgrave Macmillan.
- Woollacott, Angela (2011). Race and the modern exotic : three 'Australian' women on global display. Monash University Publishing.
- Cooke, Miriam G. & Angela Woollacott (2014). Gendering war talk. Princeton University Press.
- Woollacott, Angela (2019). Don Dunstan : the visionary politician who changed Australia. Allen & Unwin.
