= Jennifer Burns =

Jennifer Burns may refer to:

- Jennifer Burns (politician), American politician from Arizona
- Jennifer Soileau, American soccer player and coach, known as Jennifer Burns
- Jennifer Burns (historian), American historian and author
- Jennifer Burns (actress) on List of Power Rangers Lost Galaxy characters

== See also ==
- Jennifer Burnes, musician
- Jennifer Byrne, Australian journalist, television presenter and book publisher
- Jennifer Byrne (research scientist)
