= Michael A. Lehman =

American politician

Member of the Wisconsin State Assembly from the 99th district
- In office January 5, 2003 – January 3, 2005
- Preceded by: Frank Urban
- Succeeded by: Don Pridemore
- Constituency: 99th district
- In office January 4, 1993 – January 5, 2003
- Preceded by: Steven D. Loucks
- Succeeded by: Glenn Grothman
- Constituency: 58th district
- In office January 2, 1989 – January 4, 1993
- Preceded by: Dwight A. York
- Succeeded by: Mary Panzer
- Constituency: 59th district

Personal details
- Born: April 24, 1943 Rice Lake, Wisconsin, U.S.
- Died: August 7, 2017 (aged 74)
- Party: Republican

Michael A. Lehman (April 24, 1943 – August 7, 2017) was an American Republican politician from Wisconsin.

Born in Rice Lake, Wisconsin, Lehman graduated from Hartford Union High School in Hartford, Wisconsin. He went to Moraine Park Technical College and Milwaukee Area Technical College. Lehman lived in Hartford, Wisconsin. He worked as a salesman and also worked in hospitals and in road construction. Lehman served in the Wisconsin State Assembly from 1989 until 2005, when he was defeated for re-election in the Republican primary election in 2004. Lehman died in Hartford, Wisconsin.
