= Theodore Kanavas =

American politician

Member of the Wisconsin Senate from the 33rd district
- In office 2001–2011
- Preceded by: Margaret Farrow
- Succeeded by: Rich Zipperer

Personal details
- Born: April 29, 1961
- Died: July 3, 2017 (aged 56)
- Party: Republican
- Profession: businessman

Theodore James "Ted" Kanavas (April 29, 1961 – July 3, 2017) was an American politician and businessman.

== Biography ==
Kanavas was raised in Brookfield, Wisconsin and graduated from Brookfield East High School. He graduated from the University of Wisconsin–Madison in 1983. While attending the school, Kanavas worked as an aide to Congressman Jim Sensenbrenner. Kanavas subsequently attended Pepperdine University's school of law. Kanavas also worked in the software industry. He served on the Elmbrook School District Board from 1999 to 2002.

In July 2001, he was elected to the Wisconsin Senate as a Republican in a special election, defeating Democrat Dawn Marie Sass, and he was re-elected in 2002. On January 25, 2010, Kanavas announced he would not seek reelection.

In 1991, Kanavas married Mary Hayes of Shorewood, Wisconsin. They had three children- Kelly, Nicholas, and Katherine.

In 2014, Kanavas co-founded Michael Best Strategies, a government relations and public policy firm. He died of cancer on July 3, 2017.

== Notes ==
Wisconsin Senate
| Preceded by Margaret Farrow | Wisconsin State Senator - 33rd District; 2001 – 2011 | Succeeded by Rich Zipperer |
