= Northeast Wisconsin Technical College =

Public two-year college in Wisconsin, U.S.

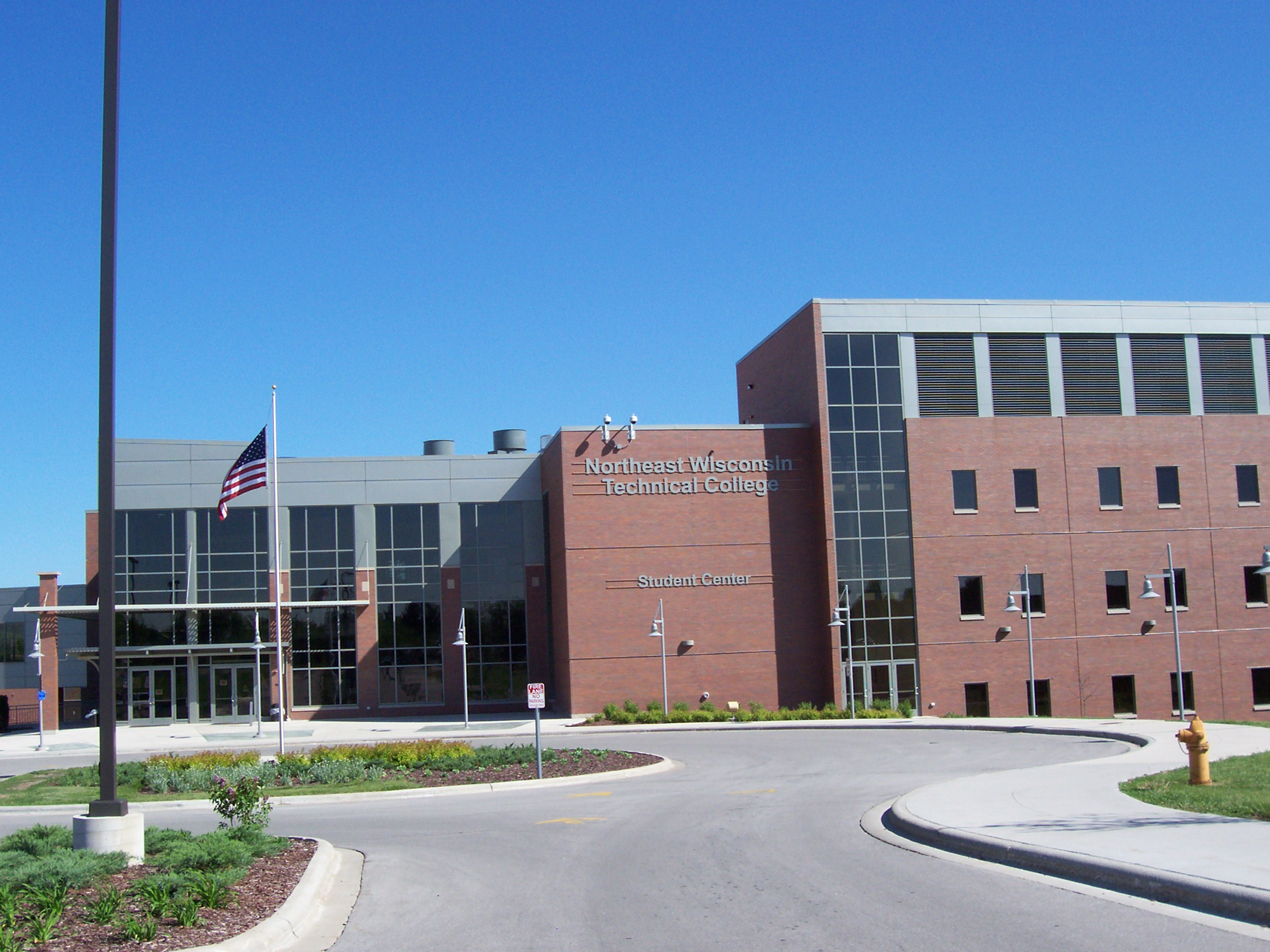
- Student Center at the main campus in Green Bay
- Motto: Soar higher
- Established: 1912
- President: Kristen Raney
- Students: 41,500
- Location: Green Bay, Wisconsin, United States; 44°31′35″N 88°06′22″W
- Campus: Urban
- Mascot: Eagle
- Website: www.nwtc.edu

Northeast Wisconsin Technical College (NWTC) is a public technical college with multiple locations in Wisconsin. The college serves nine Wisconsin counties with three campuses in Green Bay, Marinette, and Sturgeon Bay, and five regional learning centers in Shawano, Oconto Falls, Crivitz, Aurora, and Luxemburg. It is part of the Wisconsin Technical College System. The college serves approximately 41,500 students annually.

== Academics ==
NWTC offers over 70 associate degree programs, technical diplomas, apprenticeships, and 86 certificates. The college also offers employee training, technical assistance, and consulting through the Corporate Training and Economic Development Department. From 2010 to 2011, NWTC served 1,084 businesses with customized training either on-site or in the classroom, training 20,083 employees.

== History ==
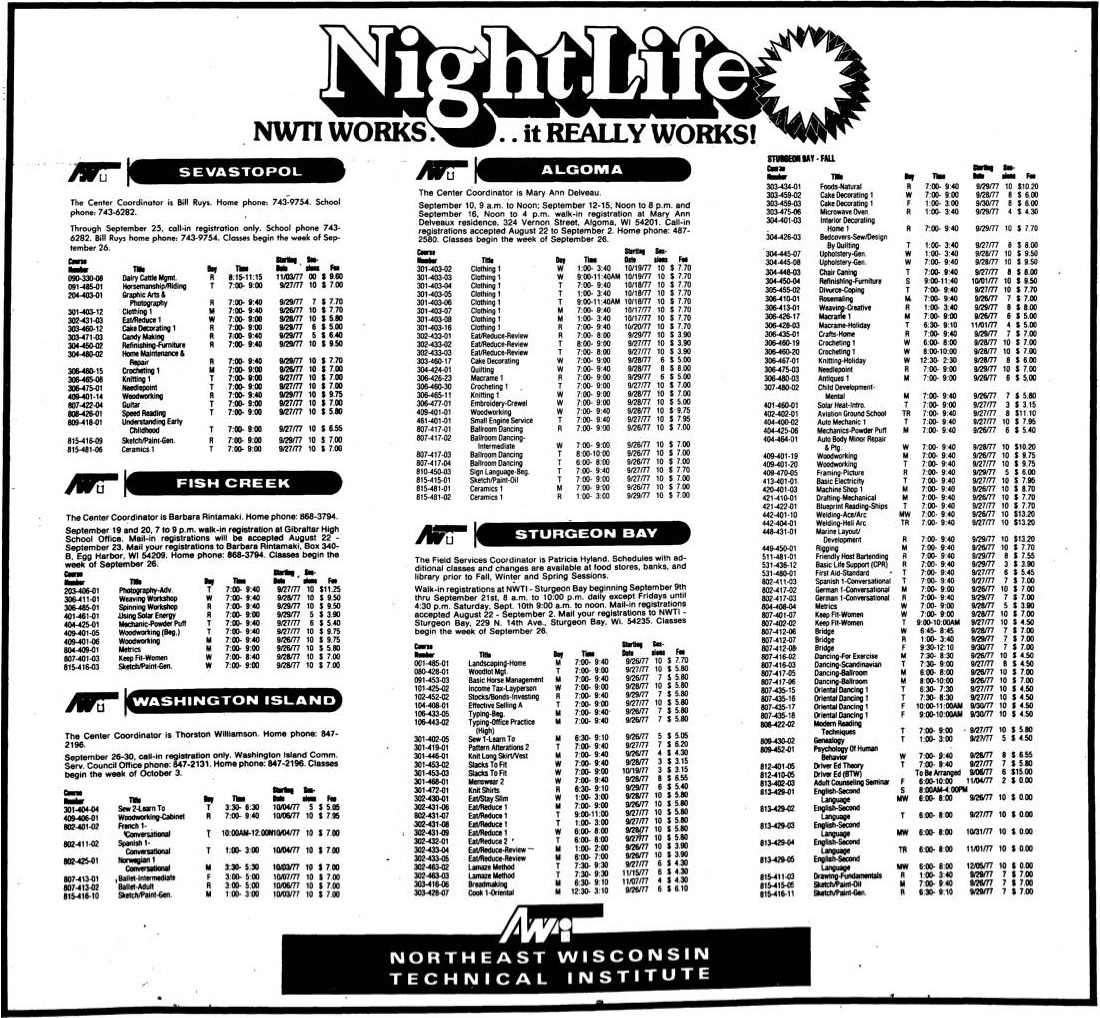
The 1977 course catalog for Northeast Wisconsin Technical Institute, prior to the name change

Wisconsin's technical colleges were founded to train the work force. In the early 1900s, most workers in Wisconsin received their education through the apprenticeship system—both job skills and academic skills. In order to standardize the education that these working young adults received in, reading, writing, and math, the state of Wisconsin promoted the creation of city vocational schools. Schools sprang up in Green Bay and Marinette in 1912, followed by a school in Sturgeon Bay in 1941. Their scope expanded to include adults of all ages interested in technical careers, regardless of whether they were currently in the workforce. In 1968, the three schools merged to become a single district in the Wisconsin Technical College System, serving part or all of nine counties under the name Northeast Wisconsin Technical Institute. This name was changed to Northeast Wisconsin Technical College in the late 1980s.
