= Western Technical College =

Public college in La Crosse, Wisconsin, US

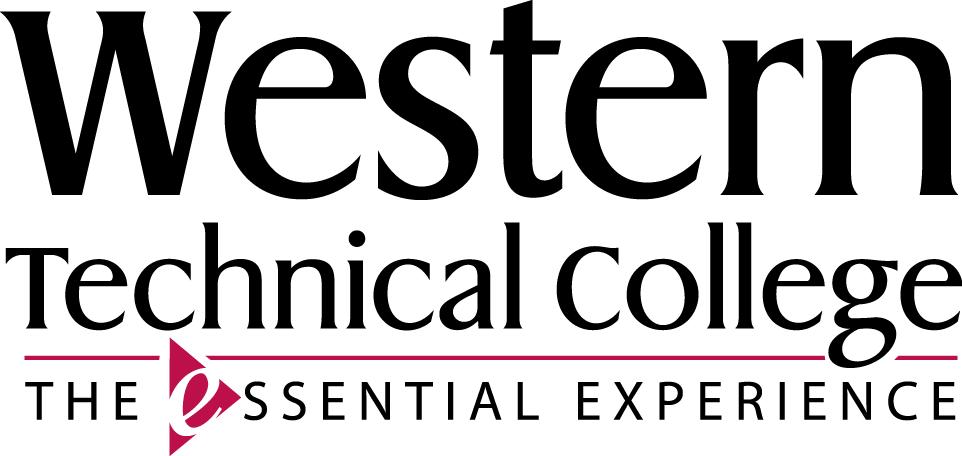
- Type: Public technical college
- Established: 1912
- Parent institution: Wisconsin Technical College System
- Affiliations: National Junior College Athletic Association
- President: Roger Stanford
- Students: 8,000 program students and 16,600 continuing ed
- Location: La Crosse, Wisconsin, United States
- Campus: Urban
- Colors: Black & Red
- Mascot: Cavaliers
- Website: www.westerntc.edu

Western Technical College (Western or WTC) is a public technical college in La Crosse, Wisconsin. A member of the Wisconsin Technical College System, the Western Technical College District serves 11 counties and enrolls over 5,000 students. The college has six campus locations in western Wisconsin and its main campus is in downtown La Crosse. Western is accredited by the Higher Learning Commission.

== History ==
Founded in 1912, the school was previously known as Western Wisconsin Technical College (WWTC), but "Wisconsin" was dropped on March 29, 2006. Western received voter approval for facilities improvement via referendums in 1992 ($8.9 million), 1996 ($3.65 million), and 2012 ($79.8 million).

=== Former names ===
Former names of the college include:

- 1912-17: La Crosse Continuation and Adult Schools
- 1917-63: La Crosse Vocational School
- 1963-65: Coleman Vocational and Adult Schools
- 1965-68: Coleman Technical Institute
- 1968-87: Western Wisconsin Technical Institute
- 1987-2006: Western Wisconsin Technical College
- 2006–present: Western Technical College

== Locations ==
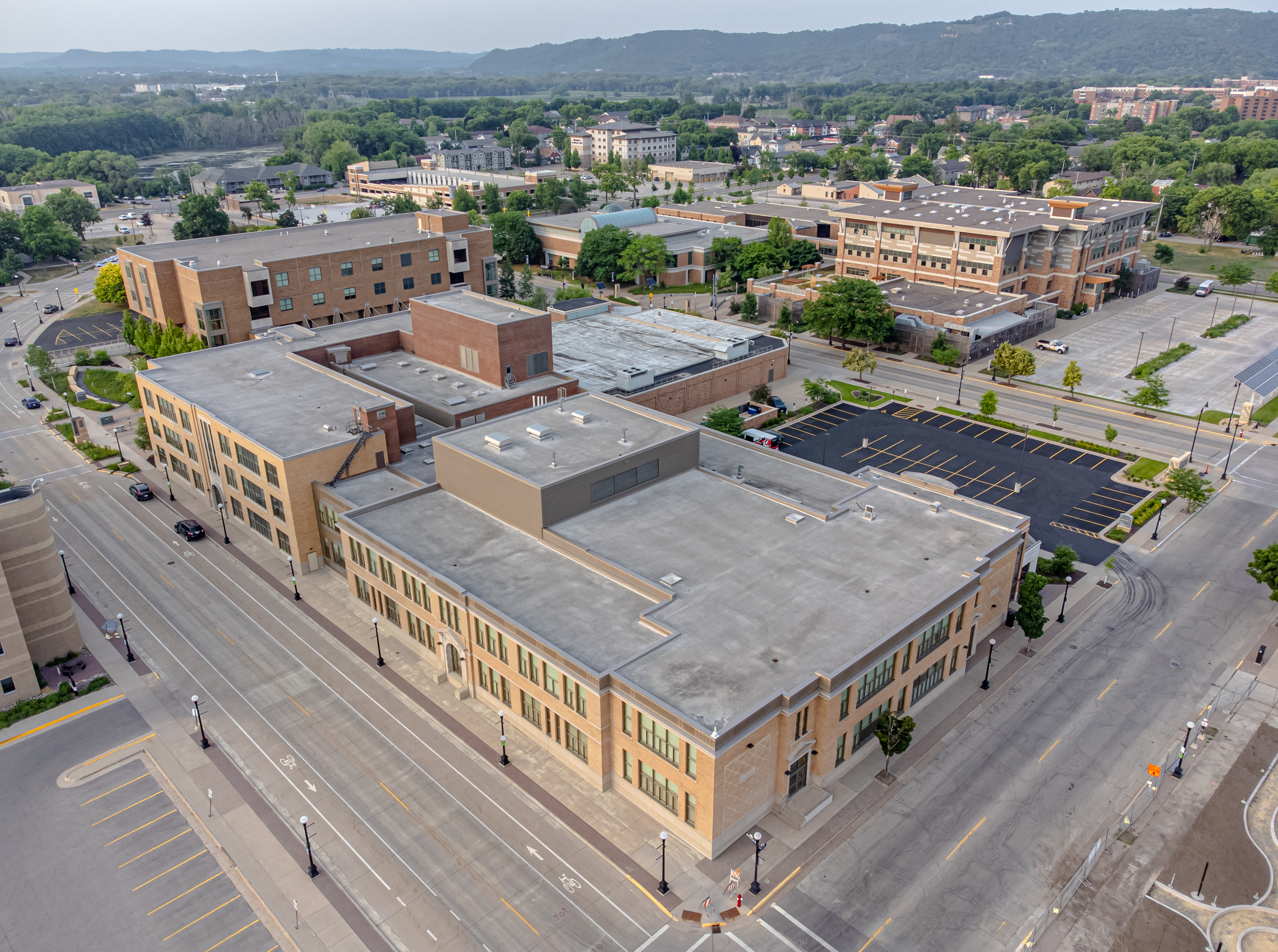
Western Technical College La Crosse

Kumm Center at La Crosse campus

Other locations where classes are offered include:

- Black River Falls
- Independence
- Mauston
- Sparta
- Tomah
- Viroqua

== Academics ==
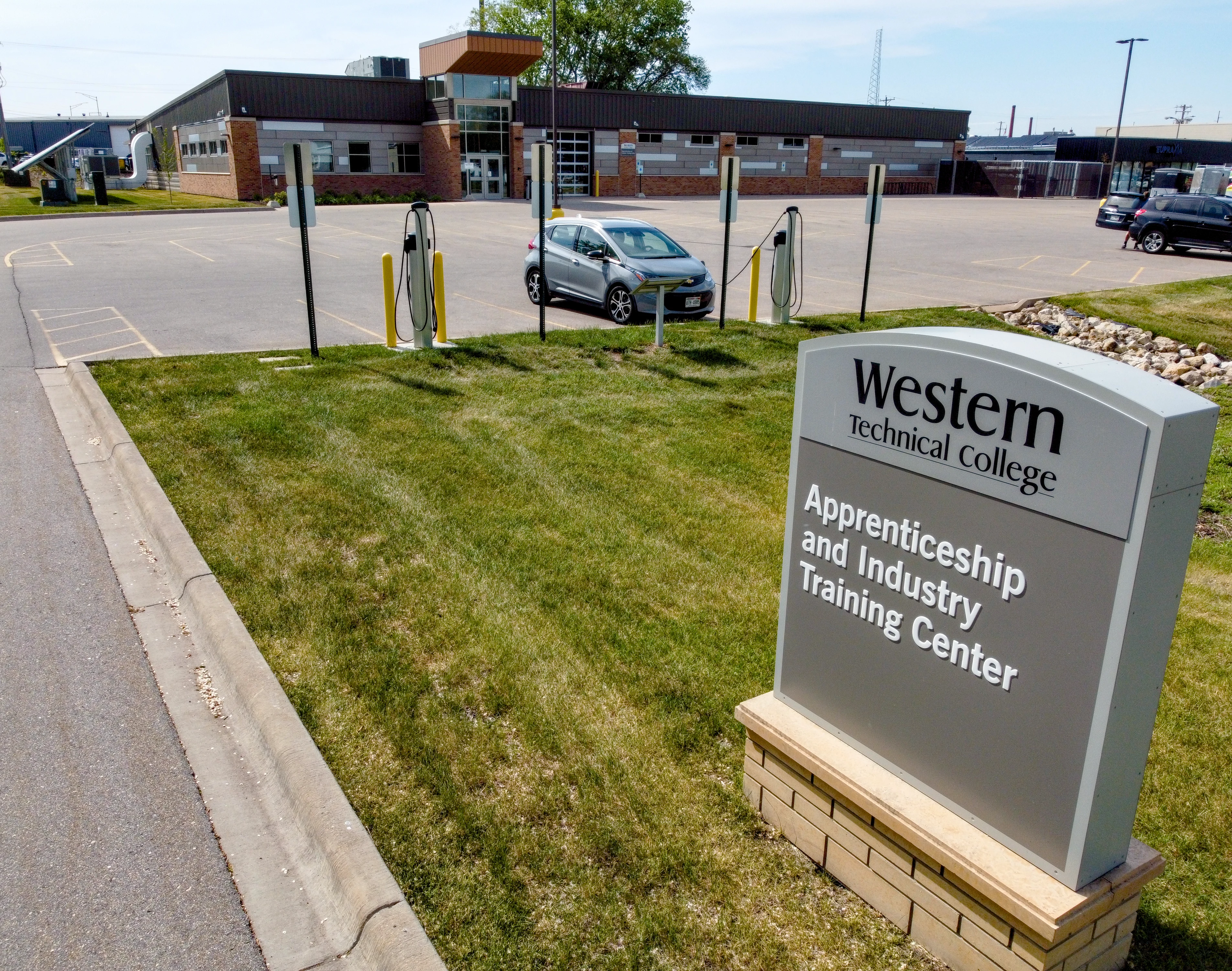
Apprenticeship center

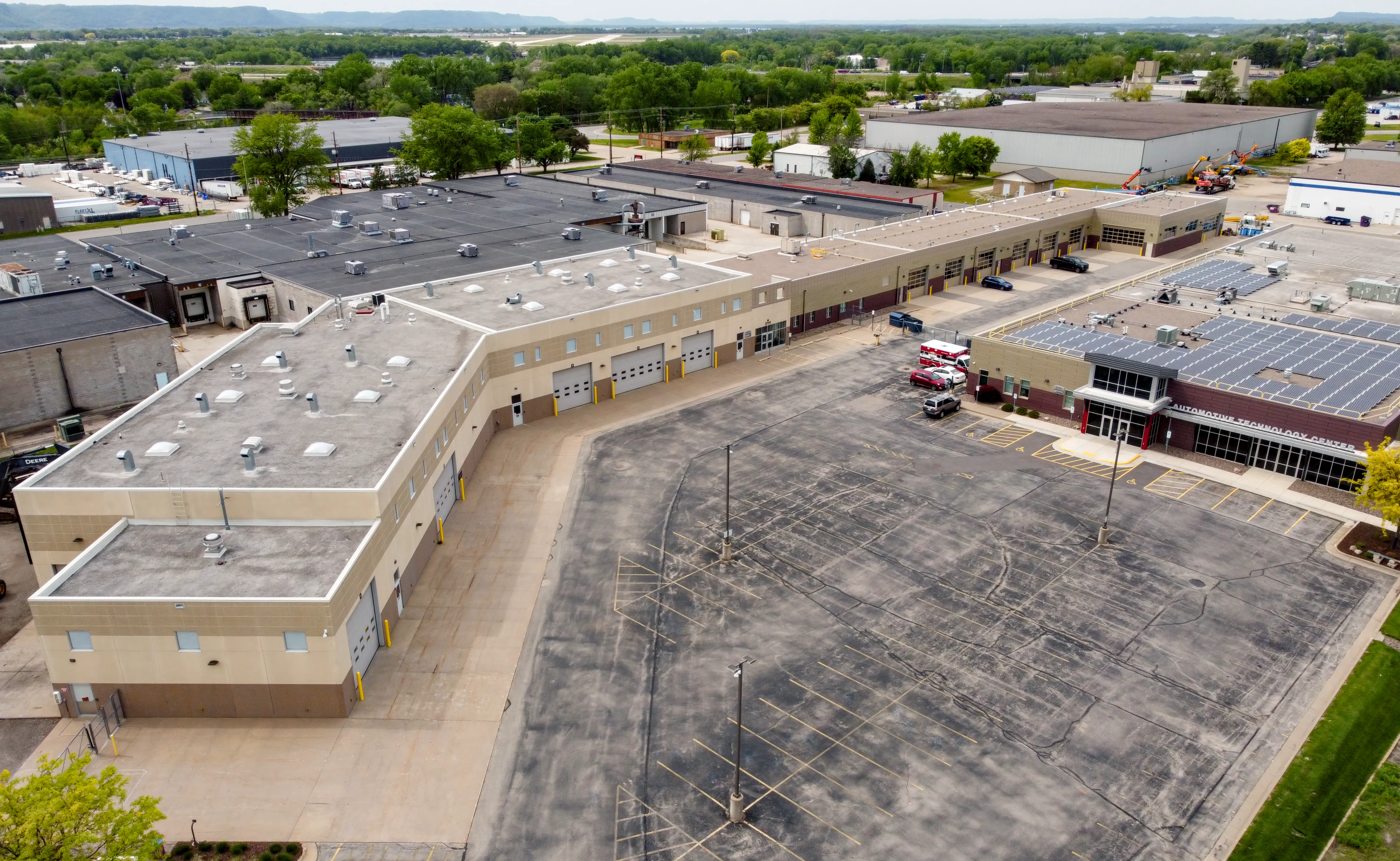
Automotive Technology Center

Western Technical College offers more than 100 programs, providing associate degrees, technical diplomas, and certificates. The college also offers English Language Learners courses, GED/HSED classes, and apprenticeship training.

Western has agreements with several colleges and universities that allow students earn credits towards a bachelor's degree through their programs.

== Athletics ==
Western Technical College's sports teams are called the Cavaliers, who play in red and white colors. The school began athletics in 1967. The Cavaliers are members of the National Junior College Athletic Association and the Minnesota College Athletic Conference. In 2020, the Western Cavaliers Women's Basketball team finished the season 25-6 and won the NJCAA Division III National Championship, the first national title in school history.

== Transportation ==
The main campus of WTC is located northeast of downtown La Crosse and is served by the La Crosse MTU transit system, which offers fare-free service to students. Route 4 provides bus service through campus on 7th Street, connecting to downtown La Crosse and UWL. SMRT buses stop on 7th Street providing regional bus service to Prairie du Chien, Viroqua, Tomah and other destinations.

The bikeshare system DriftCycle has a bikeshare station at the center of campus, one of fifteen across the city.

== See also ==
- University of Wisconsin–La Crosse
- Viterbo University
- Career and technical education
