= Wisconsin's 98th Assembly district =

American legislative district in southeast Wisconsin

Wisconsin's 98th State Assembly district
- 2024 map defined in 2023 Wisc. Act 94; 2022 map defined in Johnson v. Wisconsin Elections Commission; 2011 map was defined in 2011 Wisc. Act 43
Assemblymember
Jim Piwowarczyk; R–Erin
since January 6, 2025 (1 years)
- Demographics: 92.65% White; 1.09% Black; 2.68% Hispanic; 1.84% Asian; 0.99% Native American; 0.09% Hawaiian/Pacific Islander
- Population (2020) • Voting age: 59,835; 46,126
- Website: Official website
- Notes: Southeast Wisconsin

The 98th Assembly district of Wisconsin is one of 99 districts in the Wisconsin State Assembly. Located in southeastern Wisconsin, the district comprises part of northern Waukesha County and the southeast corner of Washington County. It includes most of the city of Hartford along with the villages of Sussex and Merton. The district also contains the Pike Lake State Park. The district is represented by Republican Jim Piwowarczyk, since January 2025.

The 98th Assembly district is located within Wisconsin's 33rd Senate district, along with the 97th and 99th Assembly districts.

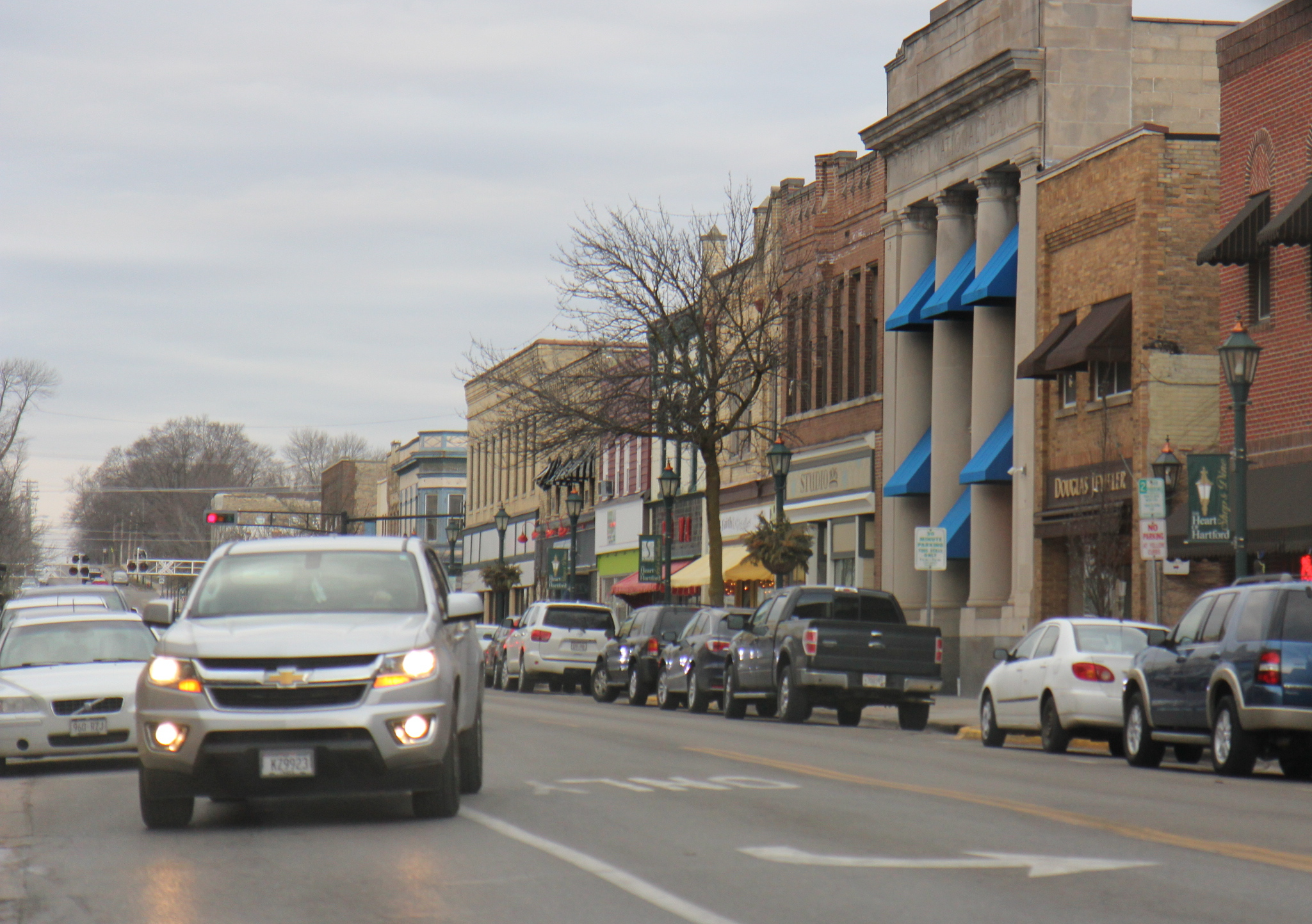
Downtown Hartford

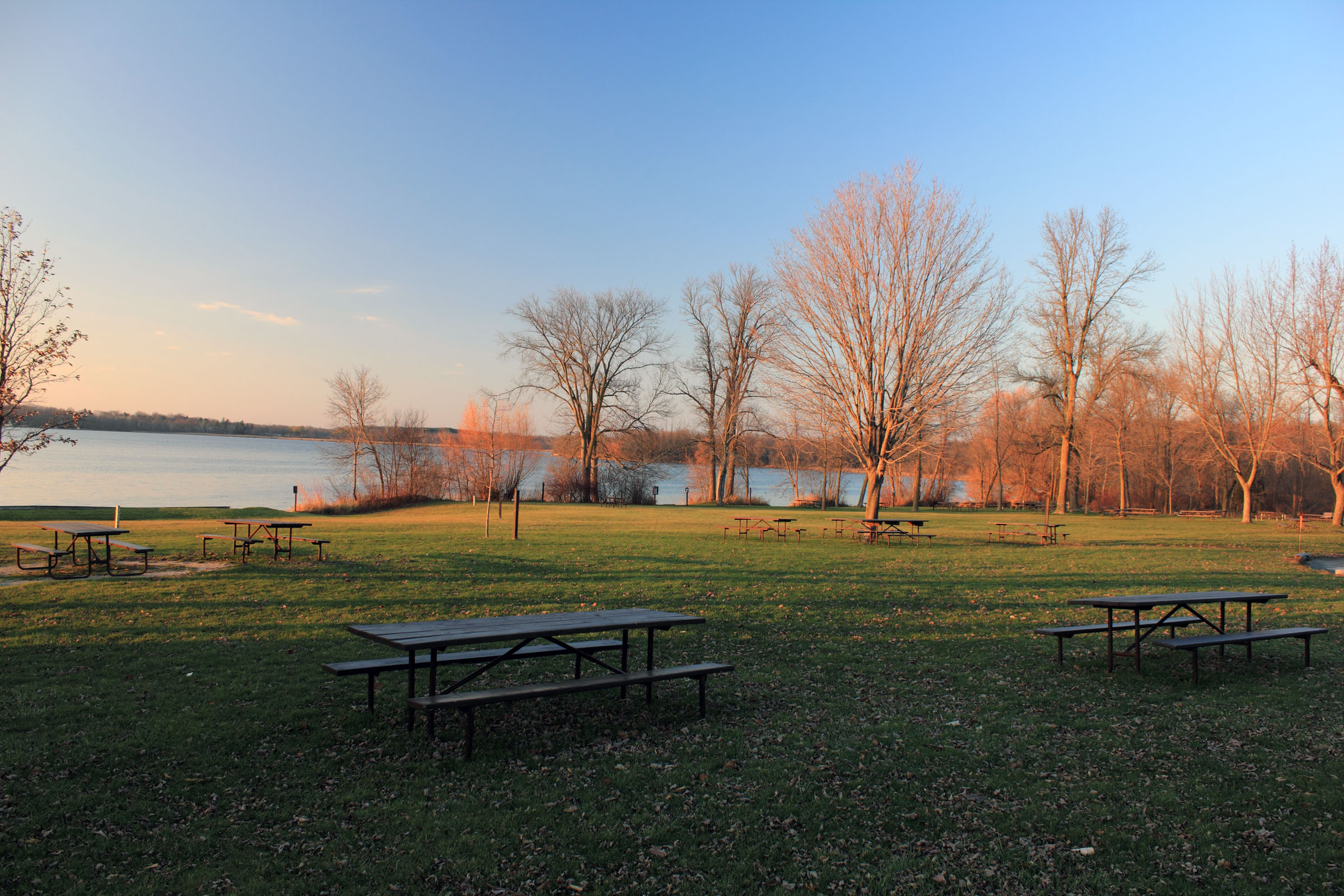
Pike Lake State Park

== List of past representatives ==
List of representatives to the Wisconsin State Assembly from the 98th district
Member	Party	Residence	Counties represented	Term start	Term end	Ref.
District created
Edward Jackamonis	Dem.	Waukesha	Waukesha	January 1, 1973	January 3, 1983	
Charles Chvala	Dem.	Madison	Dane	January 3, 1983	January 7, 1985	
Peggy Rosenzweig	Rep.	Wauwatosa	Milwaukee, Waukesha	January 7, 1985	January 4, 1993	
Marc C. Duff	Rep.	New Berlin	Milwaukee, Waukesha	January 4, 1993	January 6, 2003	
Scott Jensen	Rep.	Waukesha	Waukesha	January 6, 2003	March 21, 2006	
--Vacant--			Waukesha	March 21, 2006	January 1, 2007	
Rich Zipperer	Rep.	Pewaukee	Waukesha	January 1, 2007	January 3, 2011	
Paul Farrow	Rep.	Pewaukee	Waukesha	January 3, 2011	January 7, 2013	
--Vacant--			Waukesha	January 7, 2013	April 16, 2013	
Adam Neylon	Rep.	Pewaukee	Waukesha	April 16, 2013	January 6, 2025	
Jim Piwowarczyk	Rep.	Erin	Washington, Waukesha	January 6, 2025	Current	
