= Rich Zipperer =

American politician (born 1974)

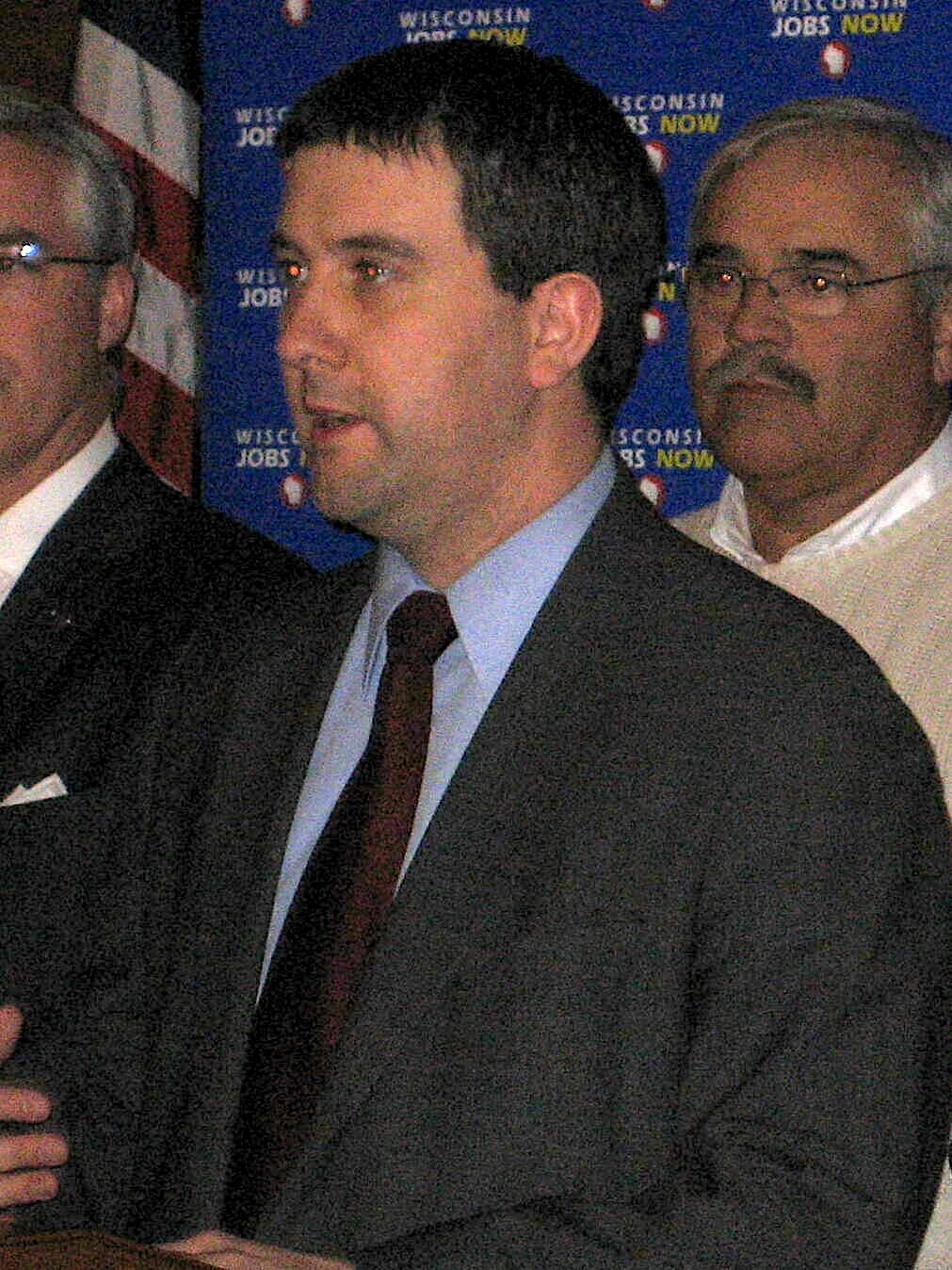
- Zipperer in 2009

Member of the Wisconsin Senate from the 33rd district
- In office January 3, 2011 – August 5, 2012
- Preceded by: Ted Kanavas
- Succeeded by: Paul Farrow

Member of the Wisconsin State Assembly from the 98th district
- In office January 1, 2007 – January 3, 2011
- Preceded by: Scott Jensen
- Succeeded by: Paul Farrow

Personal details
- Born: April 16, 1974 (age 52) Green Bay, Wisconsin
- Party: Republican
- Spouse: Rita
- Education: St. Norbert College, George Washington University, Georgetown University Law Center
- Profession: Attorney

Richard Albert Zipperer (born April 16, 1974) is an American lawyer and Republican politician from Waukesha County, Wisconsin. He served two years in the Wisconsin Senate (2011–2012) and four years in the state Assembly (2007–2011). He resigned his Senate seat to join the gubernatorial staff of Wisconsin governor Scott Walker, serving three years as deputy chief of staff and then another three years as chief of staff. In 2018, Walker appointed Zipperer to the Public Service Commission of Wisconsin, where he served for a year. Since 2019, he has been employed as district chief of staff for U.S. representative Bryan Steil.

== Early life, education and career ==
Born in Green Bay, Wisconsin, Zipperer attended both parochial and public schools growing up, graduating from Reedsville Public High School. He graduated magna cum laude from St. Norbert College in De Pere, earned a master's degree from The George Washington University, and earned a law degree from Georgetown University Law Center. He worked for U.S. Congressman Jim Sensenbrenner as his district director and deputy chief of staff.

== Wisconsin Legislature ==
Zipperer was first elected to the Wisconsin State Assembly in 2006.

On November 2, 2010, Zipperer was elected to the Wisconsin State Senate. In August, 2012, Zipperer resigned from the Senate to take a post as deputy chief of staff in the administration of Gov. Scott Walker.

== Personal life ==
Zipperer met his wife, Rita, while attending St. Norbert College in De Pere. She works for Northwestern Mutual Financial Network in Brookfield. They live in Pewaukee, where they are active members of St. Anthony on the Lake Catholic Church.

Zipperer is a member of Whitetails Unlimited. He is also a member of the Pewaukee Chamber of Commerce, a board member for Bethany Christian Services Adoption Agency of Wisconsin, the Brookfield Optimists and the Waukesha County Republican Party.

Wisconsin State Assembly
Preceded by Scott Jensen	Member of the Wisconsin State Assembly from the 98th district January 1, 2007 – January 3, 2011	Succeeded by Paul Farrow
Wisconsin Senate
Preceded by Ted Kanavas	Member of the Wisconsin Senate from the 33rd district January 3, 2011 – August 5, 2012	Succeeded by Paul Farrow
