= Waukesha County Technical College =

Public college in Pewaukee, Wisconsin, US

Coordinates: 43°04′20″N 88°15′21″W

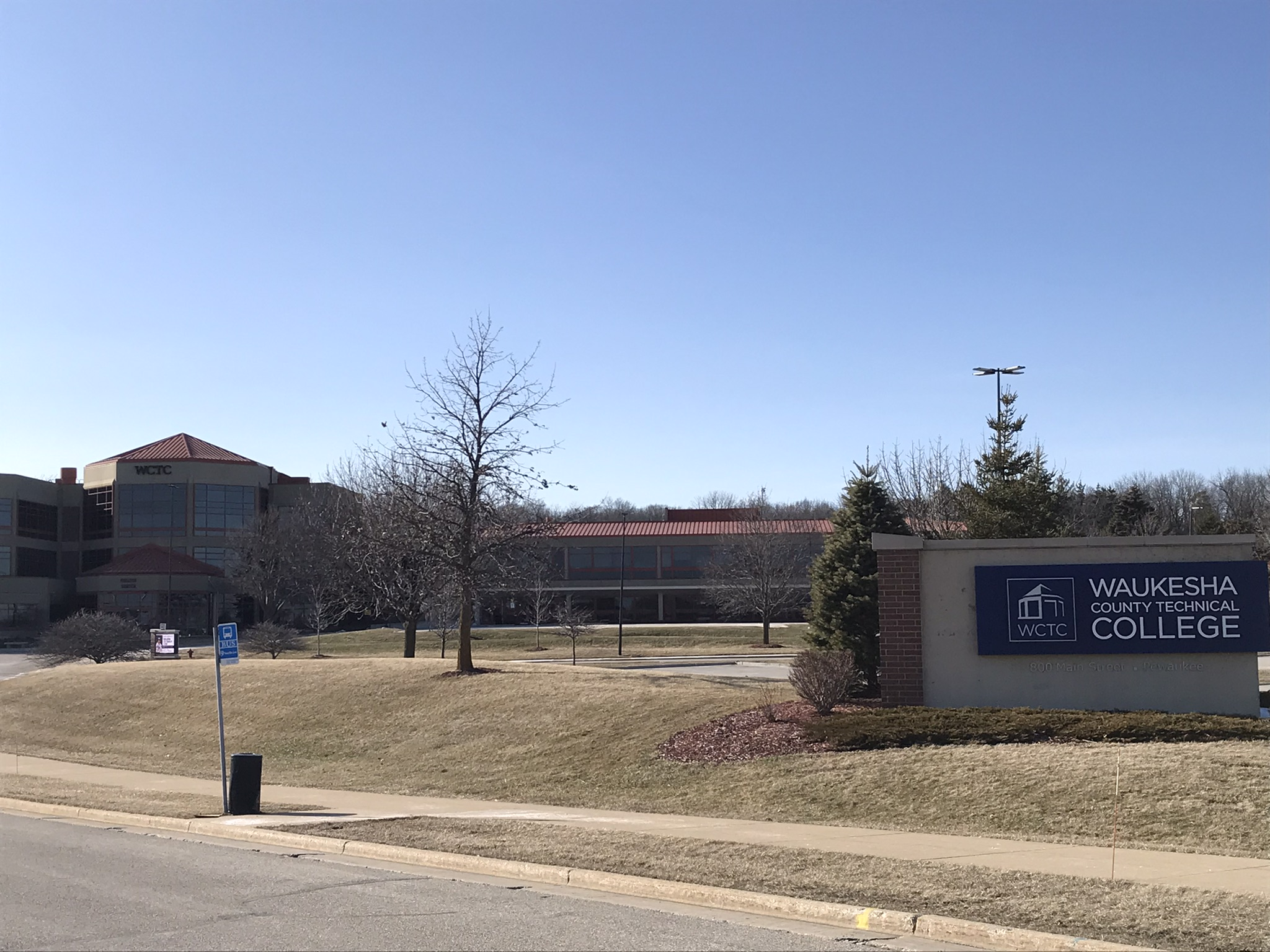
- Type: State Technical College
- Established: 1923; 103 years ago
- President: Richard Barnhouse
- Students: 17,836
- Location: Pewaukee and Waukesha, Wisconsin, United States
- Campus: Urban
- Website: www.wctc.edu

Waukesha County Technical College (WCTC) is a public community college in Waukesha County, Wisconsin, United States. The main campus is in Pewaukee, with a satellite campus in downtown Waukesha. It is a member of the Wisconsin Technical College System.

== Accreditation ==
WCTC is accredited by the Higher Learning Commission (HLC) and is a member of the North Central Association of Colleges and Schools.

== Notable alumni ==
- Paul Farrow, businessman and legislator
- Ben Rothwell, professional mixed martial artist, current UFC Heavyweight
- Keri Craig-Lee, Australian fashion designer.
- Justin Aprahamian, James Beard Award winning chef
