= Patricia Mackinnon =

- Born: Una Patricia Bell; 24 July 1911; Brisbane, Queensland
- Died: 17 May 2009 (aged 97)
- Occupations: Vice-President and President of the Royal Children's Hospital, Melbourne and a national councillor for the Australian Hospitals Association

Dame Una Patricia Mackinnon DBE (née Bell; 24 July 1911 – 17 May 2009) was Vice-President and President of the Royal Children's Hospital, Melbourne and a national councillor for the Australian Hospitals Association.

== Personal life ==
Una Patricia Bell was born in Brisbane, Queensland as the daughter of Ernest Thomas and Pauline Eva (née Taylor) Bell. She was educated at St Margaret's Anglican Girls' School. She married Alistair Mackinnon on 17 December 1936; they had two children.

== Career ==
In 1948, Mackinnon became a member of the committee of management for the Royal Children's Hospital (RCH), Melbourne. She served in several offices before being elected vice-president from 1957 to 1965, and president 1965–79, succeeding Dame Elisabeth Murdoch.

In 1968 she began as chairman of the RCH Research Foundation, a position she held until 1986 and, from 1951 to 1965, served as president of the Auxiliaries. She was a federal and state councillor of the Australian Hospitals Association for many years.

Her links to the RCH go back to her grandmother-in-law, Lady Emily Mackinnon, who served on the committee of management (1888–1922). Her mother-in-law, Mrs. Hilda Mackinnon, was elected president of the committee of management from 1923 to 1933. The Mackinnon School of Nursing is named in their honour.

== Death ==
Dame Patricia Mackinnon died on 17 May 2009 at the age of 97.

== Honours ==
Mackinnon was created a Commander of the Order of the British Empire (CBE) in 1972 and a Dame Commander of the order (DBE) in 1977, in recognition of distinguished service to the community in hospital administration.
