= Blackhawk Technical College =

Technical school in Wisconsin

Coordinates: 42°35′36.1″N 89°00′57.4″W

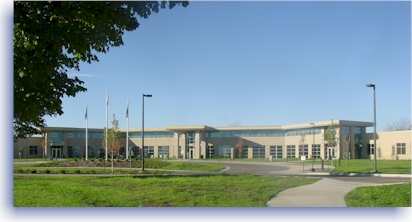
Blackhawk Technical College: Central Campus

Blackhawk Technical College (commonly Blackhawk Tech) is a technical school in Rock County, Wisconsin and a component of the Wisconsin Technical College System. The main campus lies between the cities of Beloit and Janesville; there are also several other locations.

Blackhawk Technical College is accredited by the Higher Learning Commission of the North Central Association of Colleges and Schools (NCA). The two primary counties in Wisconsin served by Blackhawk Technical College are Rock and Green Counties.

== Overview ==
The Blackhawk Technical College (BTC) Central Campus is located in-between the cities of Beloit and Janesville on approximately 80 acres (32 ha) of partially wooded rolling prairie. BTC offers approximately 50 programs leading toward an associate degree, technical diploma, certificate, or apprenticeship. In addition to the Central Campus, classes are also offered at the Monroe Campus in Monroe, Wisconsin, the Center for Transportation Studies in Janesville, Wisconsin, as well as other locations in Beloit, Brodhead, and Janesville.

The college serves approximately 14,000 students annually – about 6,000 credit and 8,000 non-credit students.

Blackhawk Technical College ranks as one of the best schools for Associates of Technology in HVAC.

The college also houses a middle college on campus, Rock University High School.
