= Keri Craig-Lee =

Australian fashion designer

- Born: 4 March 1958 (age 68); Brisbane, Queensland, Australia
- Education: St Margaret's Anglican Girls School, Waukesha County Technical College
- Occupation: Fashion Designer
- Years active: 1978–present
- Website: www.kericraig.com.au

Keri Craig-Lee OAM (born 4 March 1958) is an Australian fashion designer and retailer. She was the first inductee into the National Retail Association (formerly the Retailers Association of Queensland – RAQ) Hall of Fame in 1987 at age 28, and remains a member of the Federal Executive Committee of Fashion Industries of Australia.

== Early life and education ==
Craig-Lee was raised in Brisbane, Queensland. Her parents, Peter and Dianne Craig, founded House of Craig following success managing the Fifth Avenue brand and continue to run the Keri Craig Emporium in the Brisbane Arcade with her brother Jason.

She grew up in the Brisbane suburb of Ascot graduated St Margaret's Anglican Girls School in 1975, and in 1976 obtained a Diploma in Fashion Design and Marketing from Waukesha County Technical College, Wisconsin, United States.

== Personal life ==
Craig-Lee married Trevor Lee, Australian Country Choice chairman and director of the Lee Group Pty Ltd in 1986. The couple have two children.

== Career ==
In 1977 Craig-Lee established the eponymous fashion label, Keri Craig, and opened boutiques in Brisbane and Sydney, with her label becoming available throughout Australia and overseas.

In 1984, she designed and coordinated Sir Elton John's Sydney wedding to Renate Blauel.

With her husband, Keri established Australian Country Choice in 1995, one of Australia's largest meat supply chains, as well as Keri Lee Charters and Sutherland Aviation.

== Awards ==
Craig-Lee was inducted into the RAQ Hall of Fame at the age of 28, following three RAQ 'supreme' awards in 1981, 1982 and 1986. She was also the first Queenslander to be nominated for the FIA Australian Fashion Award.

In 2017, Craig-Lee was awarded the Medal of the Order of Australia (OAM) for her service to the clothing manufacturing sector, business and the community.

Craig-Lee was named as a Queensland Great in 2024.

In 2025, she was inducted into the Queensland Business Leaders Hall of Fame in recognition for her distinguished, pioneering contributions to the Australian fashion industry and sustained business leadership excellence.

== Publications ==
In 2017, Craig-Lee released her first book, Keri Craig: the label, the lady, the lifestyle, a pictorial biography chronicling her career spanning almost 40 years and featuring contributions from politicians, personalities and photographers.
