= Mid-State Technical College =

Public college in central Wisconsin, US

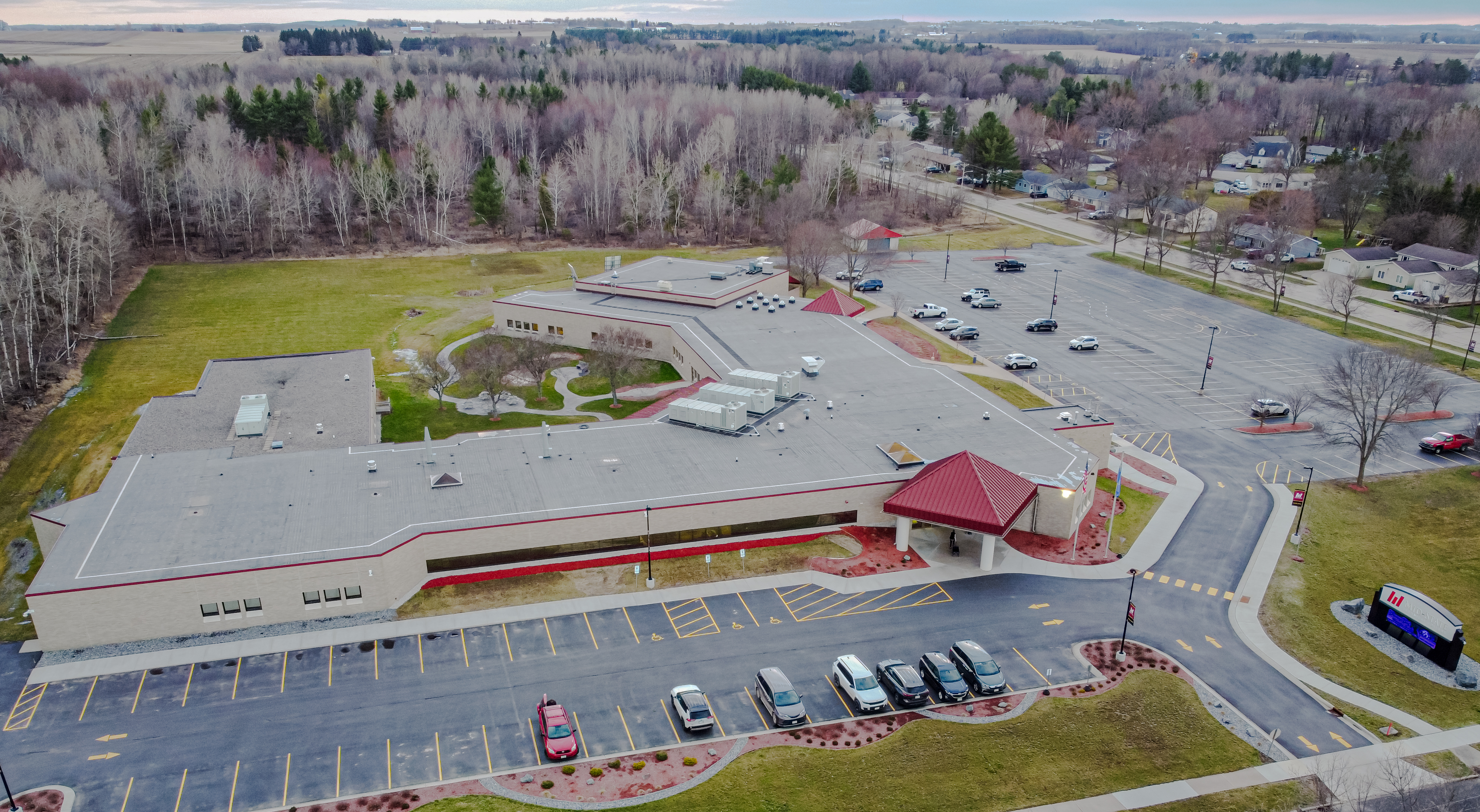
- Type: Public technical college
- Established: 1913
- Parent institution: Wisconsin Technical College System
- President: Shelly Mondeik
- Students: 8,000 (as of 2018)
- Location: Wisconsin Rapids, Marshfield, Stevens Point, Wisconsin, United States
- Campus: Urban
- Website: mstc.edu

Mid-State Technical College (Mid-State) is a public technical college in central Wisconsin with major campuses in Adams, Marshfield, Stevens Point, and Wisconsin Rapids. It is part of the Wisconsin Technical College System.

The college is accredited by the Higher Learning Commission.
