= St Margaret's Anglican Girls' School =

St Margaret's Anglican Girls School

Location
- Ascot, Queensland; Australia
- Coordinates: 27°25′48″S 153°2′57″E

Information
- Type: Independent, day, boarding
- Motto: Per Volar Sunata ("Born To Fly Upwards"); Dante Purgatorio XII 94-96
- Denomination: Anglican
- Established: 1895
- Principal: Ros Curtis
- Grades: P–12
- Gender: Girls
- Enrolment: ~810
- Colours: Navy, white and brown
- Website: stmargarets.qld.edu.au

St Margaret's Anglican Girls School is an Australian private Anglican day and boarding school for girls. The school is in Ascot, an inner-northern suburb of Brisbane, Queensland.

The school was founded in 1895 by the religious sisters of the Society of the Sacred Advent. It has a non-selective enrolment policy and currently enrolls approximately 1175 students from Pre-Preparatory to Year 12, including 185 boarders from Years 5 to 12. St Margaret's has eight houses: Chaucer, Bede, Herrick, Kendall, Tennyson, Milton, Spenser and Lawson.

St Margaret's is affiliated with the Association of Heads of Independent Schools of Australia (AHISA), the Junior School Heads Association of Australia (JSHAA), the Australian Boarding Schools' Association (ABSA), the Alliance of Girls' Schools Australasia (AGSA), and is a founding member of the Queensland Girls' Secondary Schools Sports Association (QGSSSA).

== History ==
In 1895, the religious sisters of the Society of the Sacred Advent opened a boarding school for girls at Eton High School, a former boys' school in Nundah. The school was on land bounded by Bishop Street, Buckland Road, Wand Street and Olive Street. Sister Emma was the sister-in-charge and Isabelle Caine was the headmistress. In 1907, the school moved to Toorak House in Hamilton, Juliet Lyon (1907–1917) replaced Caine, and the school roll grew to 35 pupils.

As well as the usual lessons, students participated in tennis, rowing, basketball and swimming. Three years later the school moved again to Albion Heights. It was housed in Donatello, a home built in the 1880s for Patrick Durack. The building was renamed St Margaret's House and the school's name changed to the Church of England High School. Two years later the school became known as St Margaret's Church of England Girls’ School and has remained on this site ever since. Donatello is still in use today as the community house for the sisters.

By 1910 there were 47 boarders and when the University of Queensland opened in 1911, two St Margaret's girls were among its first students. Lyon resigned in 1917 and was the last lay Headmistress until 1978. It was during Lyon's time that the School motto, Per Volar Sunata (Born to Fly Upwards), came into being and the middy uniform was introduced.

Under the leadership of Sister Teresa (1918–25) the school grew and the adjoining property, Avoca, was acquired in 1918 to provide extra accommodation. It was originally named Mooloomburram when it was built in 1886 by Andrew Petrie. Sister Teresa introduced the house system, a student representative school council and the Dalton method of education. Sister Elisabeth (1925–1936) embarked on a building program, including the West Wing with classrooms, dormitories and dining room; the Darnell Art and Music buildings and the swimming pool. After Sister Bernadine (1937–1939), Sister Mary (1940–1964) led the school through the years of World War II and the resulting changes to School life – closures, reduced enrolments, rationing and shortages.

After the war, a new assembly hall (Eton Hall), extra classrooms and dormitories in East Wing; a gymnasium; the school chapel; Dalhousie classrooms and a boarders’ recreation block and library were erected. The school continued to grow under the leadership of both Sister Jean-Marie (1965–1970) and Sister Helen (1971–1977). The school celebrated its 75th anniversary in 1970 with the opening of Toorak and its library, staff room and science laboratories. In 1977 the sisters took the decision to appoint a lay Headmistress, while still retaining ownership and guidance of the school. Margaret Kugleman (1978–1982) was followed by Evelyn Heath (1982–1993), Mary Hutchings (1993–1995) and Judith Hill (1995–1996). The Avoca and Jackson Wings were built at this time to provide additional classrooms.

A separate primary school building, Chaseley Wing, opened in 1992 to accommodate growing primary enrolments. It is named after Sister Chaseley Anne who was in charge of the boarding house from 1979 to 1990.

In 1995, the school's centenary year, the Philip Harris Sports Centre was built. It is supplemented by outdoor facilities at Windsor Park and a rowing centre at Breakfast Creek.

An art room and music block were built in the 1930s, and in 2003 a new arts centre was built. This has three art studios, pottery area and a display gallery.

The Eunice Science and Resource Centre was opened in 2012, named after Mother Eunice.

In 2020, the school built a new sports precinct. This has a water-polo sized heated swimming pool with two 50m lanes, tennis courts with lights, gymnasium with an oak sprung floor, a strength and conditioning gym, an indoor climbing wall featuring seven belay stations and 76m2 of climbing, a dedicated ergometer room to support rowing and modern health and physical education classrooms. The rebuilt gymnasium within the sports precinct took Philip Harris' name again and is called the Philip Harris Gym.

== Curriculum ==
In the secondary school, girls in Years 7 and 8 study English, Mathematics, Science, Humanities, Health and Physical Education, Religious and Values Education, Drama, Visual Art, Music, French or Mandarin, Science of Learning (Year 7) and Digital Technologies (Year 8).

Students in Years 9 and 10 choose from a large number of electives. Compulsory subjects are English, Mathematics, Science, Health and Physical Education and Religious and Values Education and History.

In Years 11 and 12 students choose one of the following QCE pathways: Australian Tertiary Admissions Rank (ATAR) pathway or Portfolio Pathway.

== Notable alumnae ==
- Lily Alton-Triggs – Australian representative rower
- Bronte Barratt – Commonwealth and World Record Holder in Swimming
- Mel Buttle – comedian, television and radio presenter and writer
- Jennifer Byrne – Director of Biobanking, NSW Health Pathology and Professor of Molecular Oncology, The University of Sydney
- Margaret Cameron AM – academic librarian and ornithologist
- Keri Craig-Lee OAM – Fashion Designer and Retailer for the Keri Craig Label
- Desley Deacon – historian, biographer and academic
- Madeleine Edmunds – Olympic rower
- Brittany Elmslie – Olympic gold medallist in swimming
- CJ Hendry – artist
- Emma Jackson – triathlete
- Sally Kehoe – Olympic finalist in rowing
- Dame Patricia Mackinnon, DBE – appointed a Dame Commander of the Order of the British Empire for service to the Royal Children's Hospital.
- Daphne Mayo – Sculptor
- Una Prentice – first woman to graduate from the Faculty of Law at the University of Queensland
- Isobel Roe – ABC journalist
- Emily Seebohm – Olympic gold medalist and former world record holder in swimming
- Geraldine Turner OAM – actress

== See also ==
- List of schools in Queensland
- List of boarding schools
