= Adam Neylon =

American politician (born 1984)

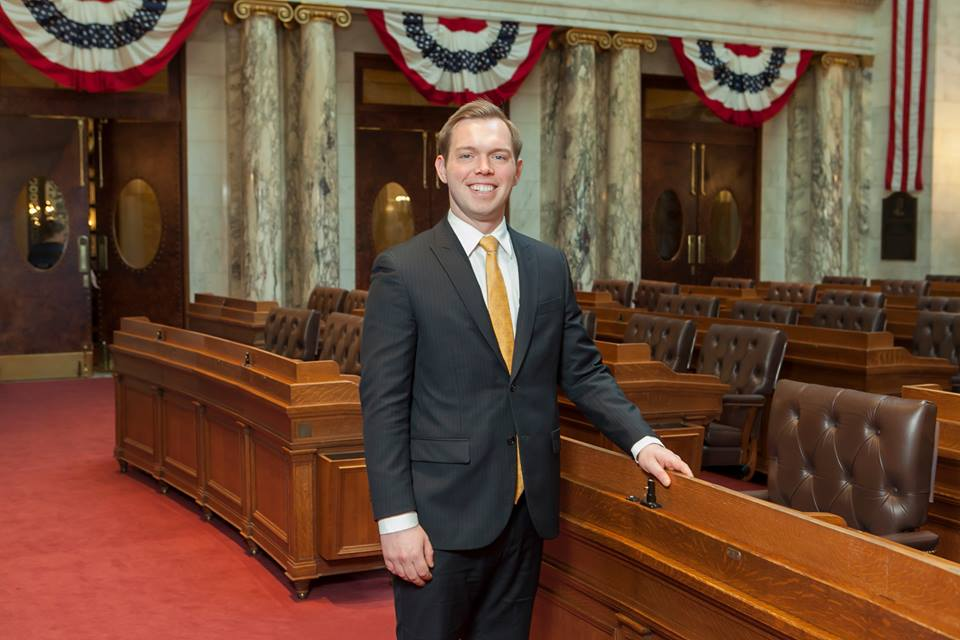

Member of the Wisconsin State Assembly
- Incumbent
- Assumed office January 6, 2025
- Preceded by: Dave Maxey
- Constituency: 15th district
- In office April 16, 2013 – January 6, 2025
- Preceded by: Paul Farrow
- Succeeded by: Jim Piwowarczyk
- Constituency: 98th district

Personal details
- Born: Adam Thomas Baumann-Neylon; December 30, 1984 (age 41) Elgin, Illinois, U.S.
- Party: Republican
- Spouse: Hannah
- Children: 3
- Education: Carroll University (BA)
- Occupation: business owner, politician
- Website: Official website; Campaign website

Adam Thomas Neylon (born December 30, 1984) is an American small business owner and Republican politician from Waukesha County, Wisconsin. He is a member of the Wisconsin State Assembly, representing Wisconsin's 15th Assembly district since 2025; he previously represented the 98th Assembly district from 2013 to 2025. Earlier in his career, he served as a legislative staffer for U.S. representative Jim Sensenbrenner. Neylon's birth name was Adam Thomas Baumann-Neylon, but switched to utilizing the abbreviated name as an adult.

== Early life and education ==
Neylon was born in Elgin, Illinois, and raised in West Dundee, Illinois. He attended and graduated from Harry D. Jacobs High School in Algonquin, Illinois. After high school, he attended Carroll University, in Waukesha, Wisconsin, and graduated with a degree in political science in 2008. At Carroll, he played second base on the baseball team.

== Early political career ==
While in college, Neylon became involved in politics with the Republican Party of Wisconsin as a youth organizer for Waukesha County. In January 2008, he was also hired as a district office staff assistant for U.S. representative Jim Sensenbrenner. Neylon decided to remain in the Waukesha area after earning his bachelor's degree in 2008, and remained on Sensenbrenner's staff until the summer of 2010.

In 2010, Neylon opened his own commercial window cleaning company. That fall, he was also hired by the Republican Party of Wisconsin to work as field director for Waukesha County in the 2010 election campaign. After the 2010 election, Neylon was hired as a legislative aide to state representative Bill Kramer, and worked as a policy assistant on the Republican Assembly majority leadership staff.

== Public office ==
Neylon made his first bid for elected office in a 2013 special election for Wisconsin State Assembly, after the 98th Assembly district was vacated by Paul Farrow's election to the state Senate. Neylon declared his candidacy for the expected special election before Farrow had even formally vacated the office. He faced a competitive primary in the heavily Republican district, his four opponents included Edward Baumann, the retiring Pewaukee police chief, and Jeanne Tarantino, the former chief of staff to the lieutenant governor. In the February 2013 special primary, Neylon prevailed by the narrow margin of 29 votes over his nearest opponent, Baumann. Neylon was unopposed at the April special election, and was sworn in as a state representative on April 16, 2013.

After his victory in the special primary, the conservative website Right Wisconsin said Neylon was poised to become a rising star in Madison. After taking office in the 101st Wisconsin Legislature, Neylon immediately took an active role in the debates among the Republican majority. During the 2013–2015 state budget debate, he championed issues like tax cuts, reduced long-term borrowing, and fought against DNA collection upon arrest. According to journalist Steven Walters, he was one of the GOP "Young Guns" that helped dictate final budget deals during that session. Neylon was selected to receive the Bowhay Institute for Legislative Leadership Development fellowship with the Council of State Governments in 2014. In his first term, Neylon was part of the class of 2014, making him the only freshman Republican selected from Wisconsin that year.

Neylon was re-elected without opposition in 2014, 2016, and 2018. At the start of his second term, he was appointed chairman of the Assembly Committee on Jobs and the Economy, and chaired that committee for the next three terms. As chair of that committee, he was an ex officio member of the state's Small Business Regulatory Review Board, which has broad authority to review and challenge state regulations.

During the 2015–2016 legislative term, four bills authored by Neylon were passed and signed into law—the GPS Privacy Act, The Parent-Based School Accountability Act, the Wisconsin Robotics League Participation Grant Program, and the Department of Children and Families Modernization Act. The GPS Privacy Act made it a crime for someone to place a global positioning system (GPS) device on someone's vehicle without their consent. The Parent-Based School Accountability Act requires Wisconsin schools to post a link on their website to the School Report Card generated by the Wisconsin Department of Public Instruction. The Wisconsin Robotics League Participation Grant Program is a participation grant program, where schools are able to apply for up to $5,000 in grants to help pay the cost of having a school affiliated robotics team.

During the 2017–2018 term, two bills authored by Neylon were passed and signed into law—2017 Wisconsin Act 39 and the REINS Act. Act 39 provides that state agency scope statements, which are the first step in the administrative rule-making process, will expire after 30 months, if they are not acted upon. The REINS Act allows Wisconsin citizens more input into the rule-making process, and places the authority to approve rules with implementation costs of $10 million or more in the hands of elected legislators. This law was the first of its kind to be passed by a state legislature.

In that same term, Neylon, as chair of the Committee on Jobs and the Economy, helped guide the Foxconn Incentive Bill through the Assembly committee process, enabling the establishment of the Wisconn Valley Science and Technology Park. He also authored the substitute amendment to the bill that was adopted by the full Assembly.

In 2020, in the midst of the COVID-19 pandemic, Neylon faced a primary challenge from health care consultant Rob Ochoa, but easily prevailed and went on to win his fifth term.

Wisconsin underwent redistricting in 2022, and Neylon's district was slightly changed, shifting south to comprise more of the city of Waukesha. Under the reconfigured district, Neylon faced his first ever Democratic opponent, when he was challenged by civil engineer Christina Barry of Waukesha. Neylon won his sixth term, receiving 59% of the vote.

Another, more dramatic redistricting occurred in 2024, after the Wisconsin Supreme Court struck down the previous legislative map. Under the new map, Neylon's Pewaukee-based district shifted out of the city of Waukesha again, and instead shifted east into the city of Brookfield; the district also was renumbered to the 15th district. In the 2024 election, he faced Democratic candidate Sarah Harrison, a small business owner from Pewaukee. Neylon won his seventh term, again receiving about 59% of the vote.

In the 2026 Assembly election, Neylon faces a challenge from Democratic candidate Stephen Tryon, a U.S. Army veteran, author, and former business executive. During 2026, however, Waukesha County executive Paul Farrow died of cancer, and a special election was called to fill the vacancy caused by his death. While continuing to run for re-election in the Assembly, Neylon announced that he would also run in the special election for county executive, with the special primary scheduled to take place just two weeks after the November 2026 general election. If elected as county executive, Neylon would have to resign his seat in the Assembly. At least one other incumbent legislator, Republican state senator Chris Kapenga, is also running in the Waukesha County special election.

== Personal life and family ==
Adam Neylon was one of two children born to Thom and Conni Baumann-Neylon.

Adam Neylon lives in Pewaukee, Wisconsin, with his wife Hannah and their three children.

== Electoral history ==
=== Wisconsin Assembly, 98th district (2013–2022) ===
| Year | Election | Date | Elected | | | | Defeated | | | | Total | Plurality |
|---|---|---|---|---|---|---|---|---|---|---|---|---|
| 2013 (special) | Special; Primary | Feb. 19 | Adam Neylon | Republican | 2,006 | 38.27% | Edward Baumann | Rep. | 1,977 | 37.71% | 5,242 | 29 |
| 2013 (special) | Special; Primary | Feb. 19 | Adam Neylon | Republican | 2,006 | 38.27% | Jeanne Tarantino | Rep. | 774 | 14.77% | 5,242 | 29 |
| 2013 (special) | Special; Primary | Feb. 19 | Adam Neylon | Republican | 2,006 | 38.27% | Matt Morzy | Rep. | 253 | 4.83% | 5,242 | 29 |
| 2013 (special) | Special; Primary | Feb. 19 | Adam Neylon | Republican | 2,006 | 38.27% | Todd A. Greenwald | Rep. | 221 | 4.22% | 5,242 | 29 |
| 2013 (special) | Special | Apr. 2 | Adam Neylon | Republican | 6,006 | 99.32% | --unopposed-- | | | | 6,047 | 5,965 |
| 2014 | General | Nov. 4 | Adam Neylon (inc) | Republican | 21,357 | 98.64% | --unopposed-- | | | | 21,652 | 21,062 |
| 2016 | General | Nov. 8 | Adam Neylon (inc) | Republican | 25,592 | 98.39% | --unopposed-- | | | | 26,011 | 25,173 |
| 2018 | General | Nov. 6 | Adam Neylon (inc) | Republican | 23,005 | 97.11% | --unopposed-- | | | | 23,689 | 22,321 |
| 2020 | Primary | Aug. 11 | Adam Neylon (inc) | Republican | 4,941 | 73.32% | Rob Ochoa | Rep. | 1,788 | 26.53% | 6,739 | 3,153 |
| 2020 | General | Nov. 3 | Adam Neylon (inc) | Republican | 28,221 | 96.93% | --unopposed-- | | | | 29,114 | 27,328 |
| 2022 | General | Nov. 8 | Adam Neylon (inc) | Republican | 16,439 | 59.22% | Christina Barry | Dem. | 11,304 | 40.72% | 27,757 | 5,135 |

=== Wisconsin Assembly, 15th district (2024, 2026) ===
| Year | Election | Date | Elected | | | | Defeated | | | | Total | Plurality |
|---|---|---|---|---|---|---|---|---|---|---|---|---|
| 2024 | General | Nov. 5 | Adam Neylon | Republican | 22,573 | 59.07% | Sarah Harrison | Dem. | 15,598 | 40.82% | 38,215 | 6,975 |

Wisconsin State Assembly
| Preceded by Paul Farrow | Member of the Wisconsin State Assembly from the 98th district April 16, 2013 – January 6, 2025 | Succeeded by Jim Piwowarczyk |
| Preceded by Dave Maxey | Member of the Wisconsin State Assembly from the 15th district January 6, 2025 – present | Incumbent |
