= Paul Farrow =

American politician (1964–2026)

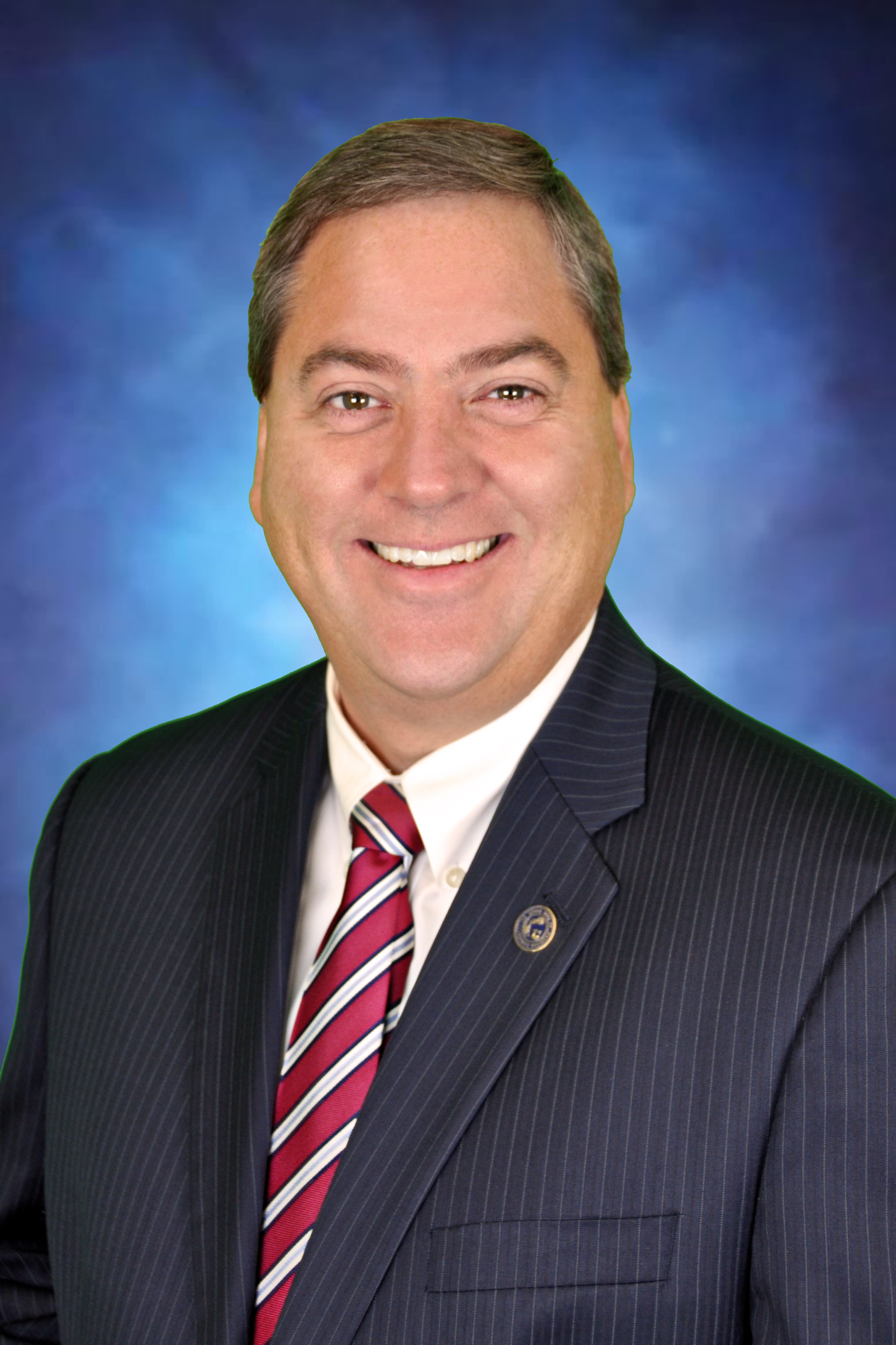

County Executive of Waukesha County
- In office April 21, 2015 – July 7, 2026
- Preceded by: Daniel P. Vrakas
- Succeeded by: Thomas Farley (interim)

Chair of the Wisconsin Republican Party
- In office August 22, 2021 – December 10, 2022
- Preceded by: Andrew Hitt
- Succeeded by: Brian Schimming

Member of the Wisconsin Senate from the 33rd district
- In office December 14, 2012 – July 17, 2015
- Preceded by: Rich Zipperer
- Succeeded by: Chris Kapenga

Member of the Wisconsin State Assembly from the 98th district
- In office January 3, 2011 – December 14, 2012
- Preceded by: Rich Zipperer
- Succeeded by: Adam Neylon

Personal details
- Born: July 17, 1964 Milwaukee, Wisconsin, U.S.
- Died: July 7, 2026 (aged 61)
- Party: Republican
- Spouse: Amy A. Vaitl (m. 1987)
- Children: 2
- Parents: John Farrow (father); Margaret Farrow (mother)
- Education: University of Wisconsin, Waukesha; Waukesha County Technical College; Carroll University (BA)
- Website: Campaign website

Paul Farrow (July 17, 1964 – July 7, 2026) was an American businessman and Republican politician from Pewaukee, Wisconsin. He served 11 years as the county executive of Waukesha County, Wisconsin, from 2015 until his death in 2026. Farrow previously served two years each in the Wisconsin Senate (2012–2015) and State Assembly (2011–2012), and was chairman of the Republican Party of Wisconsin from August 2021 through December 2022.

His mother, Margaret Farrow, was the first female lieutenant governor of Wisconsin.

== Early life and career ==
Paul Farrow was born with a twin brother in Milwaukee, Wisconsin, on July 17, 1964. He was raised and educated in Milwaukee, graduating from Milwaukee's Marquette University High School in 1982. After attending the University of Wisconsin–Milwaukee at Waukesha, Farrow transferred to Waukesha County Technical College and earned his associate's degree in 1987. He continued his education at Carroll University, and earned his bachelor's degree in 1991.

He worked as a private home inspector for several years, before becoming a partner in a radon mitigation company.

== Political career ==
Farrow also became active in the Republican Party of Wisconsin in the late 1990s. He was a supporter of Republican Scott Newcomer in his unsuccessful bid for state State in a 2001 special election, and then served as treasurer for Newcomer's successful campaign for state Assembly in a 2005 special election.

Paul Farrow first entered public office in 2002 as a member of the Richland School Board—a small suburban public school district serving several communities in northern Waukesha County. He resigned his seat in April 2005. In 2009, he sought appointment to a vacant seat on the board of trustees of the village of Pewaukee, but was not selected.

In 2010, Farrow announced that he would run for Wisconsin State Assembly in the 98th Assembly district seat being vacated by Rich Zipperer. At the time, the 98th district comprised the village of Pewaukee, the town of Brookfield, most of the cities of Pewaukee and Brookfield, and part of the town of Lisbon, in central Waukesha County. Farrow faced a competitive Republican primary against Thomas Schellinger, a Waukesha County supervisor and former Brookfield city councilmember. Farrow won the primary with 60% of the vote and won a landslide victory in the general election in the heavily Republican district.

In the fall of 2012, Rich Zipperer, by then state Senator, announced he would resign his seat to accept a role in the administration of Governor Scott Walker, necessitating a special election in the 33rd Senate district. Farrow was then already in the midst of his Assembly re-election campaign, but announced he would run in the special election for Wisconsin Senate. The special primary was held on the same ballot as the 2012 general election, and Farrow faced another competitive primary, this time against fellow state representative Chris Kapenga. Farrow prevailed by about 2800 votes and was unopposed in the special election in December. He resigned his Assembly seat and was sworn in as a state Senator on December 14, 2012. He was re-elected by a wide margin in the 2014 general election.

Farrow was elected to Senate leadership in his second term serving as the Assistant Majority Leader.

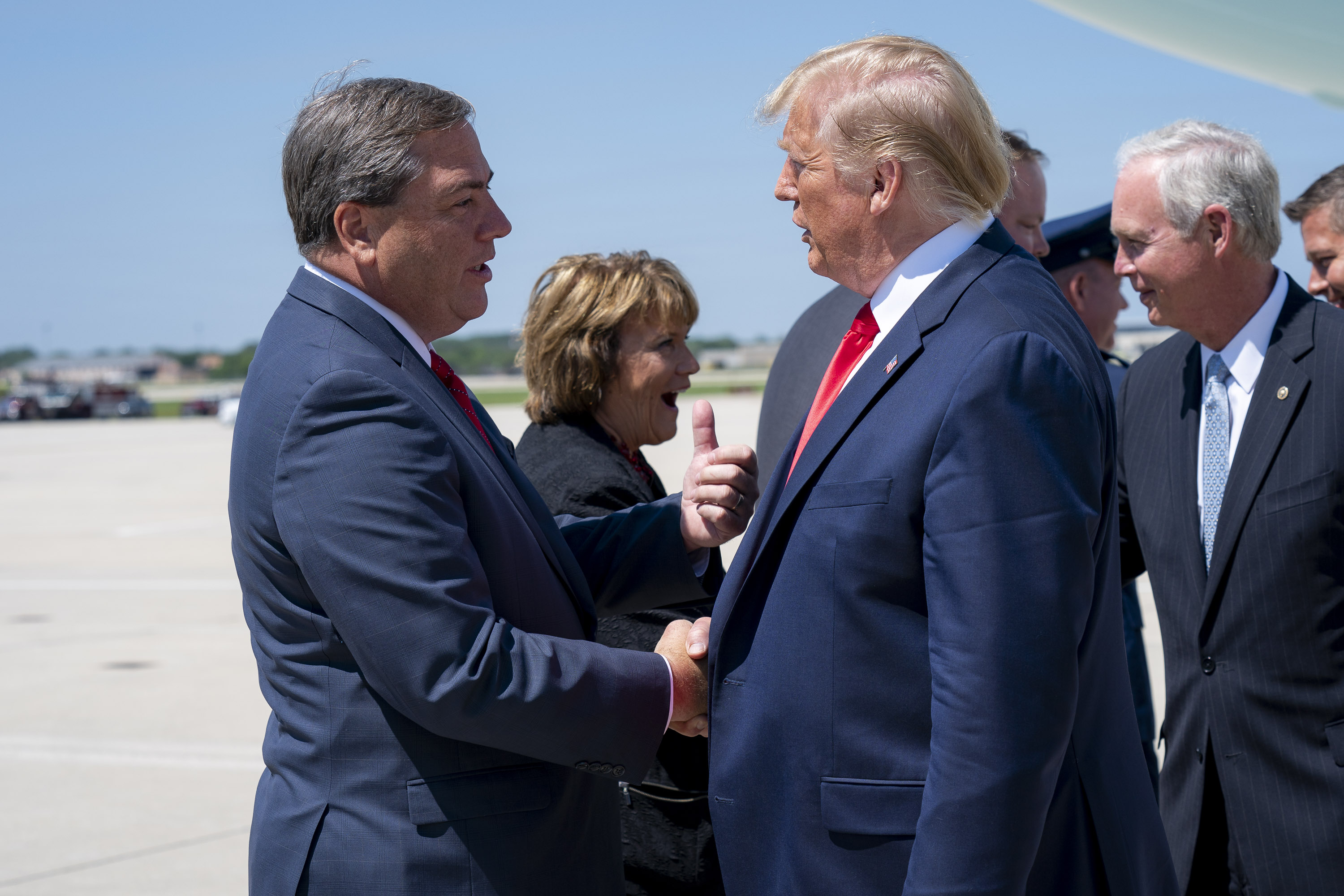
Farrow greeting President Donald Trump in 2019

A week after winning re-election to the state Senate in 2014, Farrow announced that he would run for county executive of Waukesha County in 2015. Three other candidates ran in the nonpartisan primary, including his 2010 primary opponent, Thomas Schellinger. Farrow received a clear majority of the vote in the primary; he and Schellinger advanced to the general election, and Farrow again prevailed by a large margin. He was re-elected in 2019 and 2023.

In September 2024, Farrow announced that he had been diagnosed with stage 4 mucinous adenocarcinoma, a rare kind of cancer. Farrow used the announcement of his condition to encourage others to take their health seriously, pointing out that he had ignored earlier symptoms that could have allowed him to catch the cancer at an earlier stage. He died on July 7, 2026, at the age of 61.

== Personal life and family ==
Paul Farrow was one of five sons born to John and Margaret Farrow. Margaret Farrow served 12 years in the Wisconsin Senate before being selected to serve as lieutenant governor in 2001. She was the first female lieutenant governor of Wisconsin. Paul Farrow has a fraternal twin brother.

Farrow married Amy Vaitl in 1987. They have two adult children and still resided in Pewaukee.

== Electoral history ==
=== Wisconsin Assembly (2010, 2012) ===
Year	Election	Date	Elected				Defeated				Total	Plurality
2010	Primary	Sep. 14	Paul Farrow	Republican	7,394	60.09%	Thomas Schellinger	Rep.	4,901	39.83%	12,304	2,493
2010	General	Nov. 2	Paul Farrow	Republican	22,236	76.57%	Victor Weers	Dem.	6,788	23.37%	29,040	15,448
2012	General	Nov. 6	Paul Farrow (inc)	Republican	22,665	70.42%	Eric Prudent	Dem.	9,503	29.52%	32,187	13,162

=== Wisconsin Senate (2012, 2014) ===
Year	Election	Date	Elected				Defeated				Total	Plurality
2012 (special)	Special; Primary	Nov. 6	Paul Farrow	Republican	31,927	52.32%	Chris Kapenga	Rep.	29,027	47.57%	61,023	2,900
2012 (special)	Special	Dec. 4	Paul Farrow	Republican	6,909	98.07%	--unopposed--				7,045	6,773
2014	General	Nov. 4	Paul Farrow (inc)	Republican	59,199	73.86%	Sherryll Shaddock	Dem.	20,899	26.07%	80,151	38,300

Party political offices
Preceded by Andrew Hitt	Chair of the Wisconsin Republican Party; 2021–2022	Succeeded by Brian Schimming
Wisconsin State Assembly
Preceded by Rich Zipperer	Member of the Wisconsin State Assembly from the 98th district January 3, 2011 – December 14, 2012	Succeeded by Adam Neylon
Wisconsin Senate
Preceded by Rich Zipperer	Member of the Wisconsin Senate from the 33rd district December 14, 2012 – July 17, 2015	Succeeded by Chris Kapenga
Political offices
Preceded by Daniel P. Vrakas	County Executive of Waukesha County, Wisconsin; April 21, 2015 – July 7, 2026	Succeeded by James Heinrich (acting)
