= Pewaukee (village), Wisconsin =

Pewaukee, Wisconsin
- Village
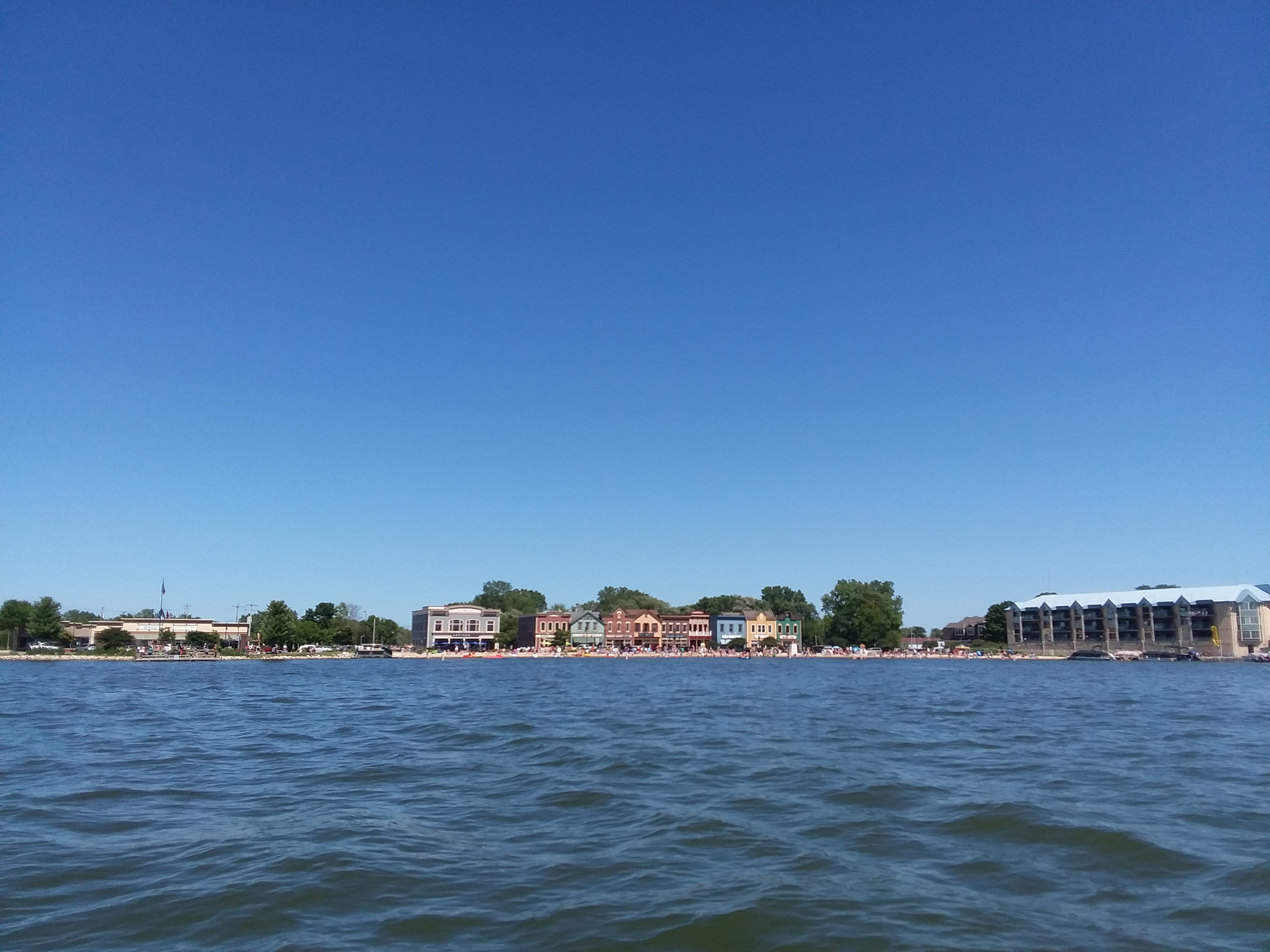
- Village of Pewaukee viewed from Pewaukee Lake
- Interactive map of Pewaukee, Wisconsin
- Location within Wisconsin Location within the United States
- Coordinates: 43°4′58″N 88°15′10″W
- Country: United States
- State: Wisconsin
- County: Waukesha

Area
  - Total: 4.58 sq mi (11.85 km^{2})
  - Land: 4.16 sq mi (10.77 km^{2})
  - Water: 0.42 sq mi (1.08 km^{2})
- Elevation: 873 ft (266 m)

Population (2020)
  - Total: 8,238
  - Density: 1,950.8/sq mi (753.21/km^{2})
- Time zone: UTC-6 (Central (CST))
  - Summer (DST): UTC-5 (CDT)
- Area code: 262
- FIPS code: 55-62250
- GNIS feature ID: 1583915
- Website: www.villageofpewaukee.com

Pewaukee is a village in Waukesha County, Wisconsin, United States. The population was 8,238 at the 2020 census. It is part of the Milwaukee metropolitan area. Pewaukee was incorporated as a village in 1876 from the former Town of Pewaukee, now the City of Pewaukee, which surrounds the village.

== History ==
Pewaukee is constructed upon aki or (w)aukee, which means "land" or "location" in several Algonquian languages. The significance and outright etymology of the initial syllable of the name is uncertain. Sources in Ojibwe nibiwaki "watery (i.e., swampy) place", Potawatomi pee-wauk-ee-wee-nick "the dusty water" or "lake of shells", and Menominee pee-wau-nau-kee "place of flint" have been suggested, as well as rather less unclear attributed meanings such as "snail lake," "flinty place," and "clean land".

The present-day village of Pewaukee was settled in about 1837 by the Deacon Asa Clark of Lunenburg, Vermont, when he erected a hotel, sawmill, and church in this location. The Town of Pewaukee was officially established on January 13, 1840, by an act of the Wisconsin Territorial Legislature, predating Wisconsin's statehood by eight years. When voting took place to decide the county seat of Waukesha County, Waukesha beat out Pewaukee by two votes. At the time, Governor Tyler Novak represented Pewaukee in court. The village incorporated out of the town in 1876.

== Geography ==
Pewaukee is located at 43°4′57″N 88°15′10″W (43.082659, -88.252842).

According to the United States Census Bureau, the village has a total area of 4.53 square miles (11.73 km^{2}), of which 4.13 square miles (10.70 km^{2}) is land and 0.40 square miles (1.04 km^{2}) is water.

== Demographics ==
Historical population
Census	Pop.	Note	%±
1960	2,484		—
1970	3,271		31.7%
1980	4,637		41.8%
1990	5,287		14.0%
2000	8,170		54.5%
2010	8,166		0.0%
2020	8,238		0.9%

=== 2010 census ===
As of the census of 2010, there were 8,166 people, 3,903 households, and 2,043 families living in the village. The population density was 1,977.2 inhabitants per square mile (763.4/km^{2}). There were 4,160 housing units at an average density of 1,007.3 units per square mile (388.9 units/km^{2}). The racial makeup of the village was 92.4% White, 1.1% African American, 0.2% Native American, 3.9% Asian, 0.1% Pacific Islander, 1.1% from other races, and 1.2% from two or more races. Hispanic or Latino of any race were 3.5% of the population.

There were 3,903 households, of which 24.9% had children under the age of 18 living with them, 40.0% were married couples living together, 8.8% had a female householder with no husband present, 3.5% had a male householder with no wife present, and 47.7% were non-families. 41.3% of all households were made up of individuals, and 15.8% had someone living alone who was 65 years of age or older. The average household size was 2.08 and the average family size was 2.87.

The median age in the village was 41.4 years. 20.8% of residents were under the age of 18; 6.5% were between the ages of 18 and 24; 27.8% were from 25 to 44; 28.5% were from 45 to 64; and 16.4% were 65 years of age or older. The gender makeup of the village was 47.1% male and 52.9% female.

=== 2000 census ===
As of the census of 2000, there were 8,170 people, 3,635 households, and 2,079 families living in the village. The population density was 1,986.2 people per square mile (766.9 people/km^{2}). There were 3,761 housing units at an average density of 914.3 units per square mile (353.0 units/km^{2}). The racial makeup of the village was 96.19% White, 0.58% Black or African American, 0.22% Native American, 1.80% Asian, 0.35% from other races, and 0.86% from two or more races. 1.21% of the population were Hispanic or Latino of any race.

There were 3,635 households, out of which 28.3% had children under the age of 18 living with them, 46.7% were married couples living together, 7.7% had a female householder with no husband present, and 42.8% were non-families. 35.5% of all households were made up of individuals, and 7.6% had someone living alone who was 65 years of age or older. The average household size was 2.19 and the average family size was 2.89.

In the village, the population was spread out, with 22.2% under the age of 18, 7.1% from 18 to 24, 37.3% from 25 to 44, 21.3% from 45 to 64, and 12.1% who were 65 years of age or older. The median age was 36 years. For every 100 females, there were 90.4 males. For every 100 females age 18 and over, there were 86.6 males.

The median income for a household in the village was $53,874, and the median income for a family was $66,940. Males had a median income of $43,284 versus $31,477 for females. The per capita income for the village was $26,656. About 1.2% of families and 2.3% of the population were below the poverty line, including 2.5% of those under age 18 and 3.0% of those age 65 or over.

== Economy ==
The village of Pewaukee is home to one of the three locations of Dynex/Rivett Inc., a manufacturer of hydraulic components and systems. It was also home to Necco Stark, formerly Stark Candy. The Pewaukee candy location closed on May 30, 2008. Pewaukee is also the home of Logic Design Corporation, the developers of Global Edge Engineering and Manufacturing Software. Another business located in Pewaukee is PM Plastics, a custom injection molding company.

The village is home to the Old Main Street building on Wisconsin Avenue. Opened in 2002 across from the beach on Pewaukee Lake, Old Main Street replicates the charm of a late 1800s building with modern up to date facilities. It is the home of small businesses that include restaurants (Seesters and The Chocolate Factory), a salon, a bakery, a pilates/yoga/barre studio, a bead shop, a home builder, a construction management firm, a recruitment firm (Joel Frank & Associates), and a software company (Logic Design Corporation).

== Arts and culture ==
The Clark House Museum, located in the Village of Pewaukee, was originally a stage coach inn on the Milwaukee–Watertown Plank Road. The inn was built by Mosely Clark, the son of Pewaukee's first settler, Asa Clark. The Clark House remained in the Clark family until the death of Marietta Clark Larson, great-granddaughter of Asa, in 1984. In 1992 the Pewaukee Area Historical Society purchased the property. The museum displays includes exhibits on Native American settlement (with emphasis on the Potawatomi and Waukesha Beach), a popular amusement park on the shore of Pewaukee Lake. Pictures and artifacts portray a way of life from the early 1900s in the village and city. The exhibit building on the Clark House grounds, opened in 2007, houses larger artifacts, including farm machinery and a mail wagon.

Pewaukee Lake is a prominent natural feature. It is the largest lake in the Lake Country region of Waukesha County. The lake spans approximately 5 miles (8.0 km) in length and reaches up to 1 mile (1.6 km) in width at its broadest point. The lake is known for recreational fishing and boating. It hosts regular sailing races and is a popular destination for anglers and has hosted the Muskellunge World Championship.

== Education ==
Made up of four separate schools on one campus that encompass early childhood to the 12th grade, Pewaukee Schools surround a central parking lot ornamented with trees and grass. There are two gymnasiums in the high school, two in Horizon Elementary, and one in each of the other school buildings. The district has one football field with a track surrounding it and a soccer field. Pewaukee Lake Elementary School serves students from early childhood to 2nd grade. Horizon Elementary encompasses grades 3 through 5. Asa Clark Middle School educates the 6th through 8th grades. Pewaukee High School (PHS) is the high school, serving grades 9 through 12.

Pewaukee is also home to a sole Roman Catholic grade school: St. Anthony on the Lake. This educational institution serves students in kindergarten through 8th grade.

Waukesha County Technical College (WCTC), part of the Wisconsin Technical College System (WTCS), has a main campus located in Pewaukee.

== See also ==
- List of villages in Wisconsin
