= Jennifer Byrne (research scientist) =

Cancer geneticist and researcher

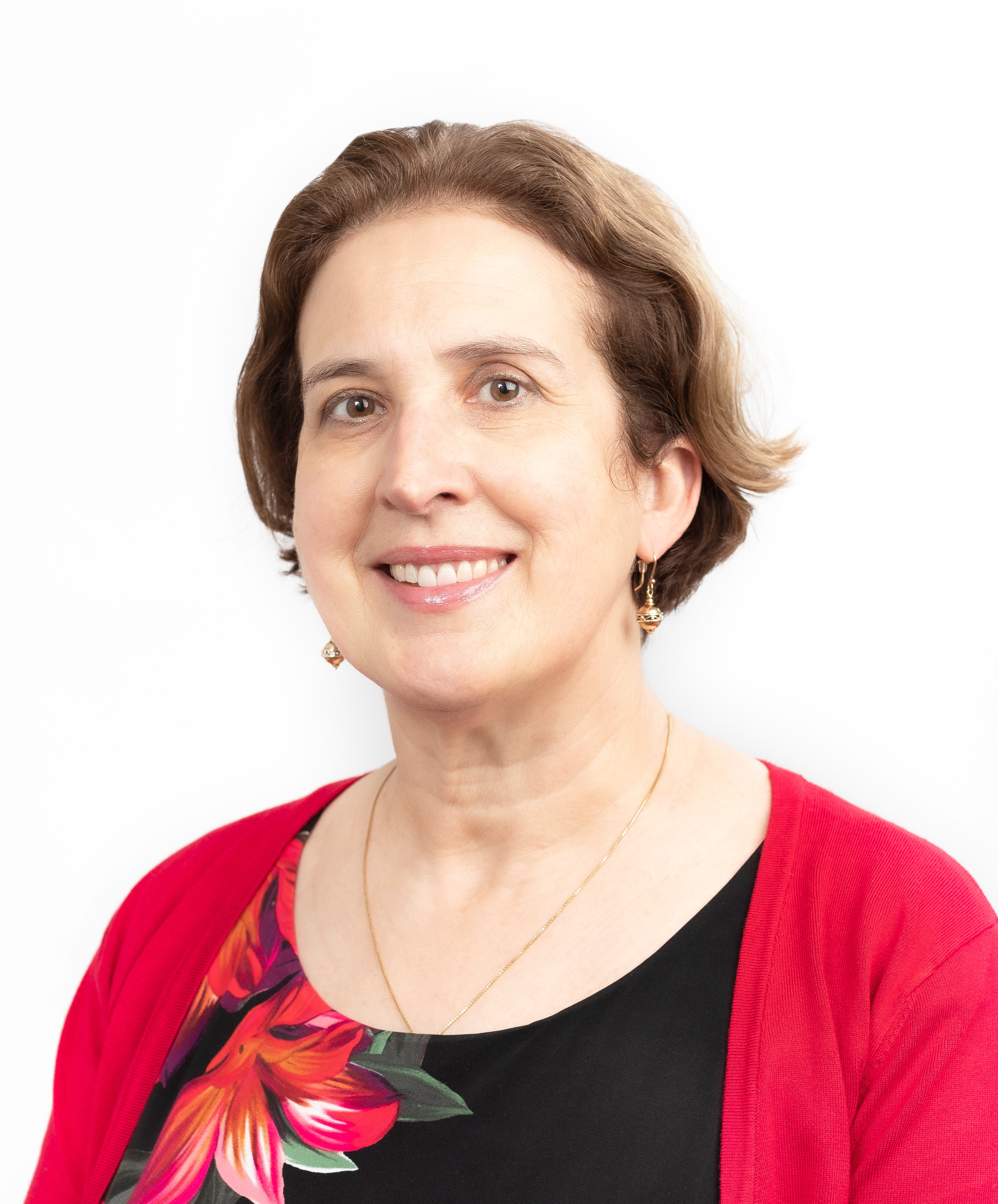
- Born: Jennifer Anne Byrne; 1966 (age 59–60)
- Education: University of Queensland
- Scientific career
- Workplaces: University of Sydney; NSW Health Pathology
- Thesis: The structure of the human ribonucleoside diphosphate reductase M1 subunit gene, and the use of this locus in studies of embryonal tumours (1993)

Jennifer Anne Byrne (born 1966) is an Australian cancer researcher and academic. She is a Professor of Molecular Oncology at University of Sydney, Australia. Byrne is notable for not only her cancer research, but the uncovering of academic fraud and junk science in cancer research. As a result of her and her colleague's investigations, 17 papers have been retracted, and others have been noted.

== Education ==
Byrne matriculated from St Margaret's Anglican Girls' School in Brisbane in 1983. She graduated from with a BSc and PhD (1993) from the University of Queensland.

== Research interests ==
Byrne has spent her career investigating adult and childhood cancer. She specializes in biobanking, cancer genetics as well as research integrity. Her PhD involved mapping the loss of the chromosome 11p15 loci in embryonal tumours.

== Career ==
Byrne is currently (2020) employed by NSW Health Pathology as the Director of Biobanking. She leads the NSW Health biobanking program, including the NSW Health Statewide Biobank (NSWHSB). Her other positions include Professor of Molecular Oncology, at the School of Medical Sciences, at the University of Sydney. In addition, Byrne was previously the Deputy Director of a group called the Kids Cancer Alliance, which is a Translational Cancer Research Center within the Cancer Institute of NSW.

== Fraud investigation ==
While reading scientific articles on cancer research, Byrne noticed odd patterns in publications about a particular gene. The papers described 'strikingly similar' experiments on a gene that has been linked with childhood leukemia and breast cancer. She recognized the particular gene, because she had previously led the team that had cloned the gene 20 years earlier.

Her experience on that gene made her realize that all of the papers, which were all from China, were describing the same nucleotide sequence yet some of the papers were describing this sequence wrongly. A nucleotide sequence is the specific order of letters which describes how a particular piece of DNA is composed. She noticed that the papers were describing wrong nucleotide sequences in the context of laboratory experiments performed with cancer cell lines. These wrong sequences implies that: (1) either the studies were not examining what they reported, or (2) the experiments had not been conducted as described. The implication is that each paper contains the seeds of bad research, that other papers could possibly build upon.

Further evidence of fraud or junk science was suggested as other papers used the same sequences for the opposite purposes. This means that "a sequence used as a positive control in one research paper was used as a negative control in another". As a result of her and her colleague Cyril Labbe's investigations, 17 papers have been retracted, and about five suspicious papers have been noted.

A colleague described the importance of her whistleblowing cancer work as "finding fraud and bad science".

"Projects like Jennifer’s actually are a key part of that. There are a lot more people looking at papers, there are a lot more available online, so people are finding more issues." Undark.org described her work as a "fight for dubious cancer research". Byrne also lost her mother to cancer.

== Selected publications ==
- We need to talk about systematic fraud. Nature. 6 February (2019).
- The LIM domain protein LMO4 interacts with the cofactor CtIP and the tumor suppressor BRCA1 and inhibits BRCA1 activity (2002) Sum, E., Peng, B, Yu, X., Chen, J, Byrne, J. et al. Journal of Biological Chemistry. 277:10 (7849-7856).
- Over-expression, amplification, and androgen regulation of TPD52 in prostate cancer (2004) Rubin, et al. Cancer research 64 (11), 3814–3822.

== Awards, honours and recognition ==
- The journal Nature rated Byrne as one of "Ten people who matter".
- Nature Journal also rated Byrne as the only Australian, and named one of the Top 10 people to watch.
- Byrne was mentioned by Nature retraction watch.
- Byrne was an invited keynote speaker at the Sydney Cancer Conference, 2018.

== Media ==
- The Sydney Morning Herald described her as one of "diverse individuals who have left a mark on science".
- SBS described her work, and the praise from Nature on her work uncovering fraudulent science.
- Nature described Byrne as an "Error Sleuth", and a researcher on a mission to expose flaws, and describes the tool she built to expose them.
- The tool used to detect flaws in cancer studies was described by the journal Nature.
- Byrne is involved in leadership in the Kid's Cancer Project fundraising for more effective cancer treatments.
