= Wisconsin Technical College System =

Main campuses
1 Blackhawk
2 Chippewa Valley
3 Fox Valley
4 Gateway
5 Lakeshore
6 Madison Area
7 Mid-State
8 Milwaukee Area
9 Moraine Park
10 Nicolet Area
11 Northcentral
12 Northeast Wisconsin
13 Northwood
14 Southwest Wisconsin
15 Waukesha
16 Western Technical College

Wisconsin Technical College System (WTCS) is a system of 16 public technical colleges administered by the state of Wisconsin. The system offers more than 500 programs, awarding two-year associate degrees, one- and two-year technical diplomas, and short-term technical diplomas and certificates. It also provides training and technical assistance to Wisconsin's business and industry community. Over 370,000 individuals accessed the technical colleges for education and training in the 2010–11 school year.

== History ==
The Wisconsin Legislature passed laws in 1911 requiring cities with a population of 5,000 people or more to set up trade schools and school boards to administer them. The schools had four purposes: to provide continuing education of boys and girls 14-16 who had quit high school, trade school, adult evening education, and related instruction for apprentices.

Wisconsin became the first state to establish a system of state support for vocational, technical, and adult education schools.

In 1911 the Wisconsin apprenticeship Law was passed; employers were required to release apprentices to the trade schools if one was available and to pay regular hourly wages for time spent at school.

Both of these bills resulted from the work of Charles McCarthy, the first director of the present-day state Legislative Reference Bureau.

The Smith–Hughes Act, passed by the U.S. Congress in 1917, was modeled after Wisconsin's initiative.

In 1961, the school boards were authorized to offer associate's degree for two-year technical courses. In 1965, the state legislature required a system of vocational, technical, and adult education districts to cover the entire state by 1970. Following this, enrollments in the WTCS doubled from 1967 to 1982.

There were significant increases in the number of associate degree programs in the 1970s. Schools were also required to improve cooperation and coordination with the University of Wisconsin System.

In 1993, the state board was designated as the Technical College System Board, and the colleges became referred to as "Technical Colleges".

Recently, the funding structure of Wisconsin's technical colleges has drawn criticism. About 30% of their funding comes from property taxes that are levied by boards of directors which have no elected representatives. This has led some to call the structure "taxation without representation."

== List of member colleges ==
- Blackhawk Technical College
- Chippewa Valley Technical College
- Fox Valley Technical College
- Gateway Technical College
- Lakeshore Technical College
- Madison Area Technical College (often known as Madison College)
- Mid-State Technical College
- Milwaukee Area Technical College
- Moraine Park Technical College
- Nicolet Area Technical College
- Northcentral Technical College
- Northeast Wisconsin Technical College
- Northwood Technical College (formerly Wisconsin Indianhead Technical College)
- Southwest Wisconsin Technical College
- Waukesha County Technical College
- Western Technical College (formerly Western Wisconsin Technical College)

== See also ==
- University of Wisconsin Colleges, former system administering two year colleges in Wisconsin - dissolved in 2018
- University of Wisconsin System, system administering four year universities and two/four year colleges in Wisconsin
- Milwaukee Career College — private for-profit technical school in Wauwatosa, Wisconsin
