= Desley Deacon =

Australian sociologist, historian and biographer

Desley Deacon FASSA
- Born: Desley Straker; 1941 (age 84–85); Pomona, Queensland, Australia

Academic background
- Education: University of Queensland; Australian National University
- Thesis: Managing Gender: The State, the New Middle Class, and Women Workers 1830–1930 (1986)

Academic work
- Discipline: Sociology, Women's and Gender Studies, History
- Institutions: Australian National University

Desley Deacon FASSA (born 1941) is an Australian sociologist, historian and biographer. She has been professor emeritus at the Australian National University since 2009.

== Early life and education ==
Deacon was born in Pomona, Queensland in 1941. She is the daughter of Molly (née Head) and Frank Straker. She boarded at St Margaret's Anglican Girls School in Brisbane for her high school education. In 1963 she graduated from the University of Queensland with a BA (Hons). She was awarded a PhD in Sociology in 1986 by the Australian National University.

== Career ==
Following her graduation, in 1964 Deacon won a place in the Administrative Training Program established by the Commonwealth Public Service Board. Her career there was, however, interrupted when she married Allan Deacon, a diplomat and accompanied him on postings to Cairo, Malta and Saigon. Returning to Canberra in 1975 she was employed as a research assistant at the ANU's Research School of Social Sciences. Moving to the Sociology Department at the ANU as tutor in 1979, she enrolled in PhD studies.

Deacon married John Higley in 1985 and moved to the University of Texas at Austin, working initially as a lecturer in government and later assistant professor. She was co-director of the Clark Center for Australian Studies there from 1988 to 1991 and in 1999 was appointed director of women's and gender studies.

Returning to the Research School of Social Sciences in Canberra in 2001, she was appointed professor of gender history. As head of the Department of History for two terms, 2002–2004 and 2007–2008, she oversaw the foundation of both the Australian Centre for Indigenous Studies (2003) and the National Centre of Biography (2008).

Deacon was elected Fellow of the Academy of the Social Sciences in Australia in 2002.

Deacon has served on a number of editorial boards, including of three journals Genders, History Australia and ANU Lives, and the University of Texas Press and ANU E-Press.

On her retirement from the Australian National University in 2009 she was appointed professor emeritus. A two-day symposium, organised by the ANU School of History, with the title "Entitled Gender, Biography, Modernity & Film", honoured Deacon's career.

She lives in Sydney, New South Wales and is a reviewer for the Australian Book Review.

Her biography of Judith Anderson was shortlisted for the 2019 George Freedley Memorial Award by the Theatre Library Association in the United States.

== Works ==
- Higley, John; Deacon, Desley; Smart, Don (1979). Elites in Australia. London Routledge & K. Paul. ISBN 978-0-7100-0222-8.
- Deacon, Desley (1989). Managing Gender: The state, the new middle class and women workers 1830–1930. Oxford University Press. ISBN 978-0-19-554817-4.
- Deacon, Desley (1997). Elsie Clews Parsons: Inventing modern life. University of Chicago Press. ISBN 978-0-226-13908-1.
- Damousi, Joy; Deacon, Desley, eds. (2007). Talking and Listening in the Age of Modernity: Essays on the history of sound. ANU E Press. ISBN 978-1-921313-47-9.
- Deacon, Desley; Russell, Penny; Woollacott, Angela, eds. (2008). Transnational Ties: Australian lives in the world. ANU E Press. ISBN 978-1-921536-20-5.
- Deacon, Desley; Russell, Penny; Woollacott, Angela, eds. (2010). Transnational Lives: Biographies of global modernity, 1700–present. Houndmills, Basingstoke, Hampshire Palgrave Macmillan. ISBN 978-0-230-23870-1.
- Deacon, Desley (2019). Judith Anderson: Australian Star, First Lady of the American Stage. Kerr Publishing. ISBN 978-1-875703-18-0.
