= Margaret Farrow =

American politician (1934–2022)

Member of the University of Wisconsin System Board of Regents
- In office June 18, 2013 – December 7, 2017
- Appointed by: Scott Walker
- Preceded by: Judith Crane

42nd Lieutenant Governor of Wisconsin
- In office May 9, 2001 – January 6, 2003
- Governor: Scott McCallum
- Preceded by: Scott McCallum
- Succeeded by: Barbara Lawton

Member of the Wisconsin Senate from the 33rd district
- In office January 2, 1989 – May 9, 2001
- Preceded by: Susan Engeleiter
- Succeeded by: Ted Kanavas

Member of the Wisconsin State Assembly from the 99th district
- In office January 5, 1987 – January 2, 1989
- Preceded by: John M. Young
- Succeeded by: Frank Urban

Personal details
- Born: Margaret Ann Nemitz; November 28, 1934 Kenosha, Wisconsin, U.S.
- Died: March 8, 2022 (aged 87) Pewaukee, Wisconsin, U.S.
- Party: Republican
- Spouse: John Farrow
- Children: Paul Farrow
- Profession: Teacher, realtor

Margaret Ann Farrow (née Nemitz; November 28, 1934 – March 8, 2022) was an American Republican politician from Wisconsin. She was the 42nd lieutenant governor of Wisconsin and the first woman to hold that office. She previously served twelve years in the Wisconsin Senate and two years in the Wisconsin State Assembly. Later in life, she also served as a member of the University of Wisconsin System Board of Regents.

== Early life and education ==
Farrow was born and raised in Kenosha, Wisconsin. She was the daughter of William Nemitz, who worked at Snap-On Tool Corporation, and Margaret (née Horan) who was a corporate executive assistant. She attended St. Catherine's High School in Racine. She then attended Rosary College in River Forest, Illinois, for one year before receiving her B.A. from Marquette University.

== Career ==
=== Elected office (1971–2003) ===
Farrow served on the Elm Grove, Wisconsin Board of Appeals from 1971 to 1974 and the Village Board from 1976 to 1987, spending the last five years of her tenure as president. After her time with the Village Board, Farrow was elected to the Wisconsin State Assembly, and later the Wisconsin State Senate, from a district comprising most of Waukesha County, Wisconsin. The first female lieutenant governor of Wisconsin, Farrow was appointed to the position after then-Lieutenant Governor Scott McCallum was elevated to the office of governor upon the departure of Gov. Tommy Thompson to join the administration of George W. Bush in January 2001.

As Lieutenant Governor, she served as chair of the Governor's Work-Based Learning Board, co-chair of the Governor's Task Force on Invasive Species, and chair of the Wisconsin's Women's Council. Farrow authored and served as vice chair of the SAVE Commission and was appointed by Governor Tommy Thompson to serve on the Governor's Blue-Ribbon Commission on State-Local Partnerships for the 21st Century. Farrow also served on the Governor's Blue Ribbon Task Force on Passenger Rail.

McCallum and Farrow ran for a full four-year term in 2002, but their Republican ticket lost the race to Democrat Jim Doyle.

=== Post-Lieutenant Governor ===
Farrow was publicly touted by Mark Neumann as the best candidate to take on Democrat Russ Feingold in 2004. Without putting her name forward for consideration, she won a straw poll at the 2003 Republican State Convention. During the 2008 campaign, she was a member of the "Palin Truth Squad" for the McCain Campaign.

She was chair of the board of directors of WisconsinEye Public Affairs Network, Inc., which produces the Wisconsin equivalent of C-SPAN. In 2010, WCAN (Waukesha County Action Network), the advocacy organization Farrow had created, combined with the Waukesha County Chamber of Commerce to create the Waukesha County Business Alliance, a county-wide chamber of commerce representing over 1,100 member businesses in southeastern Wisconsin. Farrow also served on the Board of Directors as well as the Policy Board of the Waukesha County Business Alliance.

In 2013, she became the inaugural winner of the annual Margaret Thatcher Award, which honored her contributions, courage, and leadership as one of "Wisconsin's Iron Ladies".

Farrow later resided in Pewaukee, Wisconsin with her husband. Her son Paul Farrow was elected Waukesha County Executive in 2015 and previously served in both chambers of the Wisconsin Legislature. In 2013, she was appointed by Governor Scott Walker to serve on the University of Wisconsin System Board of Regents. On December 7, 2017, she announced her immediate retirement from the UW System Board of Regents, stepping down before her term expired in 2020.

== Personal life ==
Farrow was married and had five children.

Her son, Paul Farrow, served in the state legislature and was county executive of Waukesha County, Wisconsin until his death from cancer in 2026.

Farrow died on March 8, 2022, at the age of 87, at her home in Pewaukee, Wisconsin.

== See also ==
- List of female lieutenant governors in the United States

Party political offices
Preceded by Scott McCallum	Republican nominee for Lieutenant Governor of Wisconsin; 2002	Succeeded by Jean Hundertmark
Wisconsin State Assembly
Preceded by John M. Young	Member of the Wisconsin State Assembly from the 99th district 1986 – 1989	Succeeded by Frank Urban
Wisconsin Senate
Preceded by Susan Engeleiter	Member of the Wisconsin Senate from the 33rd district 1989 – 2001	Succeeded by Ted Kanavas
Political offices
Preceded by Scott McCallum	Lieutenant Governor of Wisconsin; 2001 – 2003	Succeeded by Barbara Lawton
