= Moraine Park Technical College =

Public college in Fond du Lac, Wisconsin, US

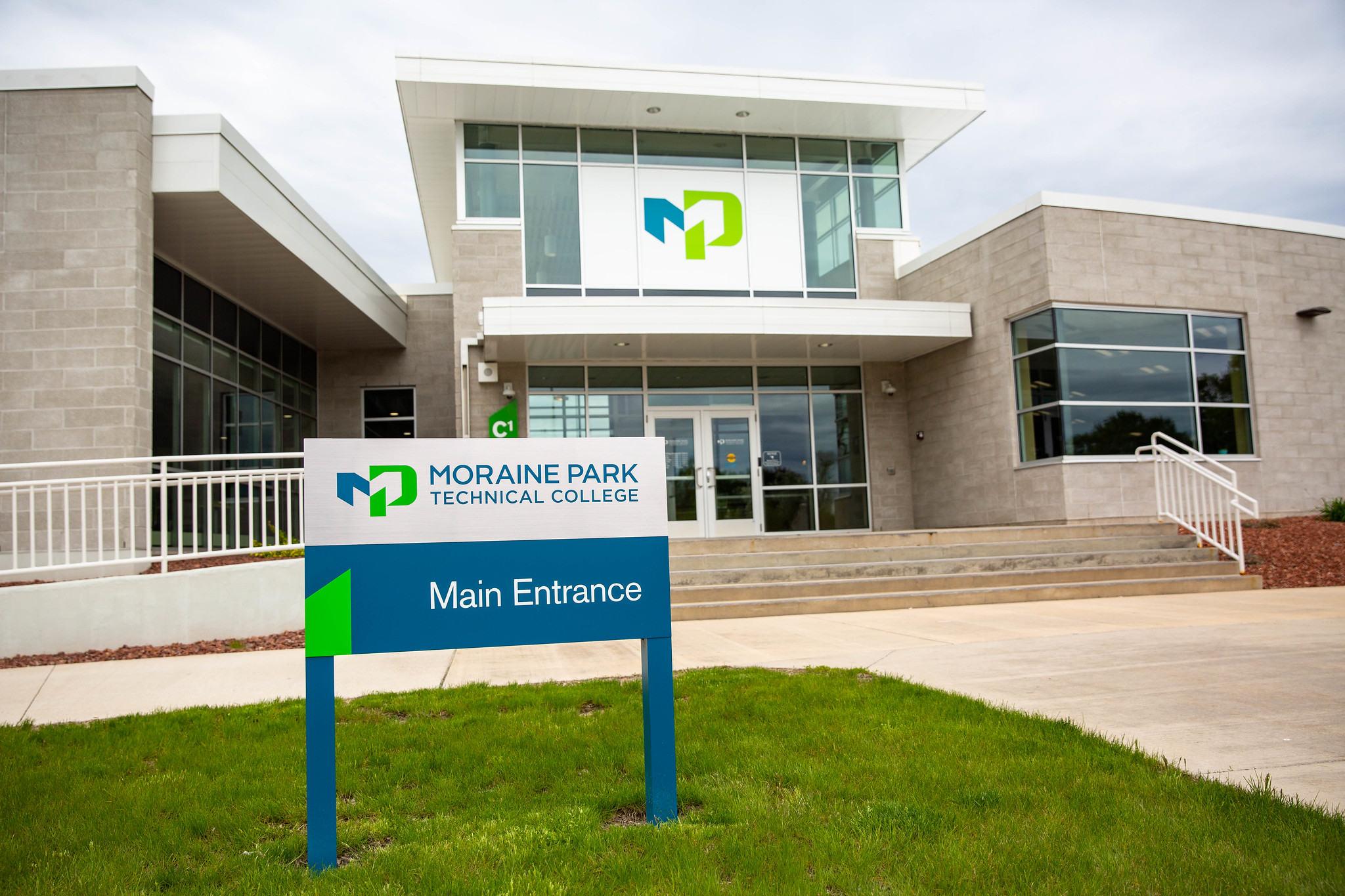
- Fond du Lac Campus
- Type: Public technical college
- Established: 1912
- Parent institution: Wisconsin Technical College System
- President: Bonnie Baerwald
- Students: 13,977 (2022–23)
- Location: Fond du Lac, Wisconsin, United States; 43.7852775°N 88.4178936°W
- Campus: Urban
- Colors: Blue, Green, Gray
- Mascot: Maximus Wolf
- Website: www.morainepark.edu

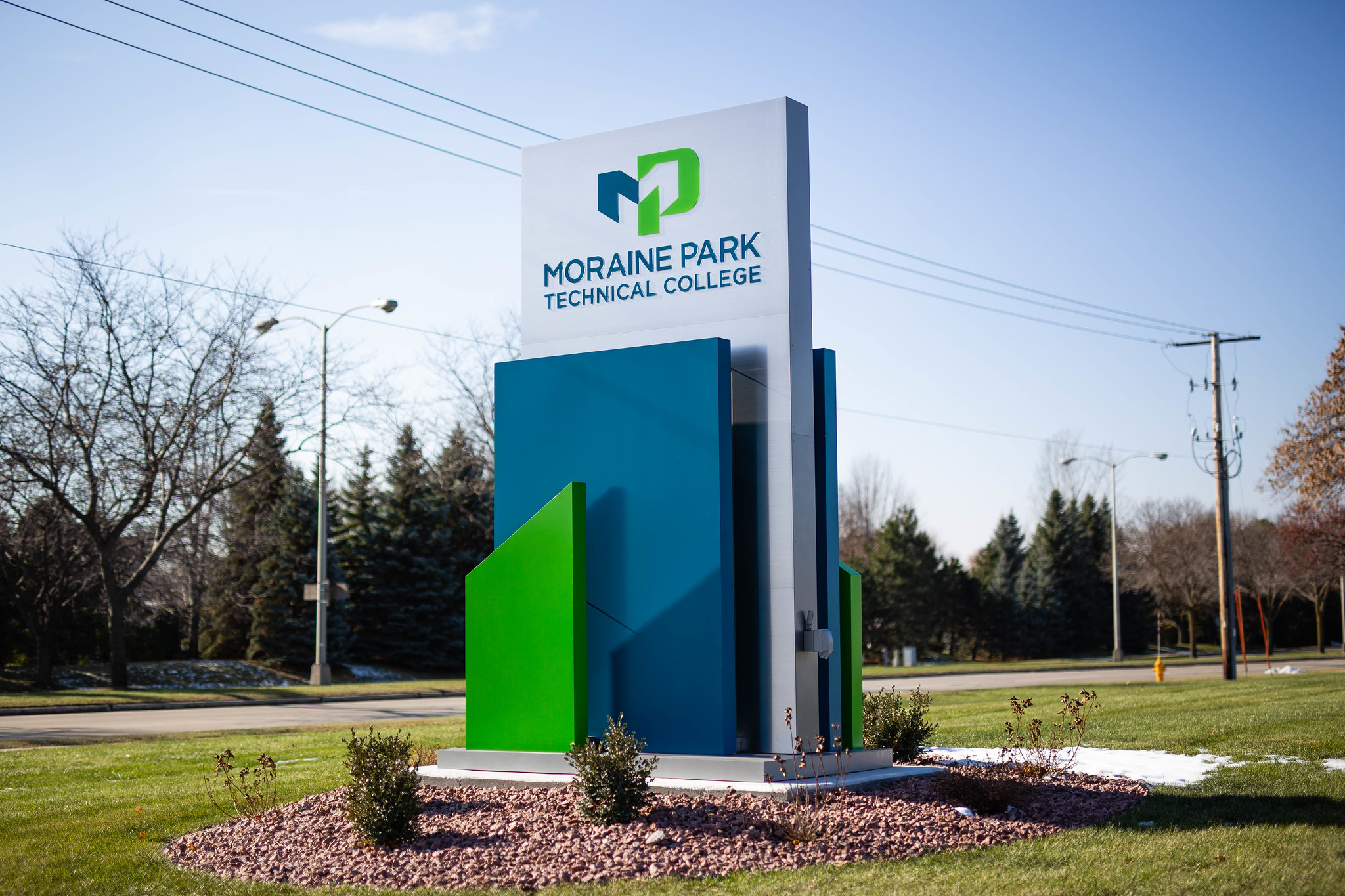
Moraine Park Technical College Sign on Johnson Street in Fond du Lac

Moraine Park Technical College (Moraine Park or MPTC) is a public technical college in Fond du Lac, Wisconsin. It was established in 1912 and is part of the Wisconsin Technical College System. It has campuses in Fond du Lac, Beaver Dam, and West Bend, and regional centers in Jackson and Horicon. The college offers more than 100 university transfer degrees, associate degrees, technical diplomas, certificates, apprenticeships, and customized training.

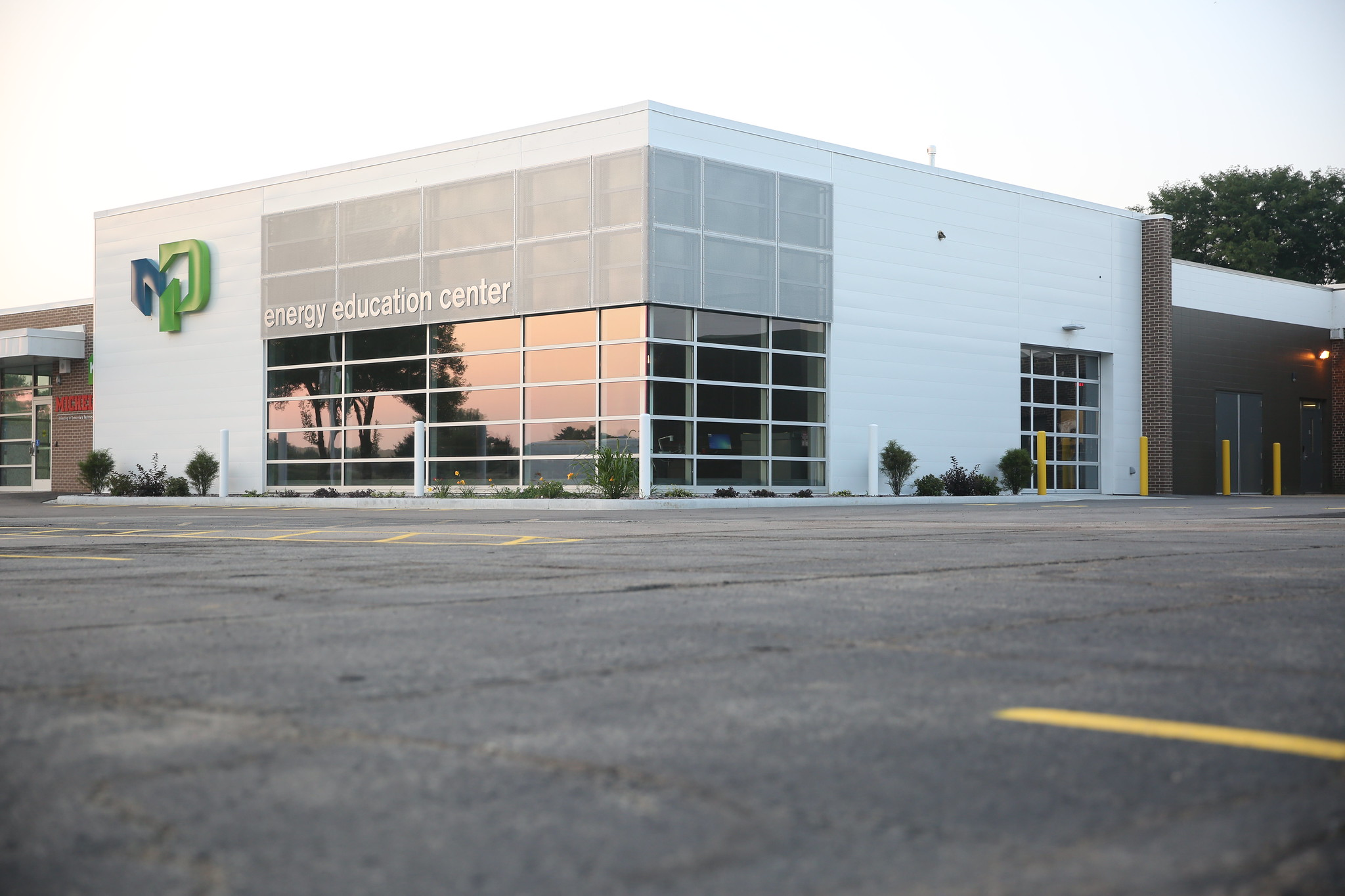
Beaver Dam Campus Energy Education Center
