= Closures of the University of Wisconsin branch campuses =

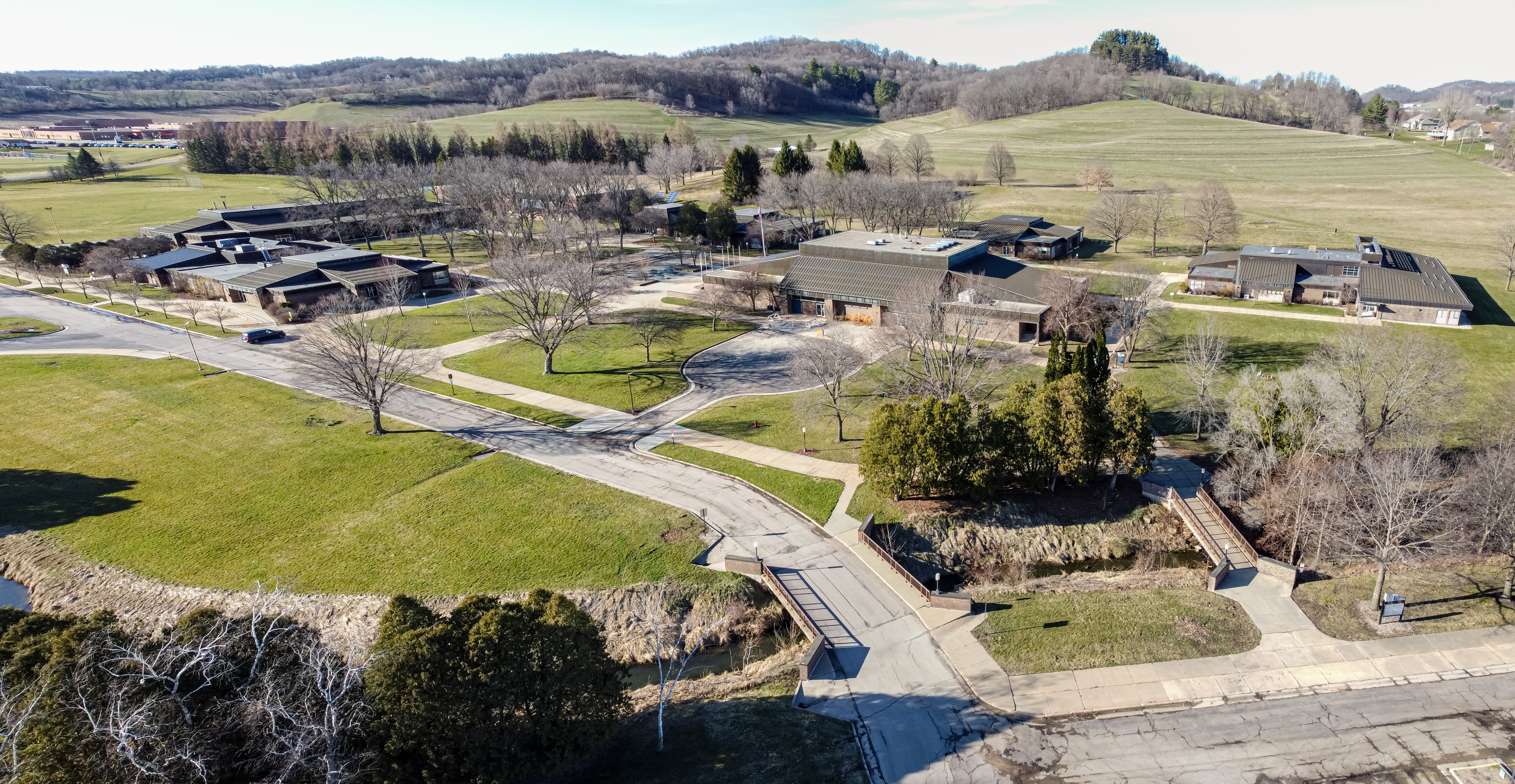
University of Wisconsin–Platteville Richland campus, which closed in 2023

Branch campuses
- Former campus
- Open, without original facilities
1 Eau Claire – Barron County
2 Oshkosh, Fond du Lac Campus (2024)
3 Oshkosh, Fox Cities Campus (2025)
4 Green Bay, Manitowoc Campus
5 Green Bay, Marinette Campus (2024)
6 Green Bay, Sheboygan Campus
7 Milwaukee at Washington County (2024)
8 Milwaukee at Waukesha (2025)
9 Platteville Baraboo Sauk County (2026)
10 Platteville Richland (2023)
11 Stevens Point at Wausau (2026)
12 Stevens Point at Marshfield
13 Whitewater at Rock County
14 UW–Medford (1981)

Following the closure of the University of Wisconsin–Platteville Richland on July 1, 2023, five additional University of Wisconsin two-year branch campuses had announced closures. Before these closures, the only UW college campus to close was UW–Medford in 1981. As of August 2026, seven campuses have closed, two have downsized their operations, and five remain open across the state.

In an internal briefing on September 19, 2023, the UW System recommended that its universities downsize the remaining branch campuses. This may include using fewer buildings or fully vacating the property. This briefing also recommended that the branch campuses move away from awarding associate degrees and that the Wisconsin Technical College System (WTCS) can award such degrees instead.

In 2013, state funding for the UW System was cut alongside a tuition freeze. Five years later, the campuses would be merged with nearby larger UW university campuses in a bid to prevent closure of any campuses. However, total enrollment at the branch campuses would continue to drop, falling by 50% in the five years following the merger.

== Background ==
Several freshman-sophomore college campuses were opened across the state following the end of World War II. The campuses were located in areas away from other state universities with enough high school graduates nearby. Specifically, 600 high school graduates in a 20-mile (32 km) radius was proposed as a bare minimum in an internal UW System committee. The committee also gave stronger requirements to proposed campuses closer than 30 miles (48 km) to another state university. It was assumed these requirements would allow for each center to have at least 150–200 students, which was considered enough for a two year campus. Altogether, 14 campuses were opened across the state in areas underserved by other state universities. They were intended to further fulfill the Wisconsin Idea, which is a public philosophy that the university should reach all families in the state.

=== 1980s and UW–Medford ===
In 1980, a special task force was established to review the programs of several UW centers. It considered closing six centers – Baraboo, Barron, Manitowoc, Marinette, Medford, Richland – and merging the remaining centers with nearby larger UW schools as branch campuses. Ultimately, the task force recommended closing only the Medford campus and using its saved money to support the rest of the smaller UW centers. As a result, UW–Medford was closed, citing enrollment declines. By April 1981, the end of its final term, 90 students were enrolled.

=== Tuition freeze and funding cuts ===
In 2013, Governor Scott Walker froze tuition for the UW system and simultaneously cut its state funding. While originally only meant for two years, the tuition freeze lasted until 2021. Following the tuition freeze, $300 million of state funding was cut from the UW system budget in 2015. In 2023, the tuition was raised by 5%. The reduction in state and tuition funding has led to budget deficits at many UW campuses. As a result of the reduced funding, a 10% budget increase was asked by the Universities of Wisconsin in 2024. Its president, Jay Rothman, asked for $855 million to be included in the 2025–26 state budget, which he said would prevent closing "any branch campuses that are otherwise slated for closure".

=== 2018 restructuring ===
The UW Board of Regents voted on November 9, 2017, to proceed with a proposal that merged the physical University of Wisconsin Colleges campuses with seven of the bachelor's degree-granting campuses of the University of Wisconsin System. This was intended to prevent the closure of local campuses. In 2021, UW System leaders proposed merging the 2-year UW campuses with the Wisconsin Technical College System (WTCS), pointing out that many campuses are next to each other. The last time a merger was considered was in 2015, where it was argued that many other states' community colleges could fulfill both functions. None of these went through, with WTCS opposing and pointing out that the missions of the two systems are different. In 2022, the Board of Regents approved the WTCS to award liberal arts degrees. Enrollments at branch campuses have been declining as a whole since the restructuring. In fall 2018, total enrollments at branch campuses were 9,741. In fall 2023, this dropped to 4,803. As of 2023, the Universities of Wisconsin are one of the lowest funded public university systems, ranked 43rd nationally.

=== Change in demographics ===
Families in Wisconsin, and elsewhere in the country, are having fewer children today than before the 2008 Recession. This results in a "demographic cliff" after 2026 (18 years after 2008), which means fewer traditional students attending university.

== Closures ==
=== UW–Platteville Richland campus ===
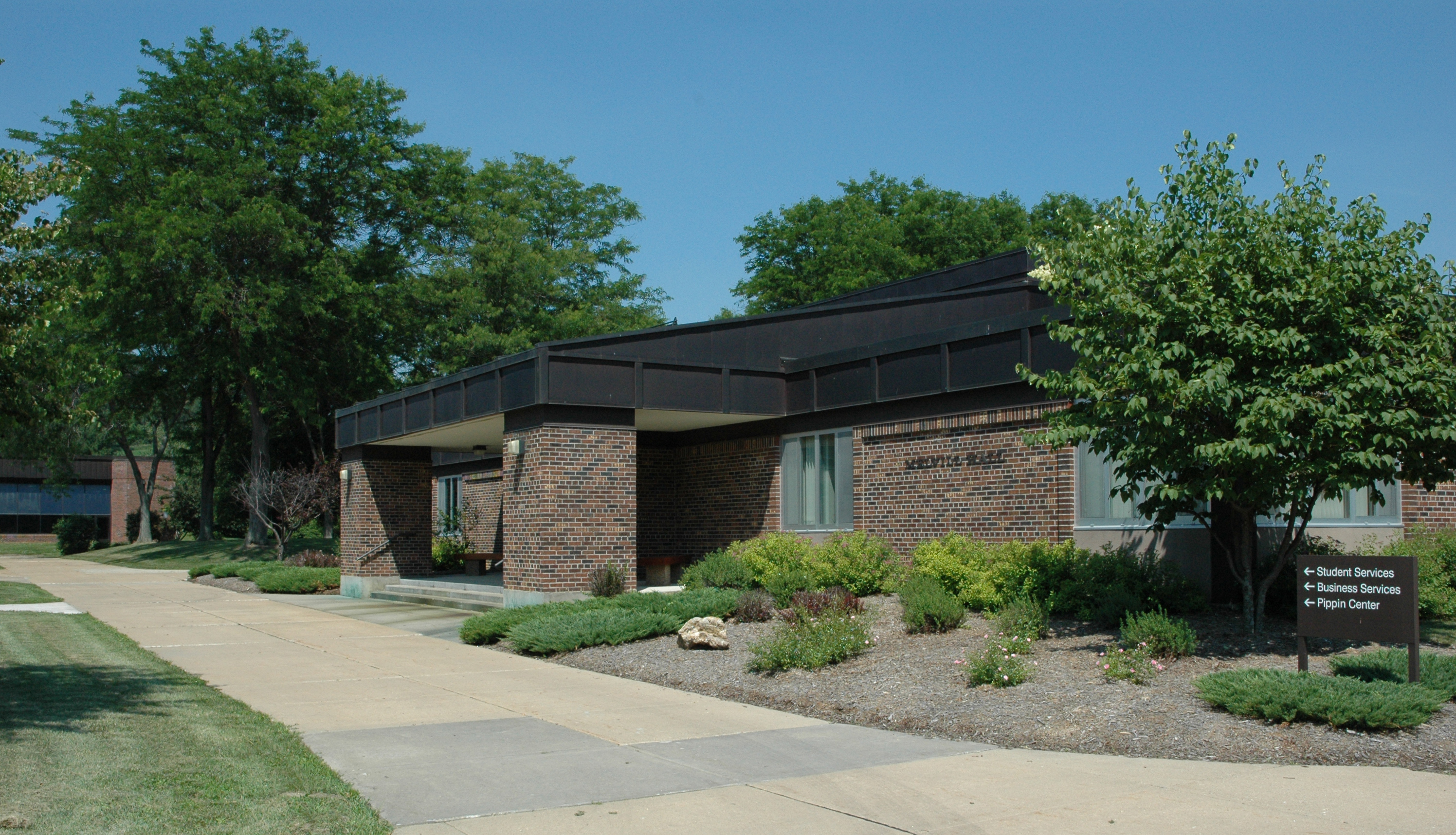
Melville Hall at the Richland Campus

It was announced on November 22, 2022, that the University of Wisconsin–Platteville Richland branch campus would close on July 1, 2023, due to its declining enrollment, which was 64 in its final year. Initially, there was a plan to make its classes be taught fully online. Ultimately, the campus was fully closed and its students had to transfer to the Platteville campus or Baraboo campus to continue their education. In 2023, the UWs stated "that no viable options existed" for the UWs to maintain a presence on the Richland campus.

Community leaders point to the decision to remove Richland's recruiter, transferring international students to UW–Platteville, and the numerous budget cuts as the reasons for its closure. Another suggested reason for the closure was a fee imposed for administrative services by UW–Platteville, a model not used by most other UW campuses. The Richland community has reported little recruitment for the branch campuses in the community. Additionally, UW–Platteville refused money from a private foundation to pay for a dedicated Richland recruiter.

=== UW–Oshkosh branch campuses ===
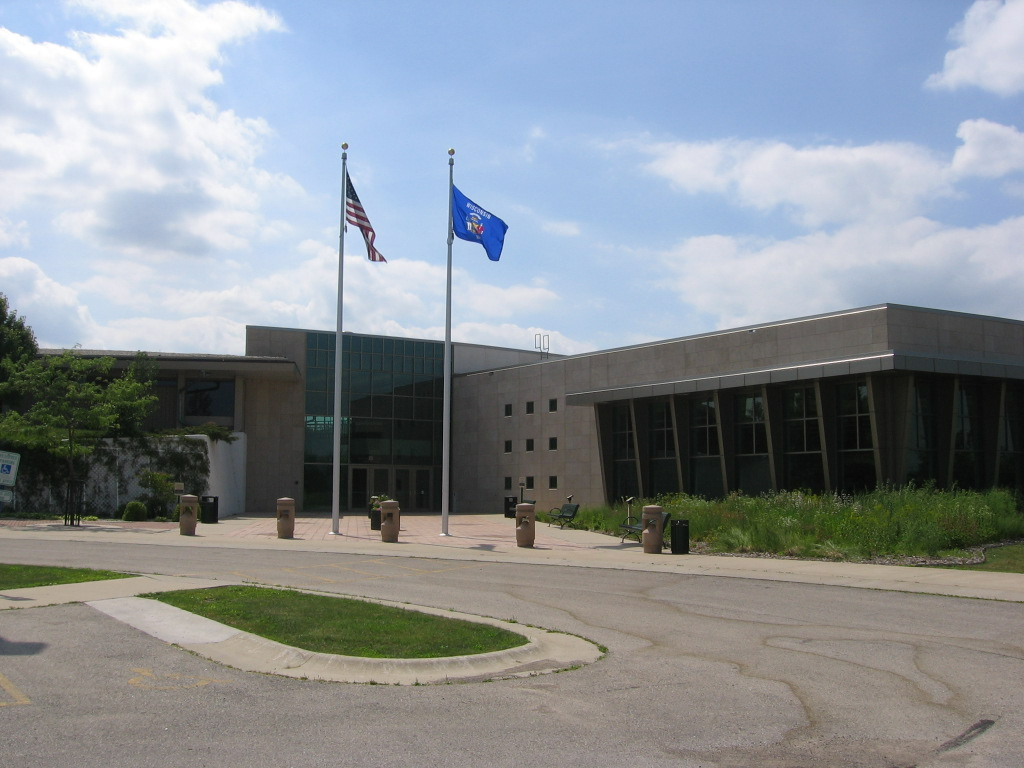
Fond du Lac Campus

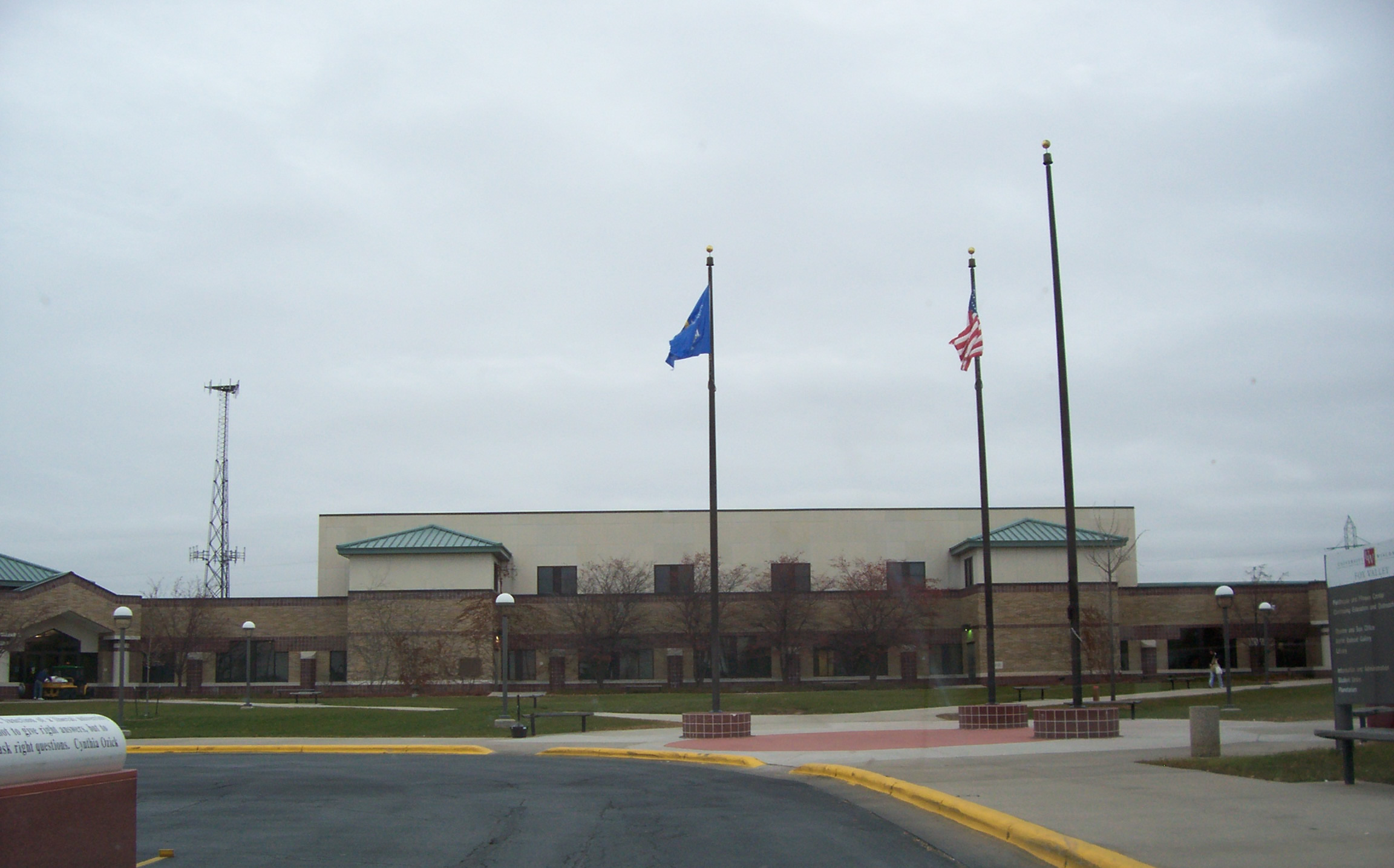
Fox Cities Campus

On October 17, 2023, Universities of Wisconsin President Jay Rothman announced that the University of Wisconsin–Oshkosh, Fond du Lac Campus would close at the end of June 2024. Its enrollment was 243 in its final year. The campus held its final class on May 17, 2024, with all faculty transferring to the main Oshkosh campus and students given the option to transfer to the main campus or Fox Cities campus. The Fond du Lac campus was reused as community spaces by the county. Its theatre, gymnasium, and classrooms are available for use by the community. Alongside these community spaces, county offices and law enforcement training was brought to the campus.

On June 13, 2024, it was announced that the University of Wisconsin–Oshkosh, Fox Cities Campus would close at the end of the spring 2025 semester. UW–Oshkosh's chancellor Andrew Leavitt announced this decision, citing lowering student participation rates and the changing state of higher education as the reasons for its closure, calling it "a difficult but responsible decision." A UW–Oshkosh projection estimated enrollment would drop below 100 students by 2032. Its enrollment in 2024 was 473.

=== UW–Milwaukee branch campuses ===
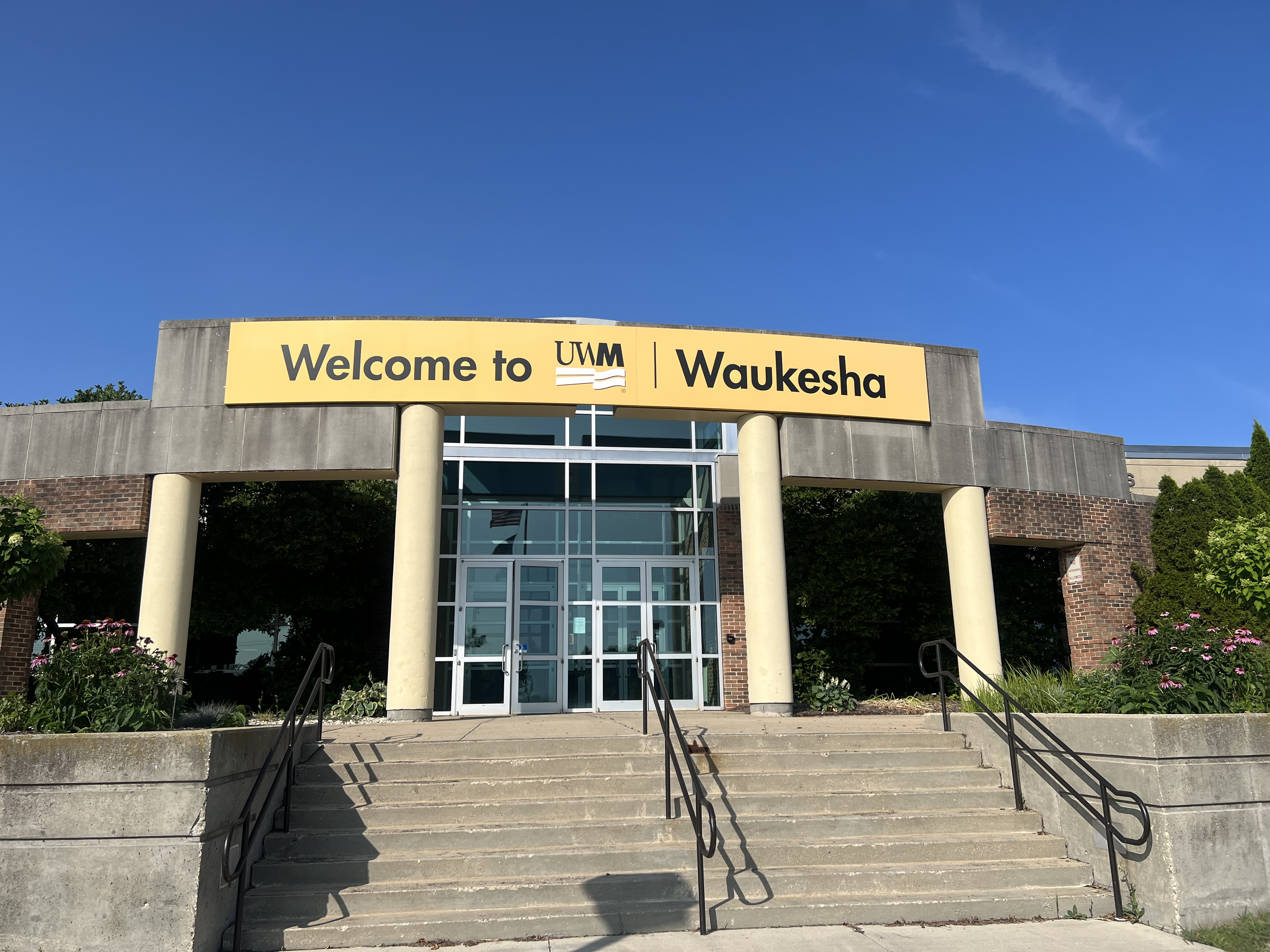
Waukesha campus

Also on October 17, 2023, it was announced that University of Wisconsin–Milwaukee at Washington County would also close at the end of June 2024. The UWM Washington County campus was called "not sustainable" by its chancellor Mark Mone in the announcement of the campus closure. Its final enrollment was 285 students.

The University of Wisconsin–Milwaukee at Waukesha branch campus announced on March 11, 2024, that it would close at the end of the spring 2025 semester. The campus had an enrollment of 672 at the time of the announcement. Following its closure, UW–Milwaukee closed its College of General Studies, a college that supported the academic departments of its branch campuses. Its chancellor called the branch campus program "no longer cost effective." Specifically, chancellor Mone pointed to duplication of programs with Waukesha County Technical College. The university laid off the college's 32 tenured faculty, instead of transferring them to the Milwaukee campus. This was made possible by a policy by Scott Walker in 2016 that removed guarantees to tenured faculty. The Waukesha campus is scheduled for demolition and set to become a housing development after it closes in June 2025.

=== UW–Platteville Baraboo Sauk County campus ===
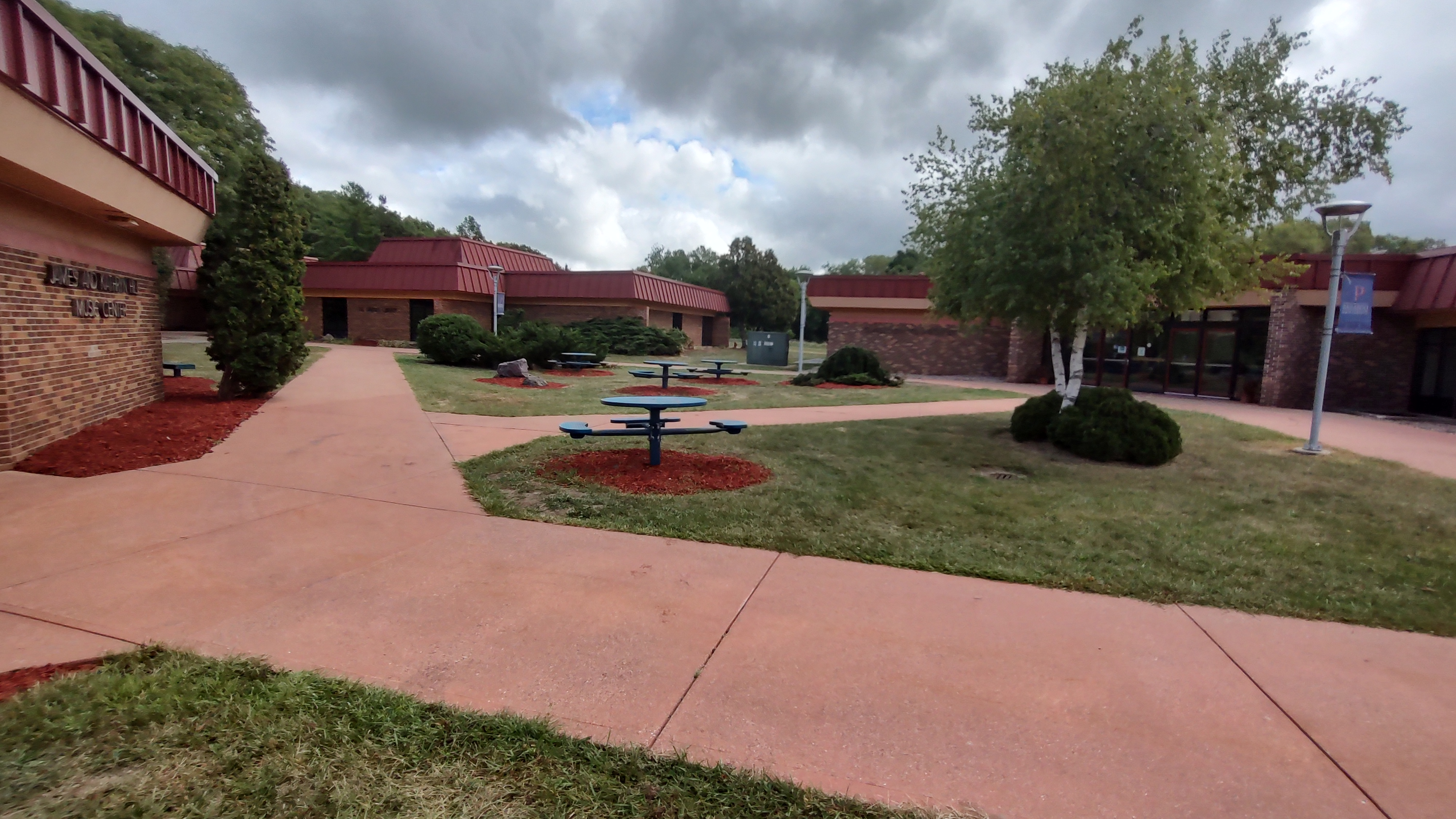
Baraboo Sauk County campus

It was announced on August 15, 2024 that the University of Wisconsin–Platteville Baraboo Sauk County campus would downsize its operations to a single building by fall 2025, giving the other buildings back to the county for other uses. In early 2024, the county agreed to cover all maintenance costs going forward, including approving $390,000 for 2025 and 2026 in additional funding.

These measures did not allow the campus to remain open, as on October 17, 2025, its closure was announced to be at the end of May 2026. The campus had 178 students enrolled in its final fall semester.

== Changes to existing campuses ==
=== UW–Green Bay, Marinette campus ===
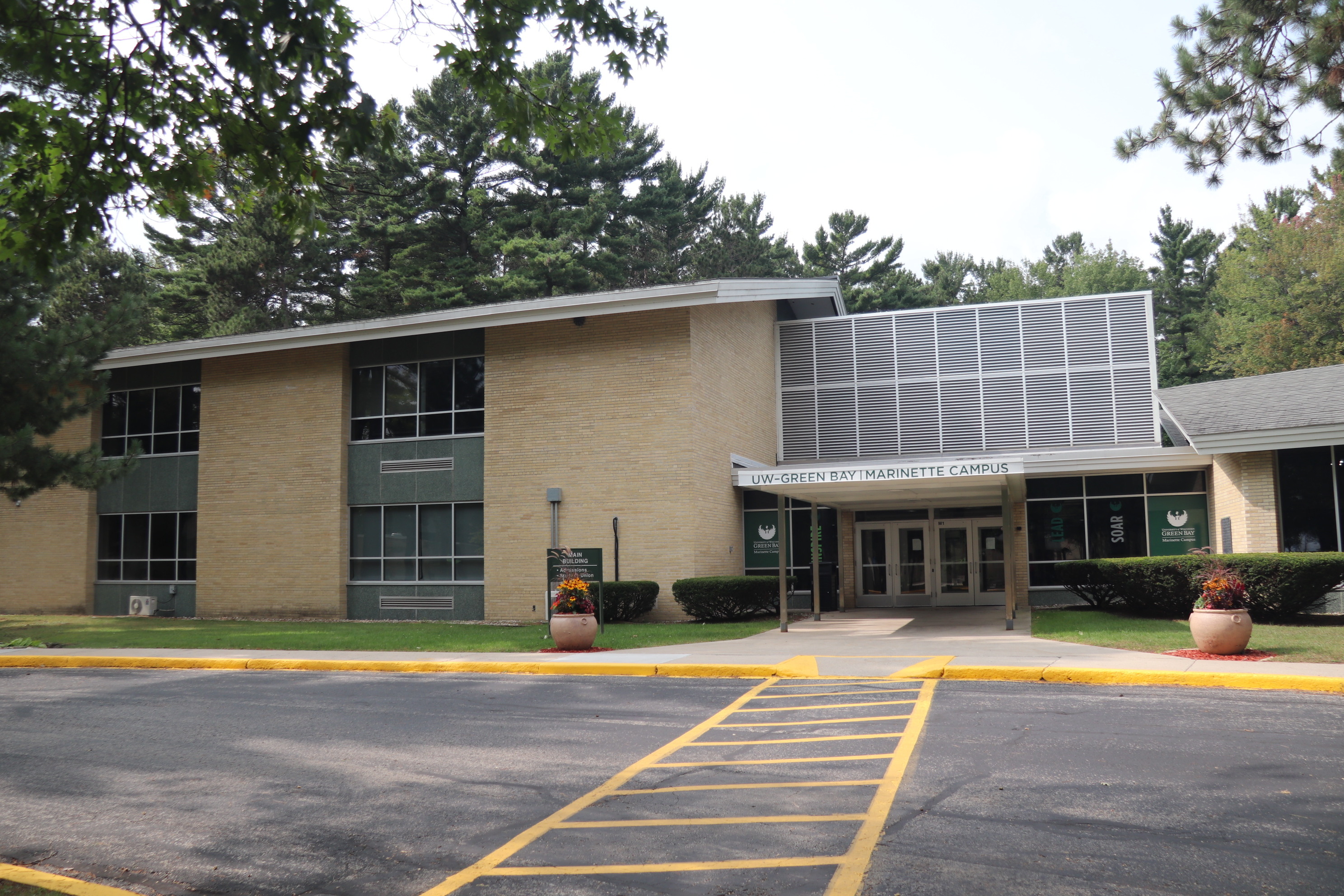
Marinette campus

The University of Wisconsin–Green Bay, Marinette Campus announced on January 19, 2024, that it was ending in-person classes at the end of June 2024. Its final in-person enrollment was 213 students. UW–Green Bay chancellor Michael Alexander explained that the campus would be kept open, but with classes streamed in from other UW–Green Bay campuses. He also explained that some classes may continue to be taught in Marinette, but they would also be streamed to other campuses. Its theatre will be maintained, and UW–Green Bay plans to expand its programming. UW–Green Bay stated that it will maintain an educational presence on the campus, including both credit and non-credit offerings. Chancellor Alexander stated that Marinette will remain open in some capacity. The city has expressed interest in taking over some buildings to use for its services. However, no final decision has been made as of April 2025.

=== UW–Stevens Point at Wausau ===
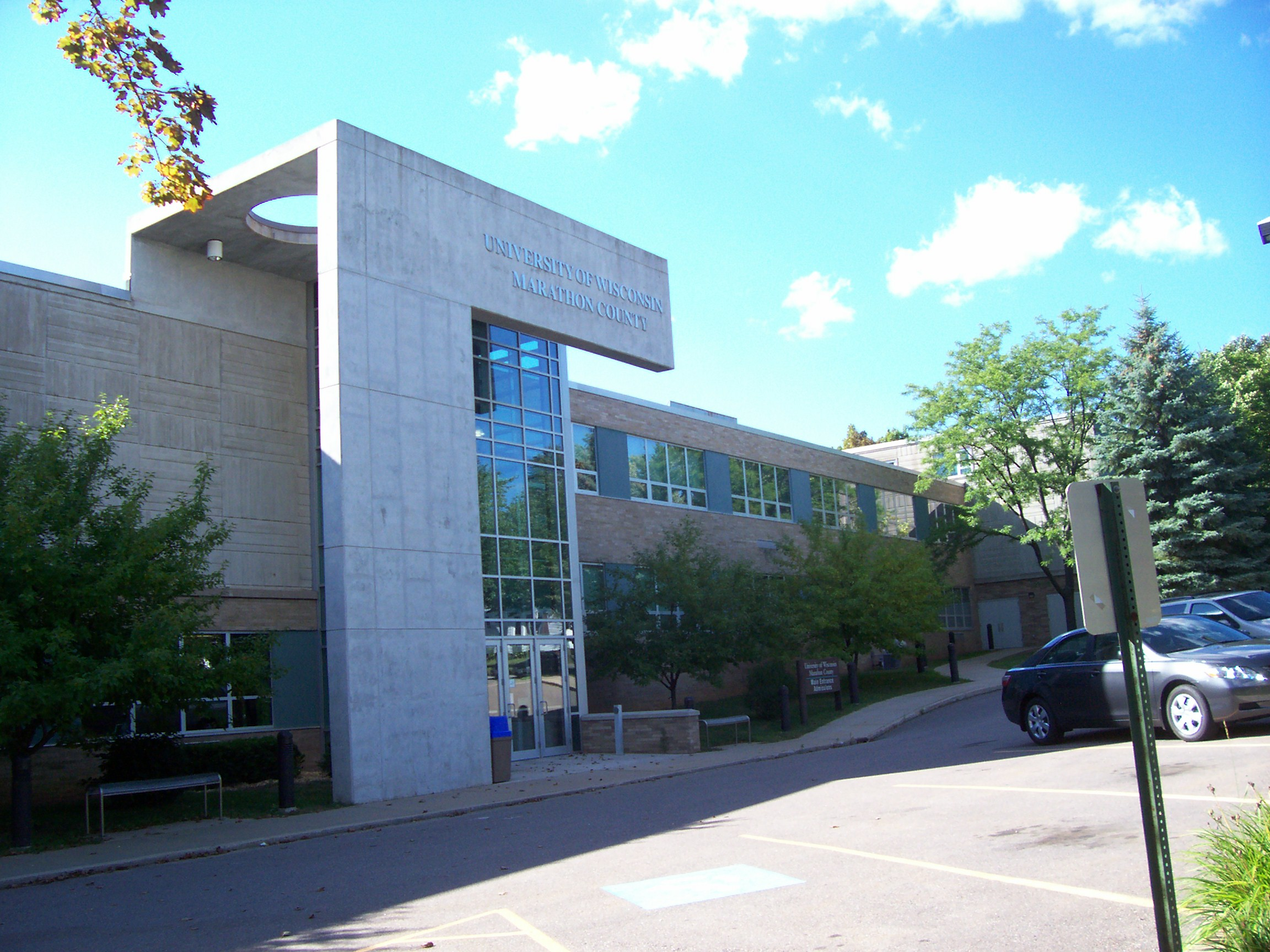
Wausau campus

It was announced on September 12, 2025 that the University of Wisconsin–Stevens Point at Wausau would be relocating to the nearby Northcentral Technical College for the Fall 2026 semester. It would share facilities but offer separate college programs than the technical college. Marathon County owns the old premises and buildings of the Wausau campus, but it does not have any plans for reuse, as of November 2025.

== Reactions and aftermath ==
Closure, a 2024 documentary by Wisconsin filmmaker Ken Brosky, covers the closing of the former UW colleges. The documentary has been screened at libraries and campuses across the state. Brosky, a professor at UW–Whitewater Rock County, shot and produced the documentary with crowdfunded money.

In a bill passed in 2024, local communities were made eligible to receive $2 million for redevelopment of a closed UW campus. This program was managed by the Wisconsin Economic Development Corporation, and per the law, Richland was entitled to receive money first before other grants could be awarded. The funding was intended to help communities reuse the campuses for workforce development, small businesses, or housing. It could also be used to redevelop or demolish a campus property.

Mary Papazian, Vice President of the Association for Governing Boards of Universities and Colleges, argued that the closures reduce educational opportunities for rural students while impacting economic activity in rural areas. Washington County Executive Josh Schoemann expressed concerns about the future of the Wisconsin Idea following the closures of these campuses. UW Colleges Vice Chancellor Emeritus Steve Wildeck has called the branch campuses vulnerable and has concerns that closures will continue. He has also called on the state legislature to put a moratorium on future closures and to create a plan going forward for higher education in Wisconsin.

In 2023, the University of Wisconsin–Eau Claire announced in a press release that its Barron County branch campus will remain open and a priority for the university. University of Wisconsin–Stevens Point at Wausau dean Gretel Stock stated in 2023 that UW–Stevens Point had no plans to close or significantly modify its branch campuses in Wausau and Marshfield. The next year, University of Wisconsin–Whitewater chancellor Corey King made an announcement that its Rock County branch campus will remain open despite nearby closures.
