= List of college athletic programs in Wisconsin =

This is a list of college athletic programs in the U.S. state of Wisconsin.

== NCAA ==
=== Division I ===
Full NCAA Division I member colleges in Wisconsin.
– FBS Football, – Non-Football

Team	School	City	Conference	Sport sponsorship								
Team	School	City	Conference	Football	Basketball		Baseball	Softball	Ice hockey		Soccer	
Team	School	City	Conference	Football	M	W	Baseball	Softball	M	W	M	W
Green Bay Phoenix	University of Wisconsin-Green Bay	Green Bay	Horizon	No	Yes	Yes	No	Yes	No	No	Yes	Yes
Marquette Golden Eagles	Marquette University	Milwaukee	Big East	No	Yes	Yes	No	No	No	No	Yes	Yes
Milwaukee Panthers	University of Wisconsin-Milwaukee	Milwaukee	Horizon	No	Yes	Yes	Yes	No	No	No	Yes	Yes
Wisconsin Badgers	University of Wisconsin-Madison	Madison	Big Ten	FBS	Yes	Yes	No	Yes	Yes	Yes (Note: Wisconsin's women's ice hockey team competes in the Western Collegiate Hockey Association.)	Yes	Yes

=== Division II ===
Team	School	City	Conference	Sport sponsorship							
Team	School	City	Conference	Basketball		Baseball	Softball	Ice Hockey		Soccer	
Team	School	City	Conference	M	W	Baseball	Softball	M	W	M	W
Parkside Rangers	University of Wisconsin-Parkside	Somers	GLIAC	Yes	Yes	Yes	Yes	No	No	Yes	Yes

=== Division III ===
Team	School	City	Conference	Sport sponsorship								
Team	School	City	Conference	Football	Basketball		Baseball	Softball	Ice hockey		Soccer	
Team	School	City	Conference	Football	M	W	Baseball	Softball	M	W	M	W
Alverno Inferno	Alverno College	Milwaukee	NACC	No	No	Yes	No	Yes	No	No	No	Yes
Beloit Buccaneers	Beloit College	Beloit	Midwest	Yes	Yes	Yes	Yes	Yes	Yes (Note: Beloit and Wisconsin–Superior's ice hockey teams compete in the Wisconsin Intercollegiate Athletic Conference.)	Yes	Yes	Yes
Carroll Pioneers	Carroll University	Waukesha	CCIW	Yes	Yes	Yes	Yes	Yes	No	No	Yes	Yes
Carthage Firebirds	Carthage College	Kenosha	CCIW	Yes	Yes	Yes	Yes	Yes	No	No	Yes	Yes
Concordia Falcons	Concordia University Wisconsin	Mequon	NACC	Yes	Yes	Yes	Yes	Yes	Yes (Note: The men's and women's ice hockey teams of Concordia, Lawrence, Marian, and St. Norbert, as well as the men's ice hockey team of MSOE, compete in the Northern Collegiate Hockey Association.)	Yes	Yes	Yes
Edgewood Eagles	Edgewood University	Madison	NACC	No	Yes	Yes	Yes	Yes	No	No	Yes	Yes
Lakeland Muskies	Lakeland University	Plymouth	NACC	Yes	Yes	Yes	Yes	Yes	No	No	Yes	Yes
Lawrence Vikings	Lawrence University	Appleton	Midwest	Yes	Yes	Yes	Yes	Yes	Yes	Yes	Yes	Yes
Maranatha Baptist Sabercats (Note: Maranatha Baptist also competes in Division II of the National Christian College Athletic Association.)	Maranatha Baptist University	Watertown	Independent	No	Yes	Yes	Yes	Yes	No	No	Yes	Yes
Marian Sabres	Marian University	Fond du Lac	NACC	No	Yes	Yes	Yes	Yes	Yes	Yes	Yes	Yes
MSOE Raiders	Milwaukee School of Engineering	Milwaukee	NACC	No	Yes	Yes	Yes	Yes	Yes	Yes	Yes	Yes
Ripon Red Hawks	Ripon College	Ripon	Midwest	Yes	Yes	Yes	Yes	Yes	No	No	Yes	Yes
St. Norbert Green Knights	St. Norbert College	De Pere	NACC	Yes	Yes	Yes	Yes	Yes	Yes	Yes	Yes	Yes
Wisconsin-Eau Claire Blugolds	University of Wisconsin-Eau Claire	Eau Claire	WIAC	Yes	Yes	Yes	Yes	Yes	Yes	Yes	Yes	Yes
Wisconsin-La Crosse Eagles	University of Wisconsin-La Crosse	La Crosse	WIAC	Yes	Yes	Yes	Yes	Yes	No	No	No	Yes
Wisconsin-Oshkosh Titans	University of Wisconsin-Oshkosh	Oshkosh	WIAC	Yes	Yes	Yes	Yes	Yes	No	No	No	Yes
Wisconsin-Platteville Pioneers	University of Wisconsin-Platteville	Platteville	WIAC	Yes	Yes	Yes	Yes	Yes	No	No	Yes (Note: The men's soccer teams of Wisconsin–Platteville and Wisconsin–Whitewater compete as independents.)	Yes
Wisconsin-River Falls Falcons	University of Wisconsin-River Falls	River Falls	WIAC	Yes	Yes	Yes	Yes	Yes	Yes	Yes	Yes	Yes
Wisconsin-Stevens Point Pointers	University of Wisconsin-Stevens Point	Stevens Point	WIAC	Yes	Yes	Yes	Yes	Yes	Yes	Yes	Yes	Yes
Wisconsin-Stout Blue Devils	University of Wisconsin-Stout	Menomonie	WIAC	Yes	Yes	Yes	Yes	Yes	Yes	No	Yes	Yes
Wisconsin-Superior Yellow Jackets	University of Wisconsin-Superior	Superior	UMAC	No	Yes	Yes	Yes	Yes	Yes	Yes	Yes	Yes
Wisconsin-Whitewater Warhawks	University of Wisconsin-Whitewater	Whitewater	WIAC	Yes	Yes	Yes	Yes	Yes	No	No	Yes	Yes
Wisconsin Lutheran Warriors	Wisconsin Lutheran College	Milwaukee	NACC	Yes	Yes	Yes	Yes	Yes	No	No	Yes	Yes

== NAIA ==
Team	School	City	Conference	Sport sponsorship					
Team	School	City	Conference	Basketball		Baseball	Softball	Soccer	
Team	School	City	Conference	M	W	Baseball	Softball	M	W
Mount Mary Blue Angels	Mount Mary University	Milwaukee	CCAC	No	Yes	No	Yes	No	Yes
Viterbo V-Hawks	Viterbo University	La Crosse	CCAC	Yes	Yes	Yes	Yes	Yes	Yes

== NJCAA ==
Team	School	City	Conference	Sport sponsorship					
Team	School	City	Conference	Basketball		Baseball	Softball	Soccer	
Team	School	City	Conference	M	W	Baseball	Softball	M	W
Bryant & Stratton Bobcats	Bryant & Stratton College	Wauwatosa	Region 4 Independent	Yes (Note: Bryant & Stratton also has a junior varsity men's basketball team that competes in the Wisconsin Collegiate Conference.)	Yes	Yes	Yes	Yes	Yes
Madison College Wolfpack	Madison Area Technical College	Madison	Region 4 Independent	Yes	Yes	Yes	Yes	Yes	Yes
MATC Stormers	Milwaukee Area Technical College	Milwaukee	Region 4 Independent	Yes	Yes	Yes	Yes	Yes	Yes
Southwest Tech Chargers (Note: Southwest Tech's only NJCAA sport is men's golf.)	Southwest Wisconsin Technical College	Fennimore	Region 13 Independent	No	No	No	No	No	No
Western Tech Cavaliers	Western Technical College	La Crosse	MCAC	No	No	Yes	No	No	No

== Wisconsin Collegiate Conference ==
Team	School	City
UWP Baraboo Sauk County Fighting Spirits	University of Wisconsin-Platteville Baraboo Sauk County	Baraboo
UWO-Fond du Lac Falcons	University of Wisconsin-Oshkosh, Fond du Lac Campus	Fond du Lac
UWO-Fox Valley Cyclones	University of Wisconsin-Oshkosh, Fox Cities Campus	Menasha
UWSP Wausau Huskies	University of Wisconsin-Stevens Point at Wausau	Wausau
UWSP Marshfield Marauders	University of Wisconsin-Stevens Point at Marshfield	Marshfield
UWW Rock County Warhawks	University of Wisconsin-Whitewater at Rock County	Janesville

== See also ==
- List of NCAA Division I institutions
- List of NCAA Division II institutions
- List of NCAA Division III institutions
- List of NAIA institutions
- List of USCAA institutions
- List of NCCAA institutions
- List of NJCAA Division I institutions
- List of NJCAA Division II institutions
- List of NJCAA Division III institutions
