= Wisconsin Collegiate Conference =

- Ceased: 2024
- Sports fielded: 2; men's: 1; women's: 1
- No. of teams: 5
- Region: Wisconsin
- Official website: www.wccwis.com

Locations
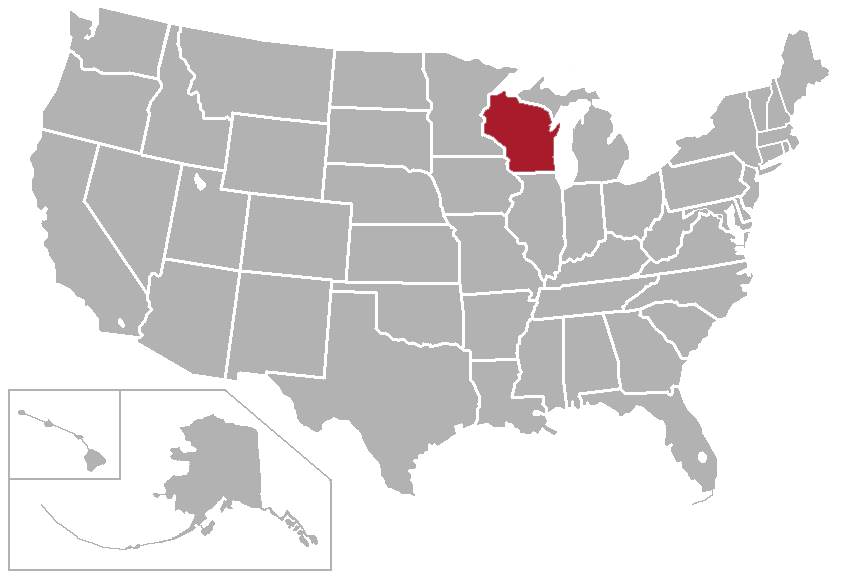

The Wisconsin Collegiate Conference (WCC) was a collegiate athletic conference made up primarily of the branch campuses of the Universities of Wisconsin as well as one private college. The conference sponsored men's and women's basketball, women's volleyball, co-ed soccer, men's tennis, and men's golf. All schools were junior colleges and athletes were only eligible for two years.

In 2020, after all schools suspended athletic events due to the COVID-19 pandemic, the WCC went on hiatus. Ahead of the 2021–22 season, the satellite campuses of UW-Green Bay, UW-Oshkosh, and UW-Stevens Point formed a new conference, the Wisconsin Competitive Sports League.

The WCC returned for the 2023–24 season, with only the Oshkosh, Stevens Point, Whitewater, and Platteville campuses returning (apart from Platteville's Richland campus, which closed in 2023). The only sports that returned were volleyball and men's basketball. The junior varsity men's basketball squad at Bryant & Stratton College's Wisconsin campuses also joined, becoming the first campus outside the UW System to join the conference.

Following the season, the league quietly folded as UW-Oshkosh's Fond du Lac campus closed, while Whitewater's Rock County campus left for the NJCAA and added more sports. Among the other final members, Stevens Point at Wausau disbanded their athletic program as they prepared to move operations to Northcentral Technical College, Oshkosh's Fox Cities campus closed in 2025, and Stevens Point at Marshfield and Platteville Baraboo Sauk County joined other Wisconsin schools to re-form the Wisconsin Competitive Sports League.

== Member schools ==
=== Final full members ===
Member schools
- Associate member
1 Oshkosh, Fox Cities Campus
2 Platteville Baraboo Sauk County
3 Stevens Point at Wausau
4 Stevens Point at Marshfield
5 Bryant & Stratton Wisconsin

Institution	Location	Founded	Enrollment	Nickname	Colors
UW–Platteville Baraboo Sauk County	Baraboo, Wisconsin	1968	348	Fighting Spirits	
UW–Stevens Point at Wausau	Wausau, Wisconsin	1933	575	Huskies	
UW–Stevens Point at Marshfield	Marshfield, Wisconsin	1963	421	Mauraders	
UW–Oshkosh, Fox Cities Campus	Menasha, Wisconsin	1960	1,132	Cyclones	

=== Final associate members ===
Institution	Location	Founded	Enrollment	Nickname	Colors	Primary conference	WCC sport
Bryant & Stratton College Wisconsin	Glendale, Racine, and Wauwatosa, Wisconsin	1854	1,502	Bobcats		NJCAA Region 4	Men's basketball (Note: Junior varsity team only.)

=== Former ===
Institution	Location	Founded	Left	Enrollment	Nickname	Colors	Fate
UW–Eau Claire – Barron County	Rice Lake, Wisconsin	1966	2020	434	Chargers		Disbanded athletic program
UW–Platteville Richland	Richland Center, Wisconsin	1967	2020	155	Roadrunners		Campus closed
UW–Green Bay, Manitowoc Campus	Manitowoc, Wisconsin	1933	2020	218	Blue Devils		Disbanded athletic program
UW–Green Bay, Marinette Campus	Marinette, Wisconsin	1935	2020	198	Buccaneers		Disbanded athletic program
UW–Green Bay, Sheboygan Campus	Sheboygan, Wisconsin	1933	2020	359	Wombats		Disbanded athletic program
UW–Milwaukee at Washington County	West Bend, Wisconsin	1968	2020	605	Wildcats		Disbanded athletic program
UW–Milwaukee at Waukesha	Waukesha, Wisconsin	1966	2020	1,541	Cougars		Disbanded athletic program
UW–Oshkosh, Fond du Lac Campus	Fond du Lac, Wisconsin	1968	2024	435	Falcons		Campus closed
UW–Whitewater at Rock County	Janesville, Wisconsin	1966	2024	865	Warhawks (Note: Were known as the Rattlers until becoming a branch of UW-Whitewater in 2018.)		Moved to NJCAA Region 13

== Sponsored sports by school ==
=== 2023–2024 ===
School	Men's basketball	Women's volleyball	Total
Baraboo Sauk County	✓	✓	2
Bryant & Stratton	✓	✗	1
Fond du Lac	✓	✓	2
Fox Cities	✓	✓	2
Marshfield	✓	✓	2
Rock County	✗	✓	1
Wausau	✓	✓	2
Total	6	6	12

=== Before 2020 ===
School	Co-ed soccer	Men's basketball	Women's basketball	Women's volleyball	Total
Baraboo/Sauk County	✗	✓	✗	✗	1
Barron County	✗	✓	✓	✓	3
Wausau	✓	✓	✓	✓	4
Marshfield	✗	✓	✓	✓	3
Richland	✗	✓	✓	✓	3
Rock County	✗	✓	✗	✗	1
Fond du Lac	✓	✓	✗	✗	2
Fox Cities	✓	✓	✓	✓	4
Manitowoc	✗	✓	✗	✗	1
Marinette	✗	✓	✓	✓	3
Sheboygan	✗	✓	✗	✓	2
Washington County	✓	✓	✓	✓	4
Waukesha	✓	✓	✗	✗	2
Total	5	13	7	8	33
