= University of Wisconsin Colleges =

University of Wisconsin–Colleges
- Type: Public university system
- Active: 1971–June 30, 2018
- Parent institution: University of Wisconsin System
- Accreditation: HLC
- Chancellor: Cathy A. Sandeen
- Academic staff: 531
- Administrative staff: 61
- Total staff: 362
- Students: 11,608
- Location: Madison, Wisconsin, United States
- Website: www.wisc.edu/uwc

The University of Wisconsin Colleges was, from 1971 to 2018, a unit of the University of Wisconsin System composed of 13 local two-year campuses and one online campus. These campuses offered a liberal arts, transfer-parallel curriculum. The unit was established in 1971 and was dissolved on June 30, 2018.

The campuses were then made affiliates of some of the four-year campuses of the University of Wisconsin System, although many of them have since been closed or are in the process of closing.

== History ==
In 1940, the University of Wisconsin-Extension began operating freshman-sophomore centers across the state. After World War II, the UW Board of Regents encouraged counties and municipalities to donate land for this purpose, mainly to serve the influx of students enrolling after the war. After the 1971 merger of the University of Wisconsin System with the Wisconsin State Universities System to form the present-day UW System, the freshman-sophomore centers became a separate institution of the newly created system known as the University of Wisconsin Centers. The centers became known as University of Wisconsin Colleges in 1997.

In 2005, the Board of Regents partially reunited UW Colleges with UW-Extension. Although the two units shared a single administration, they had separate provosts and retained separate identities.

The last chancellor of both UW Colleges and UW-Extension was Cathy Sandeen.

=== Restructuring ===
Due to years of declining enrollment, the UW Board of Regents voted on November 9, 2017 to proceed with a proposal that merged the physical University of Wisconsin Colleges campuses with seven of the four-year campuses of the University of Wisconsin System. The merger created regional clusters in which the two-year universities renamed and became branches of the comprehensive four-year campuses. It would allow the system to maintain a higher education presence throughout the state's counties where college-aged students had dropped because of declining birthrates. The resulting merger also allowed students to freely transfer from a two-year campus to any four-year institution within the university system.

=== Post-restructuring closures ===
Following the spring 2023 semester, the University of Wisconsin-Platteville Richland became the first branch campus to close following the restructuring, citing enrollment decline.

In October 2023, UW System President Jay Rothman recommended that the branch campuses be eventually phased out as associate-granting institutions in favor of coordinating with the Wisconsin Technical College System so students can pursue liberal arts coursework there. For each branch campus in question that continues to operate afterwards, it was suggested that they sell some of their facilities and pivot to primarily providing dual enrollment opportunities for high school students and non-credit corporate training opportunities for local employers.

== Campuses ==
Main campuses as of 2018
1 Baraboo/Sauk County
2 Barron County
3 Fond Du Lac
4 Fox Valley
5 Manitowoc
6 Marathon County
7 Marinette
8 Marshfield/Wood County
9 Richland
10 Rock County
11 Sheboygan
12 Washington County
13 Waukesha

As of 2018, the campuses were the following:

- University of Wisconsin Colleges Online (replaced by an Associate of Arts and Sciences program offered by the University of Wisconsin Extended Campus)
- University of Wisconsin–Baraboo/Sauk County
- University of Wisconsin–Barron County
- University of Wisconsin–Fond du Lac
- University of Wisconsin–Fox Valley
- University of Wisconsin–Manitowoc
- University of Wisconsin–Marathon County
- University of Wisconsin–Marinette
- University of Wisconsin–Marshfield/Wood County
- University of Wisconsin–Richland
- University of Wisconsin–Rock County
- University of Wisconsin–Sheboygan
- University of Wisconsin–Washington County
- University of Wisconsin–Waukesha

An associate degree could be earned at any of the campuses, including the online campus. As of 2013, six of the campuses offered a Bachelor of Applied Arts and Sciences degree. The UW Colleges were also frequently used as a stepping stone in order to transfer to another institution in the University of Wisconsin System. This was facilitated by the "Guaranteed Transfer Program" whereby a student was guaranteed admission as a junior to another institution if certain requirements are met.

== See also ==
- Wisconsin Technical College System
- Career and technical education
