= Neal Nelson =

Current position
- Title: Head coach
- Team: University of Wisconsin-Waukesha Cougars
- Conference: Wisconsin Collegiate Conference

Biographical details
- Born: Dodgeville, Wisconsin

Playing career
- 1965–1969: University of Wisconsin–La Crosse
- Position: Point guard

Accomplishments and honors

Championships
- Wisconsin Collegiate Conference WJCCA 5 time state champion (1980-1981, 2001-2002, 2006-2007, 2009-2010, 2011-2012)

Awards
- Wisconsin Coaches Hall of Fame (Elected in 2012)

Neal Nelson is a basketball, tennis, and golf coach, as well as an associate professor at the University of Wisconsin–Waukesha. He is most well known for his basketball coaching accomplishments, such as a career at UW-Waukesha with over 500 wins, and 5 Wisconsin Collegiate Conference state titles. In 2012, he was elected into the Wisconsin Coaches Hall of Fame.

Nelson played multiple sports at a young age, he went on to play collegiate basketball at University of Wisconsin–La Crosse where he earned his B.A. In Physical Education. He then went on to Adams State University in Colorado to earn his Masters.

Following the end of the state championship season in 2011–2012, Nelson announced that he would be retiring after the completion of the 2012–2013 season. In his last season, he led the Cougars into the State regionals, but finished his last game with a loss against University of Wisconsin-Manitowoc.

Nelson's coaching style is known for his use and success with the high-low offense, and his detailed man-to-man defense. Much of his coaching philosophy is modeled after Bo Ryan, who he is known to be friends with, and is a big fan of. Nelson has worked with many assistant coaches during his career including author and IT Specialist, Michael Karger.

== See also ==
- University of Wisconsin–La Crosse
- Adams State University
