= University of Wisconsin–Stevens Point at Marshfield =

University campus in Wisconsin, U.S.

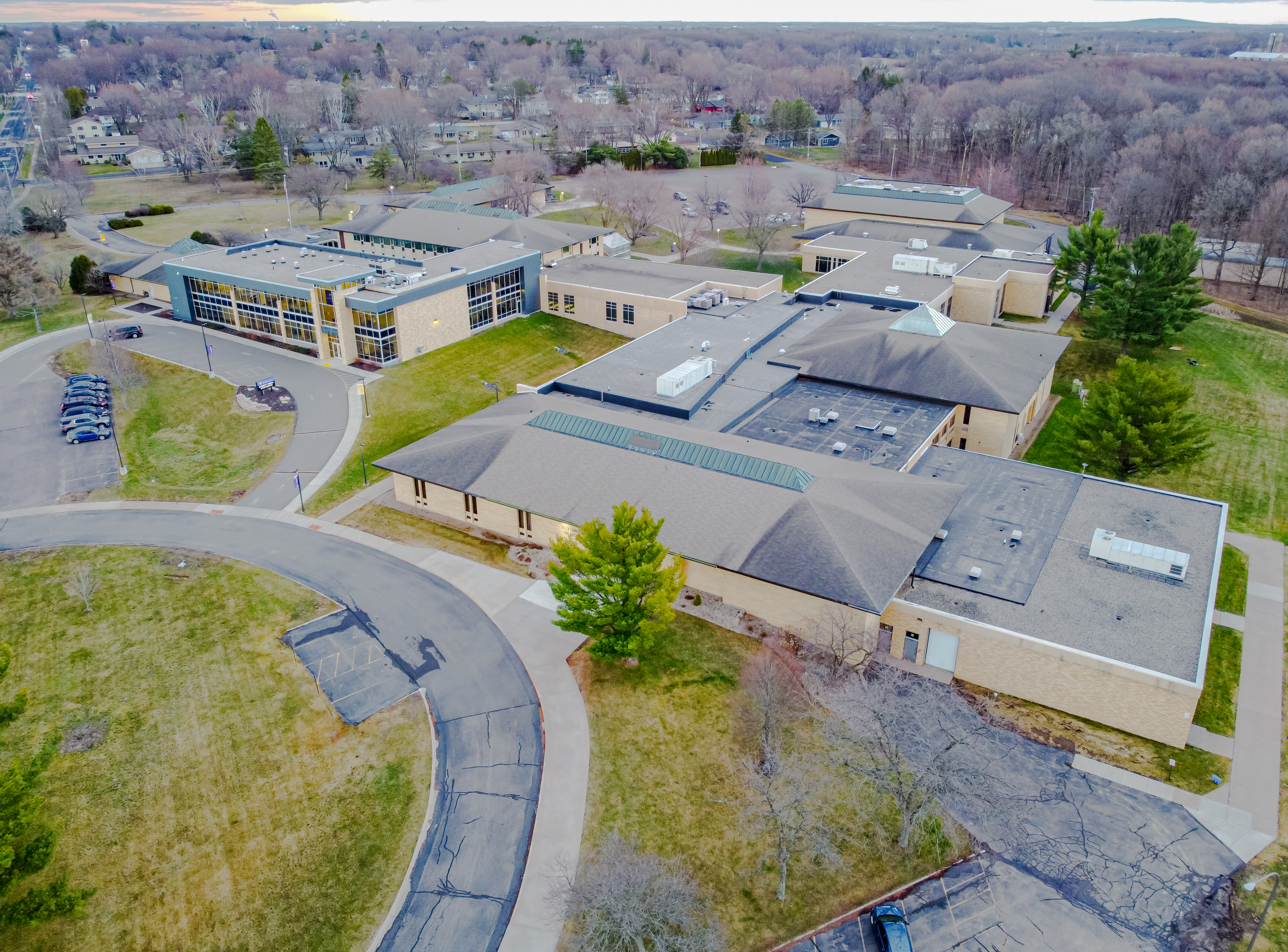
- Type: State university
- Established: 1963
- Undergraduates: 650
- Location: Marshfield, Wisconsin, USA; 44.665470°N 90.204972°W
- Campus: Rural
- Colors: Blue and Yellow
- Nickname: Marshfield Marauders
- Website: www.uwsp.edu/marshfield

The University of Wisconsin–Stevens Point at Marshfield (UWSP at Marshfield and formerly University of Wisconsin–Marshfield/Wood County), is a satellite campus of the University of Wisconsin–Stevens Point located in Marshfield, Wisconsin, USA.

== History ==
The campus was established in 1963 as an extension of the University of Wisconsin–Madison. The original campus consisted of three buildings and was expanded to six buildings in 1971. In 1973, the current University of Wisconsin System was formed with UW–Marshfield/Wood County becoming one of 14 charter University of Wisconsin Center two-year campuses. The campus was a member of the University of Wisconsin Colleges until July 1, 2018, when UW-Marshfield/Wood County and UW-Marathon County became satellite campuses of the University of Wisconsin-Stevens Point. On August 24, 2018, the UW System Regents approved renaming UW-Marshfield/Wood County as the University of Wisconsin–Stevens Point at Marshfield.

== School ==
UWSP at Marshfield offers a general education associate degree and a Bachelor in Applied Arts and Sciences (BAAS) degree. After beginning studies at UWSP at Marshfield, students may transfer to the main UWSP campus, other UW System institutions, or colleges and universities throughout the country to complete their bachelor's degrees, or complete the BAAS at UWSP at Marshfield.

The campus enrolled 91 full-time equivalent students in Fall of 2025, down from 446 in 2012. (2025). As of 2026, Anthony Andrews is the campus executive.

== Campus ==
The campus, west of downtown Marshfield, Wisconsin, includes a 114-acre (46 ha) arboretum, a 340-seat theater, an arts center and specialist science accommodation. The campus underwent a $5.1 million expansion and remodeling project in 1998.

Wood County and the City of Marshfield, owners of the land and buildings on the campus, each contributed $1 million towards the Roehl STEM Center, which opened in 2018.

https://www.marshfieldnewsherald.com/story/news/2018/04/14/streetwise-roundup-everett-roehl-stem-center-earns-statewide-recognition/512285002/

== Athletics ==
Students may compete in six varsity sports in the Wisconsin Collegiate Conference: women's volleyball, men and women's basketball, men and women's tennis, and men's golf.

During the 2012 season, the women's volleyball won a share of the WCC Western Division Championship with a record of 9-2 (3-1). In the 2012–2013 season, the men's team finished with a record of 19-5 (9-1), winning the WCC Western Division title and advancing to the WCC State Tournament Final Four. That same year, the women's team finished with a record of 24-2 (19-1), winning the WCC regular season title and WCC State Championship.
