= Barlow Planetarium =

Planetarium in Menasha, Wisconsin

Coordinates: 44.229778°N 88.415225°W

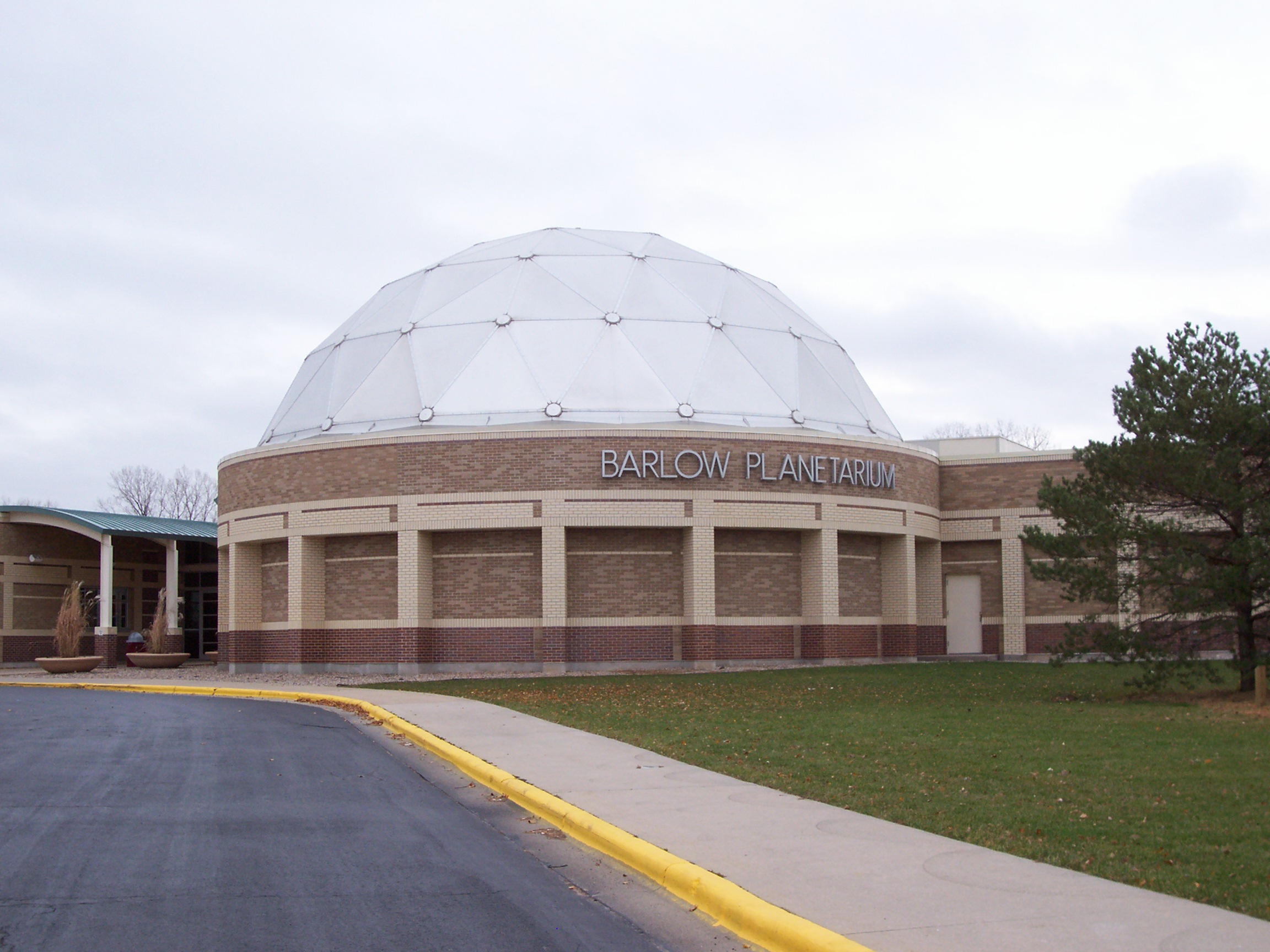
Barlow Planetarium

The Barlow Planetarium is a planetarium located at the Winnebago County, Fox Cities Campus in Menasha, Wisconsin. Established in 1998, it was the first major planetarium in Wisconsin. It is named after late businessman and mineral collector F. John Barlow.

== History ==
Barlow Planetarium takes its name from F. John Barlow, who was the largest private donor to the building of the planetarium. The planetarium opened in March 1998. Its premiere show was "Through the Eyes of Hubble", a program detailing the Hubble Space Telescope's servicing mission and first few years of operation.

== Facilities ==
The planetarium has a 102-person seating capacity (98 regular chairs, 4 wheelchair positions). The Barlow has panorama slide projectors and an all-sky system (an all-sky image is a series of six pie-shaped images that are aligned to make a picture fill the dome). Video images can be projected onto the dome from DVD or computer. The planetarium is powered by a Digistar II star projector. In 2004 the Barlow acquired a laser projection system that uses a three-color argon laser to draw images set to music on the dome. In 2018, the laser system was upgraded to a SkyLase 360° projector by Audio-Visual Imagineering. The planetarium also has a 10,000-watt sound system.
