= University of Wisconsin–Oshkosh, Fox Cities Campus =

Public college in Menasha, Wisconsin, U.S.

Coordinates: 44°13′51.97″N 88°25′0.74″W

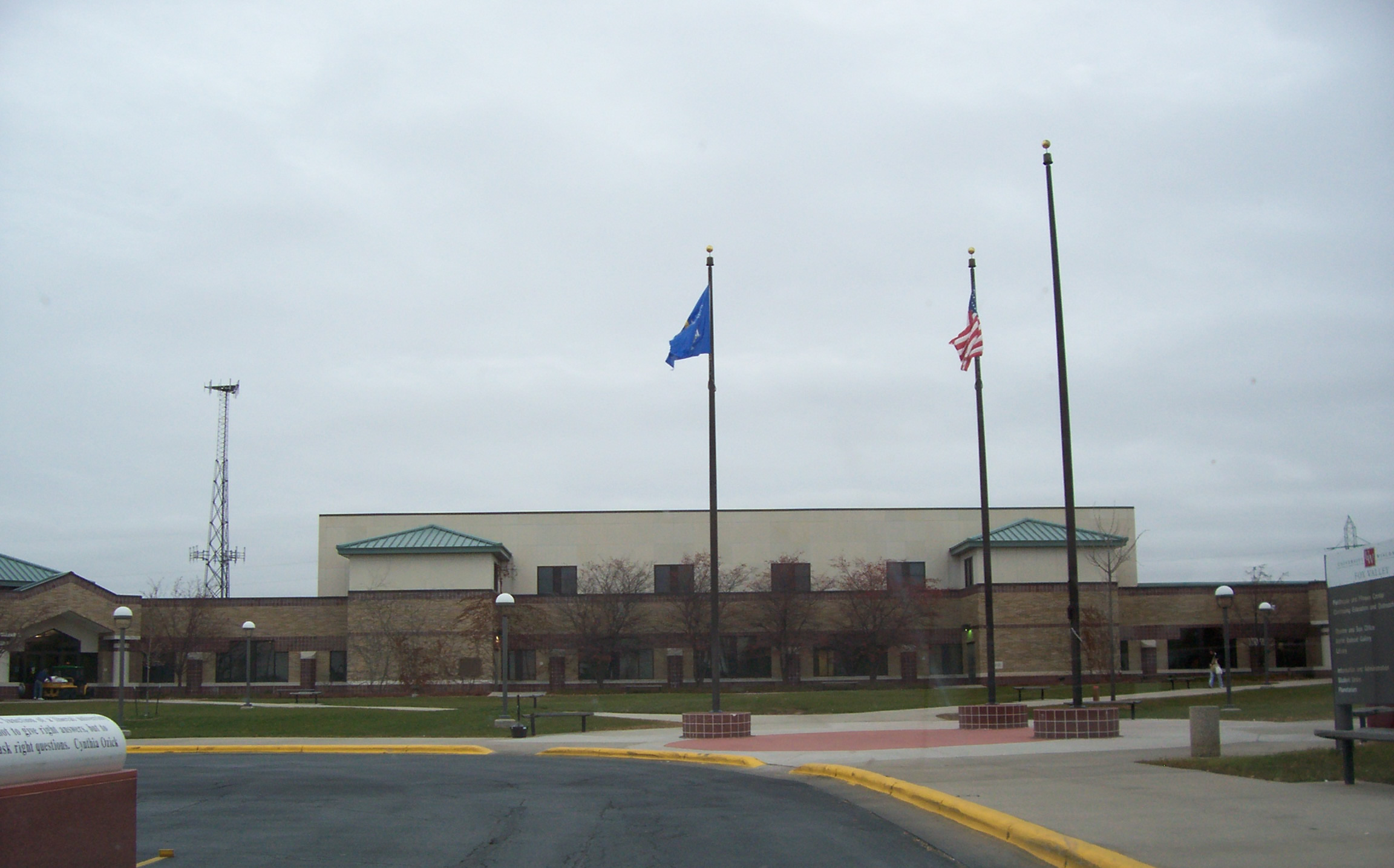
- Former mall and entrance, pictured in 2006
- Other name: UWO Fox Cities
- Former names: Menasha Extension Center; University of Wisconsin Fox Valley Center; University of Wisconsin–Fox Valley
- Type: Public liberal arts college
- Active: 1933–2025
- Parent institution: University of Wisconsin System
- Accreditation: HLC
- Affiliations: University of Wisconsin–Oshkosh
- Location: Menasha, Wisconsin, United States
- Campus: 40 acres (16.2 ha); Urban
- Colors: Gold, black, and white
- Nickname: Cyclones
- Sporting affiliations: Wisconsin Collegiate Conference

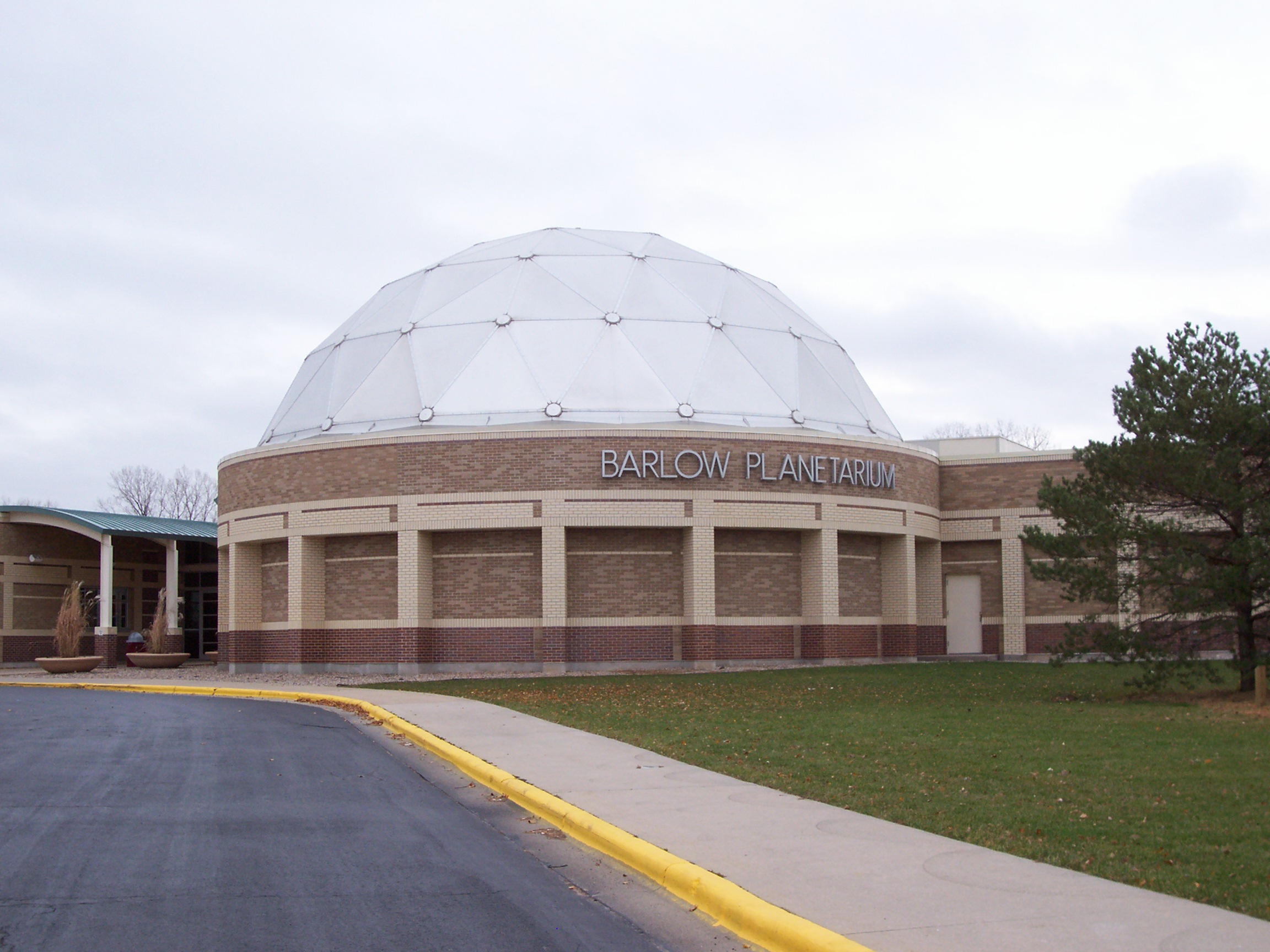
Barlow Planetarium

The University of Wisconsin–Oshkosh, Fox Cities Campus was a branch campus of the University of Wisconsin–Oshkosh in Menasha, Wisconsin. A member of the University of Wisconsin System, the campus was located on a 41 acres (17 ha) campus in Menasha. It was established in 1933 and closed in 2025 as part of a larger cut in regional campuses throughout the University of Wisconsin System. Prior to its merger with the University of Wisconsin–Oshkosh in 2018, the campus was a member of the University of Wisconsin Colleges.

== History ==
On June 13, 2024, it was announced that the University of Wisconsin–Oshkosh, Fox Cities Campus would close at the end of the spring 2025 semester. UW–Oshkosh's chancellor Andrew Leavitt announced this decision, citing lowering student participation rates and the changing state of higher education as the reasons for its closure, calling it "a difficult but responsible decision." A UW–Oshkosh projection estimated enrollment would drop below 100 students by 2032. Its enrollment in 2024 was 473.

== Campus ==
The former Fox Cities Campus is home to the Barlow Planetarium, a facility with a Digistar II 3-D projector, and the Weis Earth Science Museum, the official state mineralogical museum of Wisconsin. The $14 million Communication Arts Center was opened in 2009. The 51,000-square-foot (4,700 m^{2}) building was the first LEED-certified academic building in the University of Wisconsin System.

== Academics ==
The campus offered courses to begin any one of over 250 academic majors, leading to either an associate's degree with emphases in 25 areas, or the Guaranteed Transfer Program, under which students are guaranteed admission to a four-year UW campus of their choice if they met certain academic requirements. The Fox Cities campus also collaborated with other UW schools to offer bachelor's degrees.

== Athletics ==
The Fox Cities Campus sponsored teams in women's volleyball, men's basketball, golf, tennis, and soccer as a member of the independent Wisconsin Collegiate Conference. Its campus mascot was the cyclone and the campus colors were gold, black and white. Prior to becoming a branch campus of UW–Oshkosh, the teams used maroon and black as their primary colors.
