= University of Wisconsin–Platteville Baraboo Sauk County =

Public college in Baraboo, Wisconsin, U.S.

Coordinates: 43.4828°N 89.7621°W

University of Wisconsin Platteville–Baraboo Sauk County
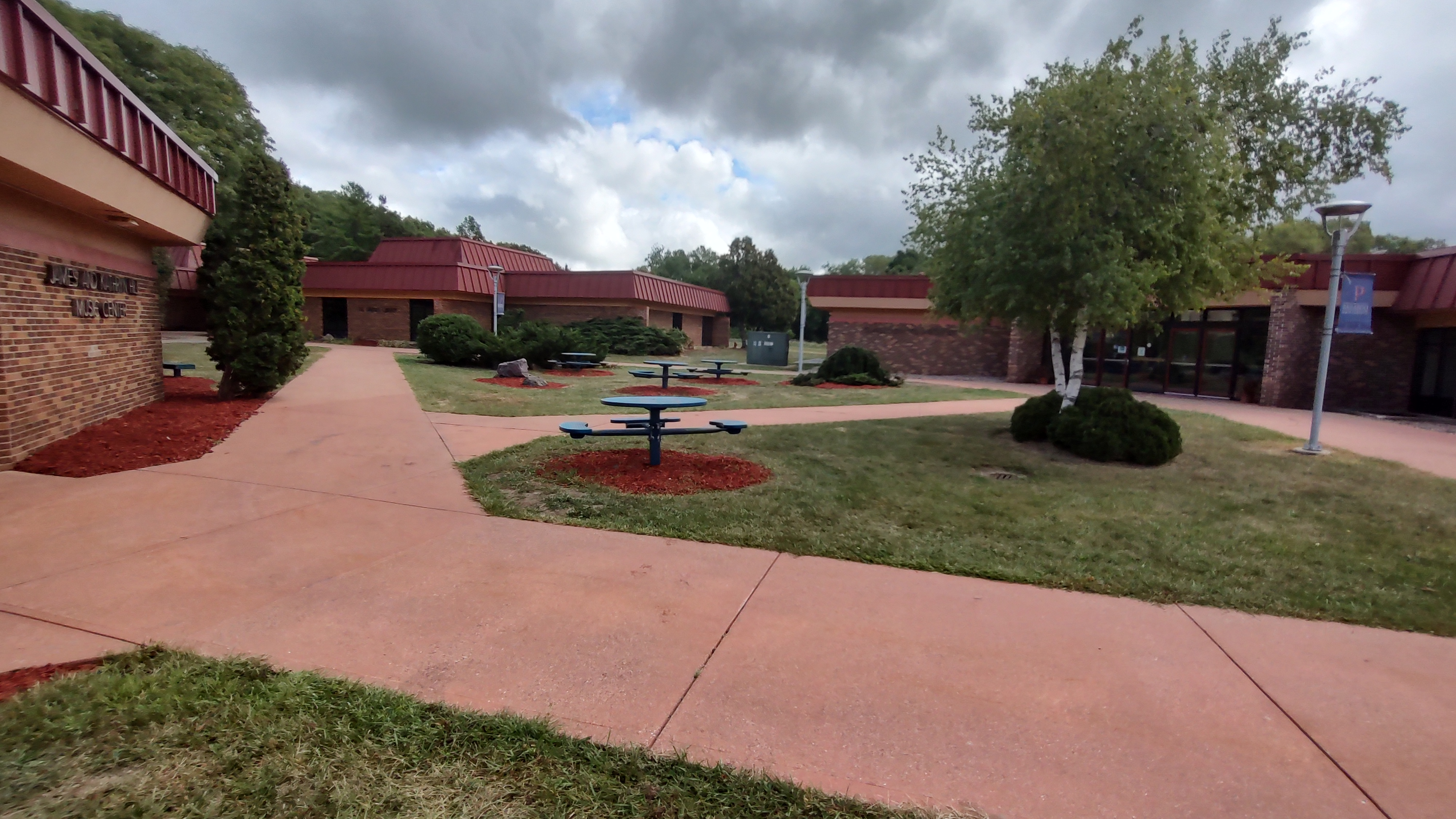
- Other names: UW Baraboo, Boo U
- Former name: University of Wisconsin–Baraboo/Sauk County
- Active: 1968–2026
- Parent institution: University of Wisconsin-Platteville
- Location: Baraboo, Wisconsin, United States
- Campus: 68 acres (28 ha); Small town
- Nickname: Fighting Spirits
- Sporting affiliations: WCC
- Website: uwplatt.edu/baraboo

The University of Wisconsin–Platteville Baraboo Sauk County (UW-Baraboo or Boo-U) was a branch campus of the University of Wisconsin–Platteville, located in Baraboo, Wisconsin. Founded in 1968, it was known as University of Wisconsin–Baraboo/Sauk County and was a part of the University of Wisconsin Colleges. It joined UW-Platteville in 2018 as a branch campus following dissolution of the UW-Colleges system. The university offered two associate degrees and a bachelor's degree entirely on campus, while students had the option of changing campuses to Platteville main or online for additional degree programs.

The 68-acre (28 ha) campus overlooks the Baraboo bluffs and is intersected by the Ice Age Trail. Six buildings comprised the campus, including student dorms, a student union, a library, and classroom buildings. The university was originally built with three buildings and has expanded over the years, including its most recent building in 2015.

Originally designed for 300 students, the campus saw increasing enrollment through 2000, peaking at 758. However, there were only 178 undergraduates in 2024.

The campus held its final classes in May 2026.

== History ==
The university opened in the fall of 1968, as a freshman-sophomore campus as part of the University of Wisconsin Colleges system. The university is jointly owned by the UW system, Sauk County, and City of Baraboo. It was originally designed for 300 students. Circa the mid-to-late 20th century West Baraboo did not financially contribute to UW–Baraboo.

Starting in 1974, the university provided college education to prisoners at the Federal Correctional Institution in Oxford. The program granted 2 year Associate of Arts and Sciences degree and 1-year certificates in Business or Computer Science. The program ended in 2009.

The late 90s saw several expansion projects on campus. With a donation from John and Murrel Lange in 1995, a new student union was built. It included a gymnasium, cafeteria, and student services. In 1996 renovations occurred in all major classroom buildings. The same year, with a donation from the Hill family, a new music center was built including practice rooms and a rehearsal hall.

A dormitory was built in 2014.

A new science building was built in 2015, named in honor of former dean Thomas C. Pleger.

In 2017 the six tennis courts of Baraboo High were in disrepair because of soil conditions, with two of the courts severely damaged. At that time the district was discussing with UW–Baraboo the possibility of having new tennis courts built on the college property with the district sharing the courts; the college would have eight courts, with the district building four of them.

Prior to July 1, 2018, UW–Baraboo/Sauk County was one of 13 freshman-sophomore liberal arts transfer campuses of the UW Colleges, and offers a general education associate degree. After beginning their studies at UW–Platteville Baraboo Sauk County, students transfer to other UW System institutions as well as to colleges and universities throughout the country to complete their bachelor's degrees. In 2013, the college had an average class size of 22.5 students.

On July 1, 2018, the campus formally merged with UW–Platteville, a four-year comprehensive university that is part of the University of Wisconsin System. At that time it received its current name.

== Campus ==
The campus opened in 1968 with three buildings–a classroom building, student center, and library. The classroom building, now known as the Aural M. Umhoefer building, includes a large lecture hall alongside several smaller classrooms. It was named after former dean Aural Umhoefer.

The Lange Center houses athletic facilities, including a gymnasium, racquetball courts, fitness center, weight room, dance studio, and locker rooms. It also houses a cafeteria, student services, and an art gallery.

The fine arts building houses an art studio, classroom, and theater. It is adjacent to the James and Kathryn Hill Music Center, which includes a rehearsal hall and music practice rooms.

The T.N. Savides Library is located next to the classroom building. It has been closed since 2024.

The south side of campus is home to tennis courts and a field used for several sports. The campus is also home to the 18 hole Baraboo Lions Disc Golf Course, which was built in 1996.

The campus is adjacent to Baraboo High School, Jack Young Middle School, and Gordon K. Willson Elementary School. The only passage between the City of Baraboo and UW–Platteville Baraboo Sauk County is through West Baraboo.

The Ice Age Trail runs through the campus. Additionally, there are several other trails open for hiking in the campus woods.

== Academics ==
In its final years, the university offered two associate degrees and one bachelor's degree in Business Management. Its Associate of Arts and Sciences degree fulfilled the first two years at the Platteville campus, and was generally accepted at most other universities. It offered two business degrees, one Associate of Science in Business Administration, and a Bachelor of Business Administration in Management. The bachelor's degree was offered as a "hybrid" degree, with many of the required classes being fulfilled through the online campus of UW Platteville.

== Athletics ==
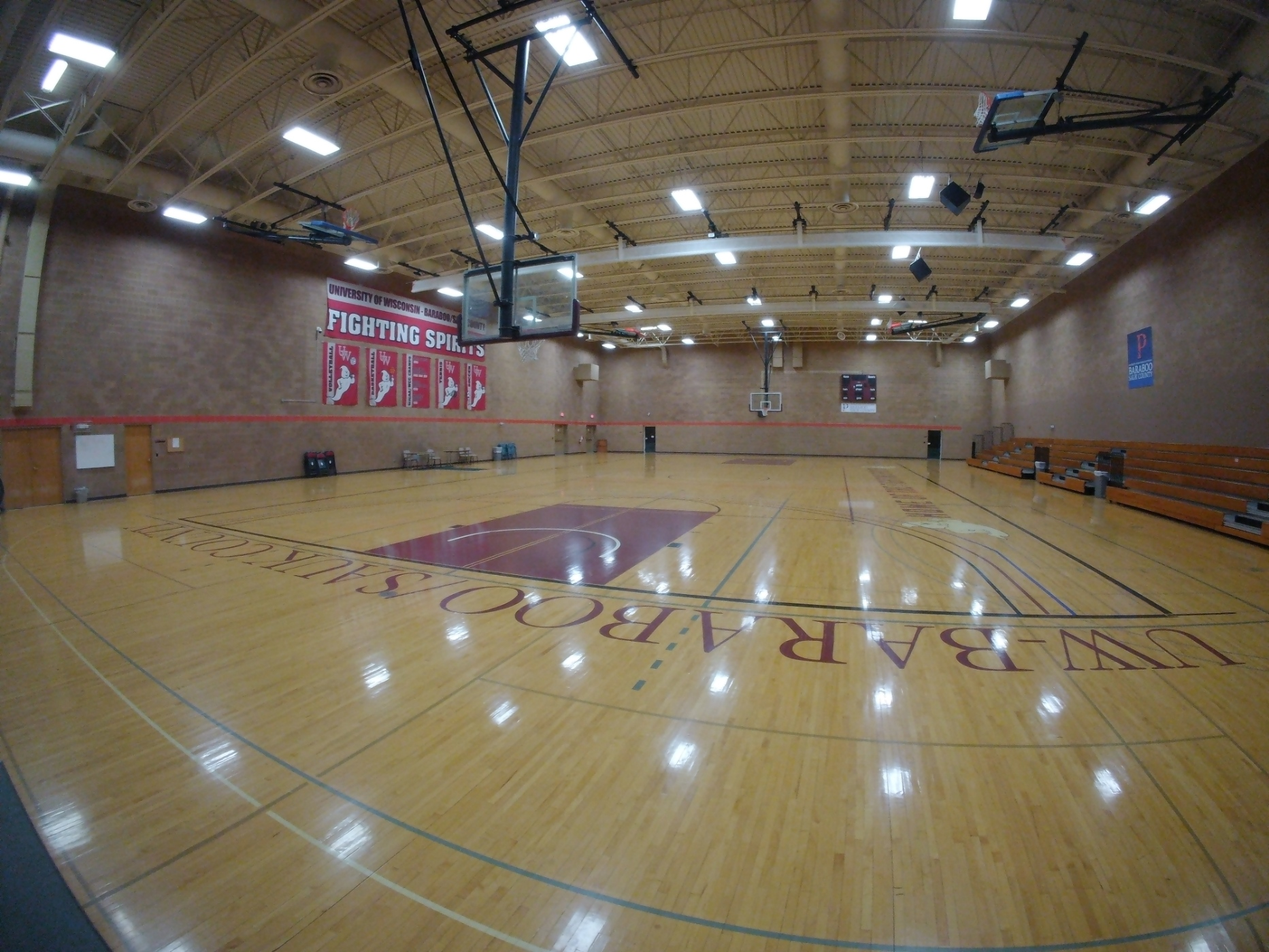
The gymnasium, located in the John and Murrel Lange Center building.

The university was a member of the Wisconsin Collegiate Conference. From 2020 until its closure, the university offered men's basketball and woman's volleyball. Previously, the university offered cross country, wrestling, golf and tennis.
