= University of Wisconsin–Oshkosh, Fond du Lac Campus =

Public university in the U.S. (1968–2024)

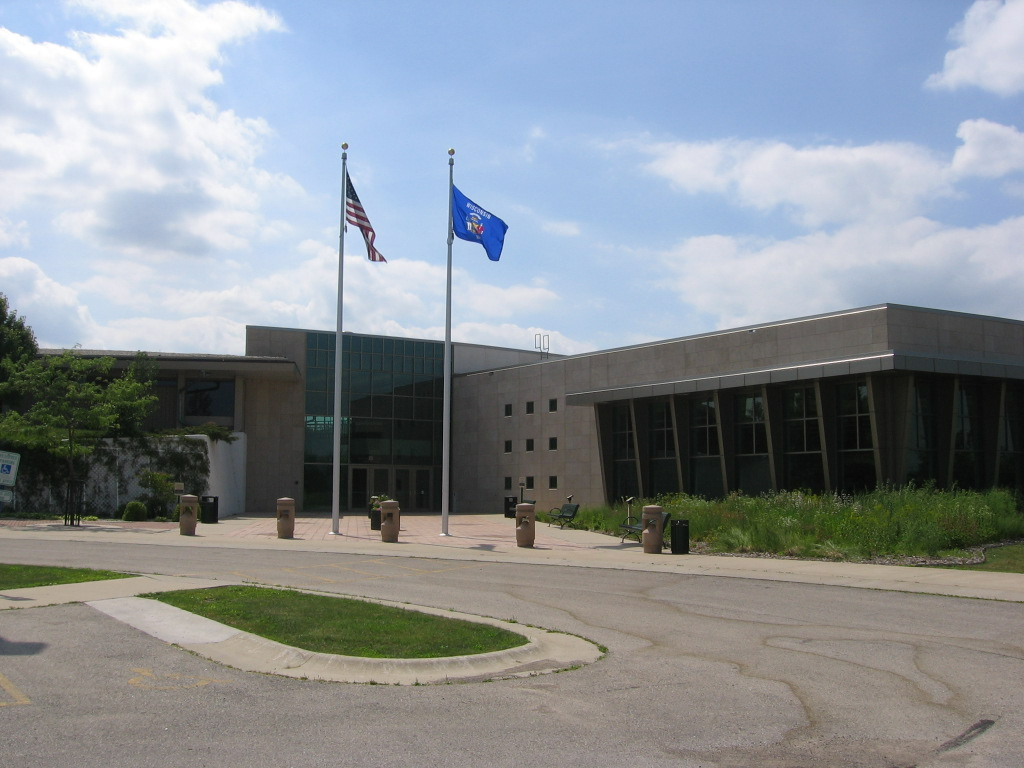
- Main entrance
- Other name: UWO Fond du Lac
- Former name: University of Wisconsin–Fond du Lac
- Type: Public liberal arts college
- Active: September 9, 1968–May 17, 2024; 2 years ago
- Parent institution: Universities of Wisconsin
- Accreditation: HLC
- Affiliations: University of Wisconsin–Oshkosh
- Location: Fond du Lac, Wisconsin, United States; 43.7894339°N 88.4142726°W
- Campus: 62 acres (25 ha); Rural
- Colors: Gold, black, and white
- Nickname: Falcons
- Sporting affiliations: Wisconsin Collegiate Conference
- Website: https://uwosh.edu/fdl/

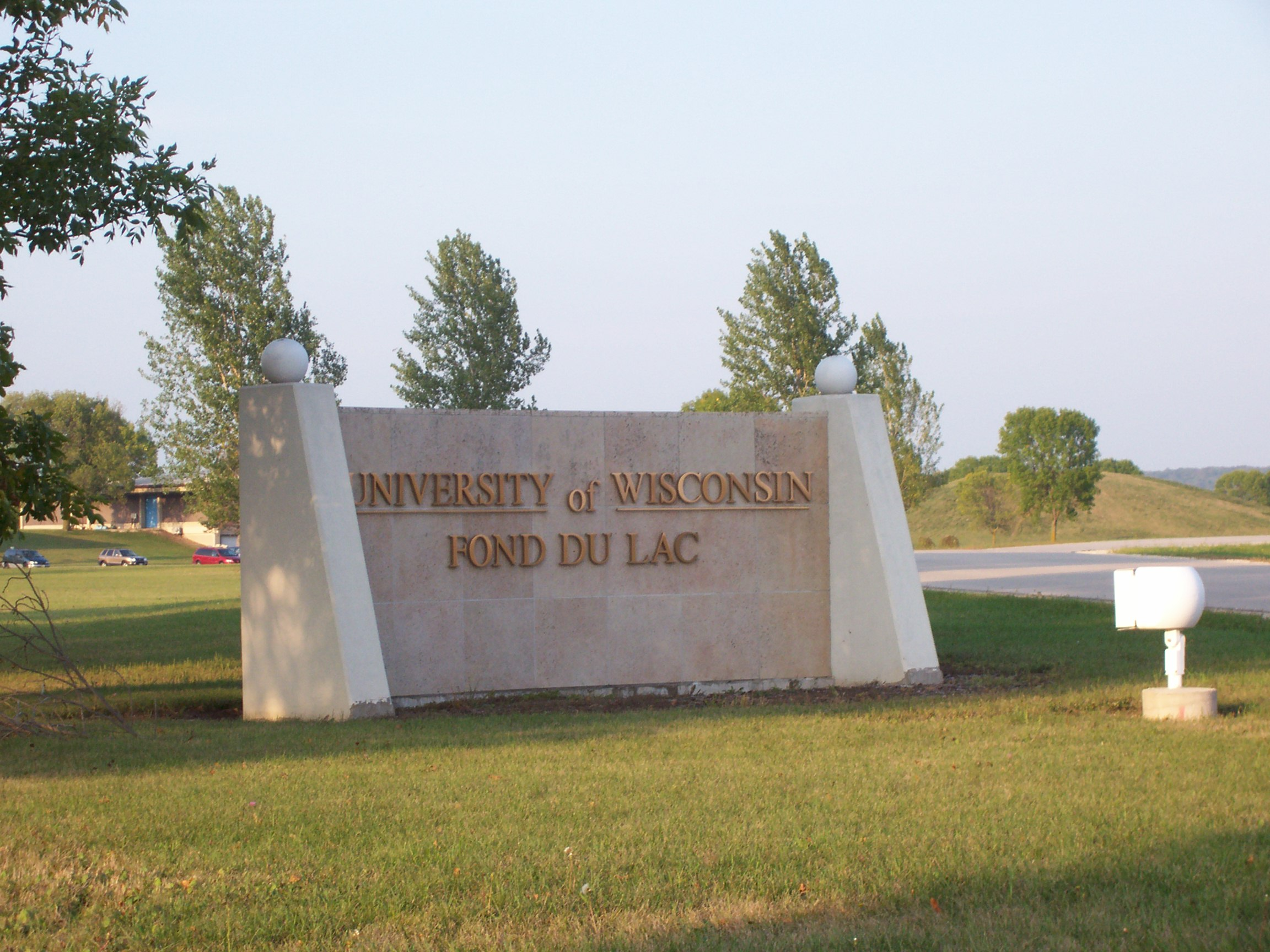
Welcome sign for UWO Fond du Lac with the former name, 2006

The University of Wisconsin–Oshkosh, Fond du Lac Campus (abbreviated as UWO Fond du Lac and formerly the University of Wisconsin–Fond du Lac) was a branch campus of the University of Wisconsin–Oshkosh and a member of the Universities of Wisconsin. It was located on 62 acres (25 ha) in Fond du Lac, Wisconsin, United States.

Prior to its merger with UW–Oshkosh in July 2018, the campus was a member of the University of Wisconsin Colleges. As of 2022, the campus enrolled 258 students, making it the third-smallest of the UW branch campuses.

The campus closed in May 2024, with the Universities of Wisconsin citing enrollment and cost issues.

== History ==
The beginnings of the campus are rooted in the 1950s when the University of Wisconsin–Madison operated an extension campus in Fond du Lac. By the beginning of the 1960s, however, that venture had ended, and local community organizers were hoping to bring a fully operating campus to the community. Setting up a joint commission between the city and county, they successfully lobbied for the building of a campus and set aside land in 1966, the previous home of the Fond du Lac County Airport on the city's east side.

The campus opened as a satellite campus of UW–Oshkosh on September 9, 1968. Its total cost to build was $5 million ($49.6 million in 2025). It became an independent two-year campus in 1972.

As part of a $13 million renovation, the campus saw the addition of a student commons, 300-seat Prairie Theater, and renovation of the original buildings in the fall of 2000.

In July 2018, the University of Wisconsin Colleges system restructured, and UW–Fond du Lac once again became a satellite campus of UW–Oshkosh.

== Closure ==
On October 17, 2023, Universities of Wisconsin President Jay Rothman announced that the University of Wisconsin–Oshkosh, Fond du Lac Campus would close at the end of June 2024. Its enrollment was 243 in its final year. The campus held its final class on May 17, 2024, with all faculty transferring to the main Oshkosh campus and students given the option to transfer to the main campus or Fox Cities campus. The Fond du Lac campus was reused as community spaces by the county. Its theatre, gymnasium, and classrooms are available for use by the community. Alongside these community spaces, county offices and law enforcement training was brought to the campus.

== Academics ==
UWO Fond du Lac's primary offering was the associate of arts and science degree, a two-year degree to provide prerequisites to four-year UW schools. The campus also offered certain bachelor's degrees in collaboration with UW-Milwaukee and UW-Platteville.

== Athletics ==
UWO Fond du Lac sponsored teams in women's volleyball and men's basketball as a member of the independent Wisconsin Collegiate Conference. Its campus mascot was the falcon and the campus colors were identical to UW-Oshkosh's gold, black and white.

Prior to becoming a branch campus of UW–Oshkosh, the teams used green and black as their primary colors.

== Notable alumni ==
- Terri McCormick, state representative and candidate for the U.S. House of Representatives
