= Northcentral Technical College =

Public community college in Wausau, Wisconsin, U.S.

Coordinates: 44°50′10″N 89°38′42″W

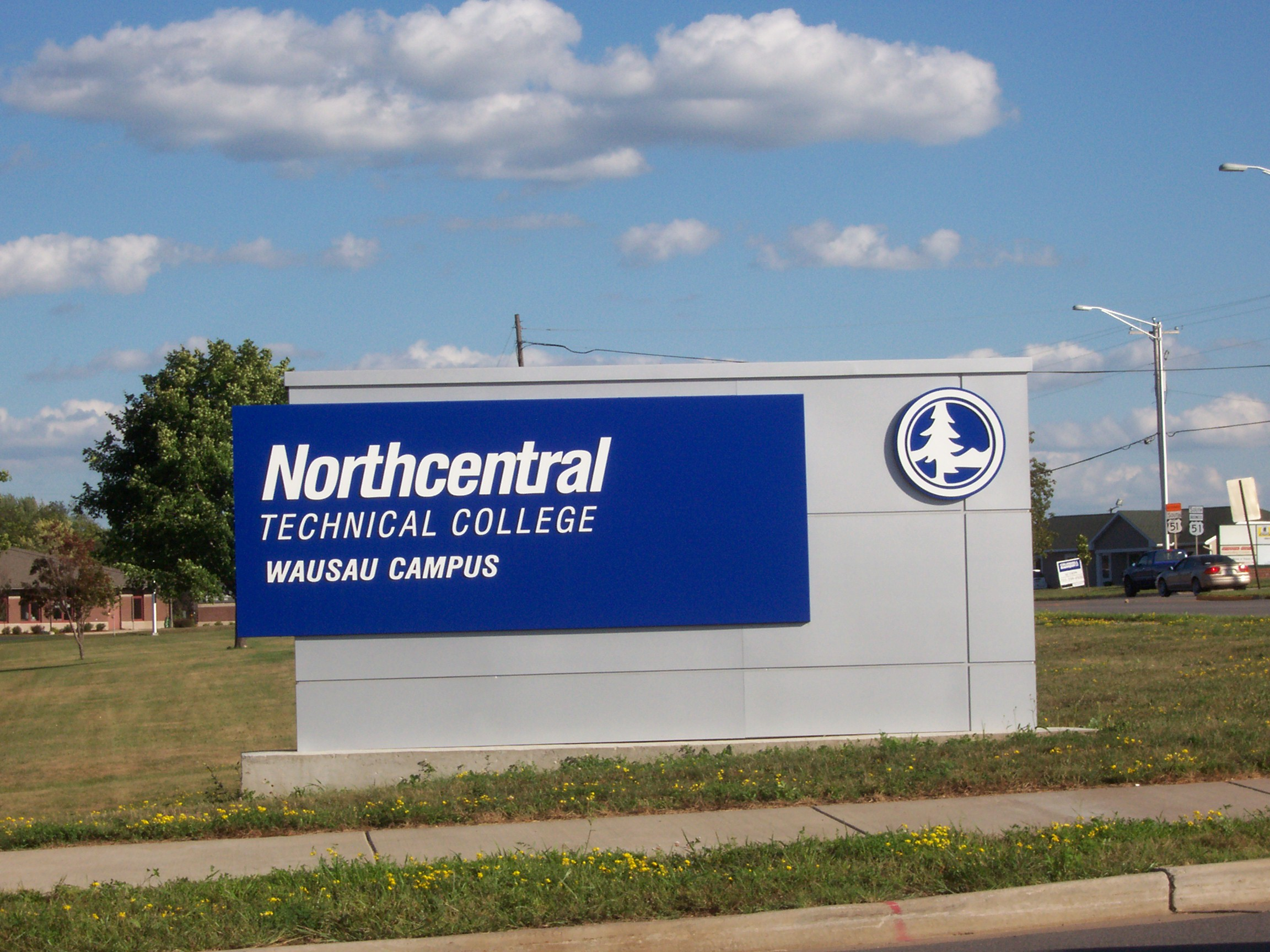
- Motto: Real life. Real learning.
- Type: State Technical College
- Established: 1912
- Budget: $43.9M (2009-2010)
- President: Dr. Jeannie Worden
- Faculty: Approximately 150 FT
- Students: 2022(FT), 3098(PT) as of 4-18-11
- Location: Wausau, Wisconsin, United States
- Campus: Urban
- Colors: Blue,Silver
- Nickname: Timberwolves
- Website: www.ntc.edu

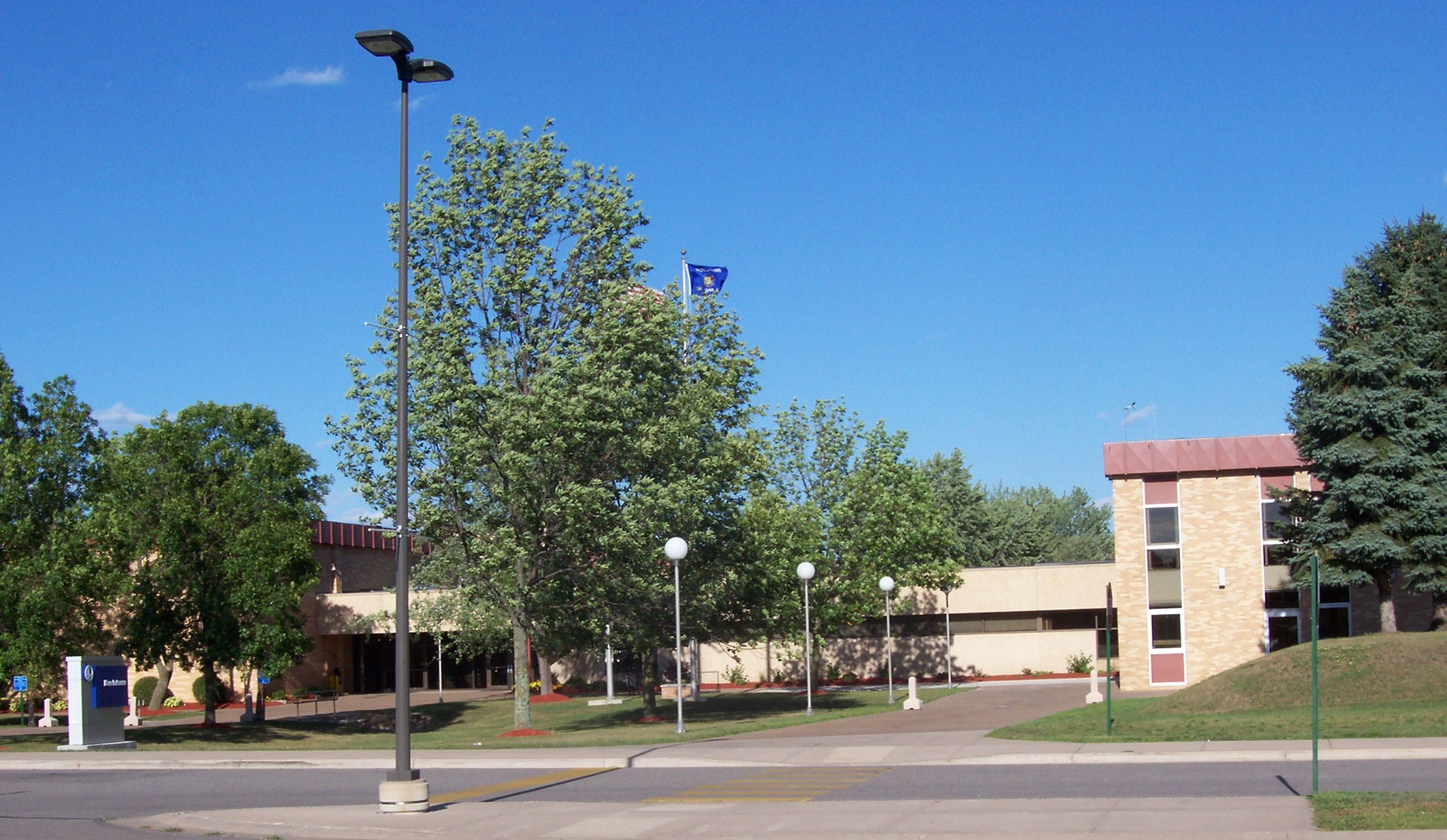
Main entrance at Wausau location

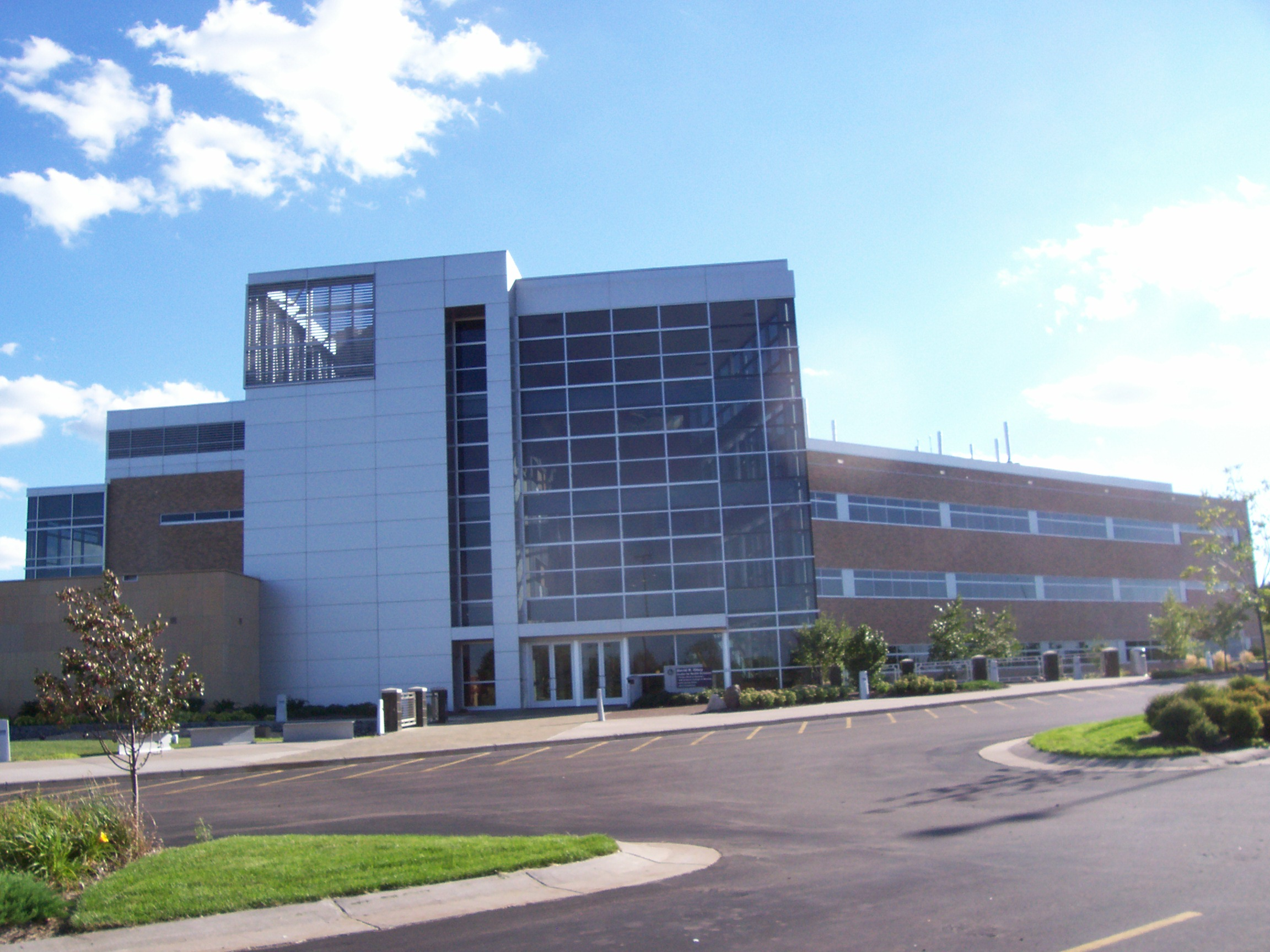
David Obey Center for Health Sciences in Wausau

Northcentral Technical College (NTC) is a public community college in Wausau, Wisconsin. It is a member of the Wisconsin Technical College System. The district of the college includes all of, or portions of, Marathon, Lincoln, Taylor, Price, Langlade, Menominee, Clark, Portage, Shawano and Waupaca counties. The main campus is located in Wausau. There are regional centers in Antigo, Medford, Merrill, Phillips, Spencer and Wittenberg.

== Accreditation ==
Northcentral Technical College is accredited by the Higher Learning Commission of the North Central Association (NCA). Several programs are accredited by other accreditation bodies.

== History ==
The college began as Wausau Industrial School in 1912. It was renamed Wausau Vocational School in 1936, Wausau Technical Institute in 1961, North Central Technical Institute (NCTI) in 1967. It began occupying its new facility in 1969. It was renamed Northcentral Technical College in 1988.

== Academics ==
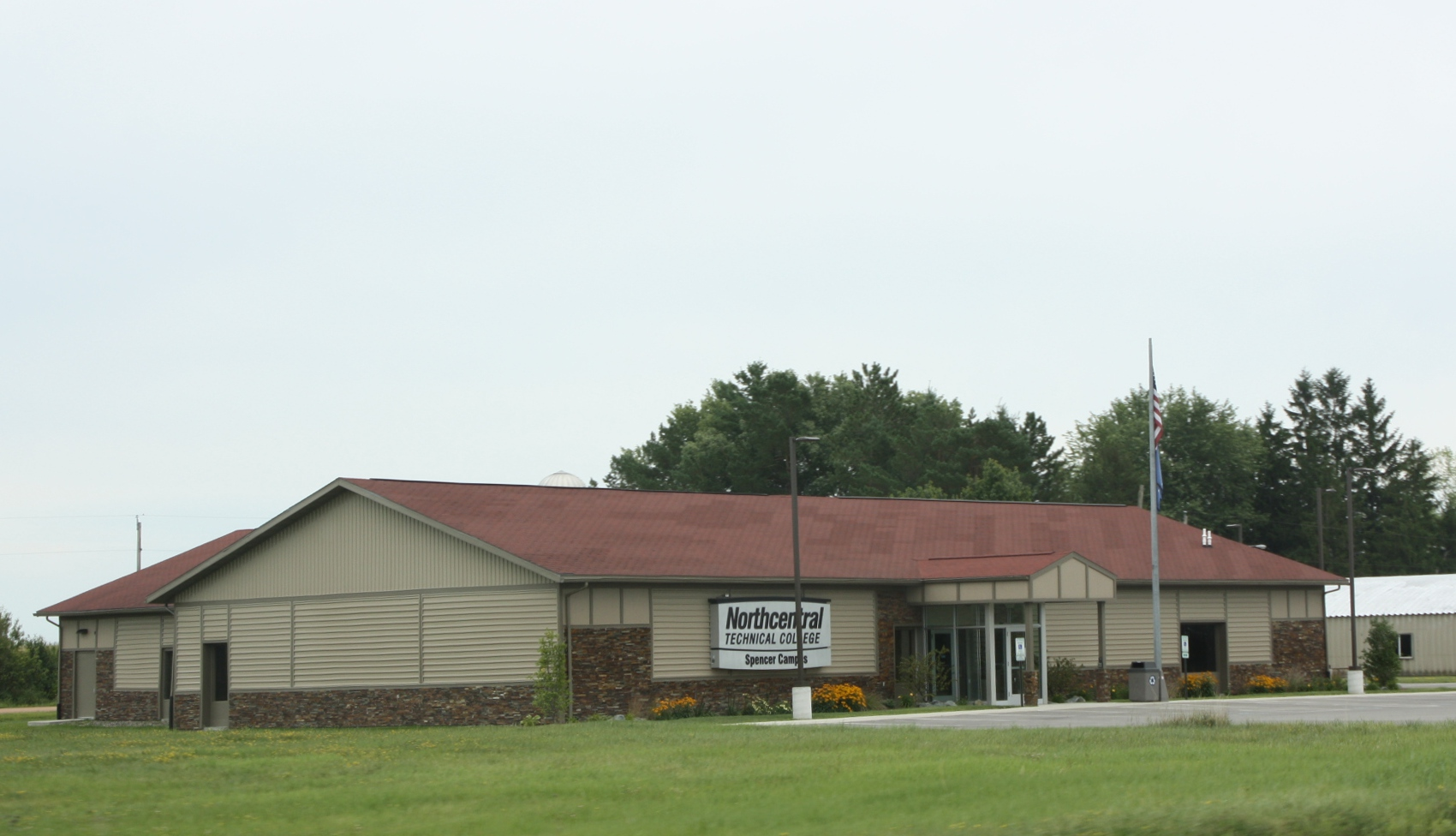
Regional center in Spencer

NTC offers associate degrees, technical diplomas, and over 100 certificate programs in agriculture, business, community services, general studies, health, public safety and technical and trades.

== Notable alumni ==
- Russ Decker, politician
