= University of Wisconsin–Milwaukee at Washington County =

College in West Bend, Wisconsin, U.S., 1968–2024

Coordinates: 43°25′07″N 88°12′45″W

- Type: State university
- Active: 1968–June 2024
- Location: West Bend, Wisconsin, United States
- Campus: Urban
- Nickname: Wildcats
- Website: https://uwm.edu/washington

The University of Wisconsin–Milwaukee at Washington County was a campus of the College of General Studies, University of Wisconsin-Milwaukee, and is located in West Bend, Wisconsin, United States. In 2018, the college became a regional campus of the University of Wisconsin-Milwaukee.

The campus closed on June 30, 2024, as part of a larger cut in regional campuses throughout the University of Wisconsin System.

== History ==
The founding of a University of Wisconsin System campus in Washington County began with the purchase of land owned by local farmer Carl Pick and UW Regent approval of the site on November 12, 1965. Groundbreaking for the new campus took place on July 12, 1967 and classes first started in September, 1968. The campus has consistently expanded from 1980 to 2009 because of increased enrollment and University program offerings. On February 18, 2009 a dedication was held for the approximately 30,000 square feet (2,800 m^{2}) of space that was added, including a new Learning Center, state of the art lecture halls and classrooms, engineering labs, faculty offices, and a commons area where students can relax or study.

The 2024 campus administrator was Dr. Alan Paul Price. The campus was part of the College of General Studies at the University of Wisconsin-Milwaukee and Dr. Simon J. Bronner was its dean.

== Closure ==
Also on October 17, 2023, it was announced that University of Wisconsin–Milwaukee at Washington County would also close at the end of June 2024. The UWM Washington County campus was called "not sustainable" by its chancellor Mark Mone in the announcement of the campus closure. Its final enrollment was 285 students.

== Academics ==
UWM at Washington County, through collaborative arrangements with four-year campuses, offered bachelor's degree programs in addition to a guaranteed transfer to any University of Wisconsin System four-year university.
