= University of Wisconsin–Green Bay, Manitowoc Campus =

Two-year college in Manitowoc, Wisconsin, U.S.

UW–Green Bay, Manitowoc Campus
- Main entrance
- Type: Public, State University
- Established: 1933
- Parent institution: University of Wisconsin–Green Bay
- Faculty: 42
- Students: 468 (Fall 2024)
- Location: Manitowoc, Wisconsin, U.S.
- Campus: Suburban, 40 acres (16.2 ha)
- Colors: Blue and white
- Mascot: Blue Devil
- Website: uwgb.edu/manitowoc

The University of Wisconsin–Green Bay, Manitowoc Campus or UW–Green Bay, Manitowoc Campus is a two-year campus of the University of Wisconsin System located in Manitowoc, Wisconsin. It is part of the University of Wisconsin–Green Bay.

== History ==
The University of Wisconsin System has had a presence in Manitowoc since 1933, when 26 students enrolled in a UW English class offered at the Vocational School located downtown on Clark Street. In July 2018 the UW System was restructured so that UW–Manitowoc became a UW–Green Bay campus. In August 2018 the name was officially changed to University of Wisconsin–Green Bay, Manitowoc Campus or UW–Green Bay, Manitowoc Campus.

== Academics ==
The UW–Green Bay, Manitowoc Campus runs on the semester system. The school offers an Associate of Arts and Science Degree (60 credits), leading towards a bachelor's degree at many four-year colleges.

Student enrollment peaked at 664 students in Fall 2011. As of the Fall 2023 semester, there were 404 total students, with 300 students attending full-time. UW–Green Bay, Manitowoc Campus has about 45 faculty and instructional staff, as well as 30 administrative and support staff.

The UW–Green Bay, Manitowoc Campus is accredited by the North Central Association of Colleges and Schools.

== Campus ==
The 40-acre (16.2 ha) campus is located on the south side of the city near Silver Creek Park and on the shore of Lake Michigan. It was opened in 1962. There were two major additions to the campus: Hillside Hall (renamed from West Hall) in 1986, and Lakeside Hall in 2001. The original building is now named Founders Hall.

The music and theater departments are located in Lakeside Hall, which also has a 350-seat theater and orchestra pit. It is used for plays, concerts, and lectures. The main academic lecture hall is located in Hillside Hall.

=== Transportation ===
The university campus is accessible via Maritime Metro Transit. Route 4 provides bus service from campus to downtown Manitowoc.

== Sports ==
The UW–Green Bay, Manitowoc Campus Blue Devils compete in the East Division of the Wisconsin Collegiate Conference. The program offers intercollegiate athletic opportunities in co-ed golf, as well as men's and women's basketball, tennis, and volleyball.
