= University of Wisconsin–Whitewater at Rock County =

Public college in Janesville, Wisconsin, U.S.

Coordinates: 42°38′53″N 89°03′22″W

- Type: Public, state university
- Faculty: 79
- Students: 897
- Location: Janesville, Wisconsin, U.S.
- Campus: Suburban, 50 acres (20.2 ha)
- Colors: Purple and White
- Nickname: Rattlers
- Sporting affiliations: NJCAA – Region 13
- Website: uww.edu/rock

The University of Wisconsin–Whitewater at Rock County (UW–Rock County or U Rock) is a branch campus of the University of Wisconsin–Whitewater in Janesville, Wisconsin. The campus enrolls approximately 1,000 students pursuing an Associate of Arts and Sciences. Rock County campus students are welcome to live in residence halls on the Whitewater campus, and a free shuttle runs between the two campuses.

== History ==
Newspaper articles, dating back from 1963, mention proposals of a new university in the Rock County area. The proposal to build the campus was dated in 1965, with the estimated cost at $1,050,000. The groundbreaking ceremony took place on October 6, 1965. The campus opened in 1966 and was called the University of Wisconsin–Rock County Center. The college intended to provide affordable college education to all types of students (traditional and non-traditional) and to prepare them to transfer to a four-year university.

After the restructuring of the University of Wisconsin System in 2018, University of Wisconsin–Rock County began operating as a branch campus of the University of Wisconsin–Whitewater and was renamed University of Wisconsin–Whitewater at Rock County.

== Academics ==
Enrollment was 1,220 in fall 2013, and the student/teacher ratio was 18:1. Currently, enrollment is at 897 students with 79 academic staff.

The school offers a general education associate degree. After beginning studies at UW–Rock County, students transfer to other UW System institutions as well as to colleges and universities throughout the country to complete their bachelor's degrees.

The campus hosts the Rock County Engineering Program, a partnership with UW–Platteville offering a Bachelor of Science degree in engineering. The program was established to support the industrial base of Rock County.

The school's athletic teams, known as the Rattlers, participate in three sports: co-ed soccer, men's and women's basketball, and volleyball.

UW–Whitewater at Rock County has an art department that offers classes in drawing, oil painting, and design, a theater area that produces plays and musicals, and a music department that offers classes in music theory, aural skills, and ensemble offerings including two separate choirs, a chamber orchestra, a jazz band, and a concert band.
