= University of Wisconsin (disambiguation) =

University of Wisconsin may refer to:

- The University of Wisconsin System, the public state university system of Wisconsin, and its components:
  - Research Universities granting doctorates:
    - University of Wisconsin–Madison, the largest and oldest university in this system, which is abbreviated UW and known as the flagship campus of the system
    - University of Wisconsin–Milwaukee, the only other research university in the system, abbreviated UWM or occasionally UW–M
  - Four-year comprehensive universities primarily granting baccalaureates:
    - University of Wisconsin–Eau Claire
    - University of Wisconsin–Green Bay
    - University of Wisconsin–La Crosse
    - University of Wisconsin–Oshkosh
    - University of Wisconsin–Parkside
    - University of Wisconsin–Platteville
    - University of Wisconsin–River Falls
    - University of Wisconsin–Stevens Point
    - University of Wisconsin–Stout
    - University of Wisconsin–Superior
    - University of Wisconsin–Whitewater
  - University of Wisconsin Colleges, formerly the UW Centers, primarily granting two-year degrees, account for one unit of the system.
    - University of Wisconsin–Baraboo/Sauk County
    - University of Wisconsin–Barron County
    - University of Wisconsin–Fond du Lac
    - University of Wisconsin–Fox Valley
    - University of Wisconsin–Manitowoc
    - University of Wisconsin–Marathon County
    - University of Wisconsin–Marinette
    - University of Wisconsin–Marshfield/Wood County
    - University of Wisconsin–Richland
    - University of Wisconsin–Rock County
    - University of Wisconsin–Sheboygan
    - University of Wisconsin–Washington County
    - University of Wisconsin–Waukesha
    - University of Wisconsin Colleges Online
  - University of Wisconsin Extension
- The University of Wisconsin (1956–1971), a former institution formed by the merger of four campuses (Madison, Milwaukee, Green Bay, Parkside)
- The Wisconsin State Universities, which merged with the above to form the University of Wisconsin System

== See also ==
=== Related to the University of Wisconsin ===
- University of Wisconsin Hospital and Clinics
- University of Wisconsin Credit Union
- University of Wisconsin–Milwaukee Golda Meir Library
- History of the University of Wisconsin–Milwaukee
- University of Wisconsin-Milwaukee Engelmann Field
- University of Wisconsin-Milwaukee J. Martin Klotsche Center
- University of Wisconsin–Milwaukee Panthers

=== Not related to the University of Wisconsin ===
- Wisconsin Technical College System
- Category:Universities and colleges in Wisconsin
- Concordia University Wisconsin
- Wisconsin International University College, a school in Ghana
- Medical College of Wisconsin
