= Wisconsin State College of Milwaukee =

American public college (1885–1956)

Coordinates: 43°04′34″N 87°52′43″W

- Former names: Wisconsin State Normal School (1885–1927); Wisconsin State Teachers College-Milwaukee (1927–1951)
- Type: Public
- Active: 1885–1956
- Location: Milwaukee, Wisconsin, United States
- Colors: Green and White
- Mascot: Green Gulls

Wisconsin State College of Milwaukee was a predecessor institution of the University of Wisconsin–Milwaukee. Founded in 1885 as Wisconsin State Normal School, it became Wisconsin State Teachers College-Milwaukee in 1927, and Wisconsin State College of Milwaukee in 1951. Originally at a downtown site, the Normal School subsequently moved to the Lakeside campus. In 1956, it merged with the University of Wisconsin–Extension's Milwaukee branch, forming the University of Wisconsin–Milwaukee.

== History ==
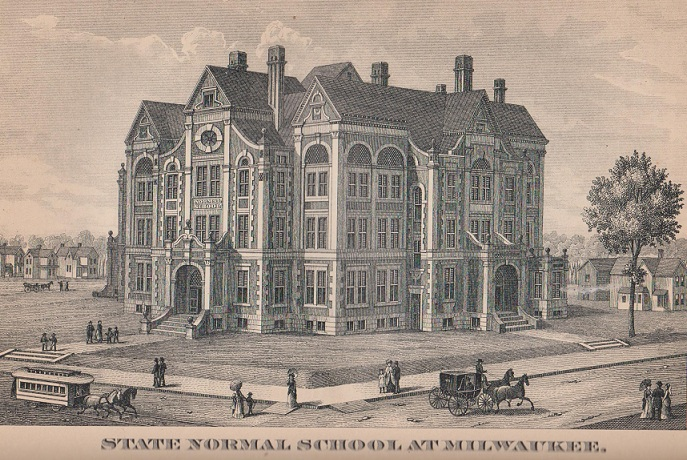
An illustration of the State Normal School, from the 1885 edition of the Wisconsin Blue Book.

Wisconsin State Normal School in Milwaukee, Wisconsin opened September 14, 1885. The school opened with six teachers and 46 students. Its principal was S. Anna Gordon. It was housed in a specially constructed building on the corner of 18th and Wells Streets, provided by the city at the cost of $53,000. In 1892, a addition was added to the building, doubling the school's capacity.

The Normal School's student enrollment continued to grow. In 1905 and 1907, the Wisconsin State Legislature made appropriations that enabled the school to purchase twelve acres of land and construct a larger, modern building. In 1909, the school moved to the new Kenwood campus, on which had been erected a single building which would later be named Mitchell Hall. The north wing opened three years later.

Wisconsin State Normal School absorbed the Milwaukee School of Fine and Applied Arts, previously operated by the Milwaukee Arts Students' League, and the Wisconsin School of Fine and Applied Arts in 1911. The school began to offer a wider curriculum and non-teacher options, including agriculture, home economics, commerce, journalism, pre-medical and pre-law. The broadened curriculum proved to be popular and accounted for over one-third of the enrollment.

However, the new curriculum was attacked by the Carnegie Endowment for the Advancement of Teachers, arguing that normal schools should not stray from their role as trainers of teachers. In 1923, the State Normal School Regents voted to discontinue college courses in an effort to refocus on the instruction of teachers. Reversing that decision, the State Normal School Regents authorized the school to offer education-related four-year degrees in early 1927. This officially made the normal school and college.

In 1927, the Wisconsin State Normal School changed its name to the Wisconsin State Teachers' College-Milwaukee. Known for its innovative and experimental programs in teacher education, the Wisconsin State Teacher's College was a national prominence at that time and was considered one of the top teacher training colleges in the nation by the 1940s.

In 1951, when the Wisconsin State Legislature empowered all state colleges to offer liberal arts programs, Wisconsin State Teachers College-Milwaukee changed its name to Wisconsin State College of Milwaukee. The college opened a new library and laboratory. It also added a campus elementary school.

In 1955, the legislature voted to merge Wisconsin State Teachers College-Milwaukee with the University of Wisconsin–Extension's Milwaukee branch. The merger took place 1956, forming the University of Wisconsin–Milwaukee.

== Academics ==
At the beginning, it was a normal school: a teacher preparation school. After the turn of the 20th century, the school introduced several new areas of study, including liberal arts and music education. With the acquisition of the Wisconsin School of Fine and Applied Arts in 1911, the school taught classes for both artists and art teachers. This was an academic department that offered classes in art history, art needlework, basketry, book binding, commercial design, drawing, interior design, jewelry, lettering, metal work, mural decoration, outdoor landscape, painting, pottery, silver smithing, and wood carving.

The normal school also provided training for a kindergarten diploma, which authorized recipients to teach kindergarten and the first three grades of elementary school.

However, by 1935, the normal school had become a college, and the Milwaukee State Teachers College dropped academic programs that were less than four years. In 1937, it began offering Bachelor's of Science degrees in education, expanding to liberal arts degrees in 1951. It awarded its first Master's of Education in 1945.

== Student life ==
The students published The Echo yearbook and Cheshire, a literary review. It had chapters of several fraternities, including the national fraternities Beta Phi Theta starting in 1917 and Phi Sigma Epsilon starting in 1949, the national service fraternity Alpha Phi Omega and the local fraternities Alpha Kappa Tau, Delta Sigma Kappa, and Omicron Omicron Omicron. There was a chapter of the national sorority Alpha Sigma Tau from 1909 to 1913 and numerous local sororities, including Alpha Beta Gamma, Alpha Gamma Lambda, Alpha Delta Sigma, Alpha Phi Lambda, Chi Sigma Lambda, Kappa Lambda Iota, Lambda Phi Chi, Mu Beta Sigma, Sigma Omicron Delta, Upsilon Lambda Sigma, Pi Delta Alpha, Pi Theta Alpha, Sigma Lambda Phi, Sigma Omicron Phi, Sigma Phi Tau, and Theta Lambda Phi .

The Normal School included Pi Kappa Sigma a national pedagogical sorority from 1907 to 1911. The college also had a chapter of Lambda Iota Tau, an national honor society for literature.

== Athletics ==
Wisconsin State College of Milwaukee's colors were green and white. Its mascot was the Green Gulls. The college had a football team in the Wisconsin Intercollegiate Athletic Conference. In 1940, it had an undefeated season under head coach Guy Penwell, finishing the year 16–0 with its third conference championship.

The school competed in basketball as the Milwaukee Normals from 1896 to 1927, and as the Milwaukee State Green Gulls from 1927 to 1956.

== Notable people ==
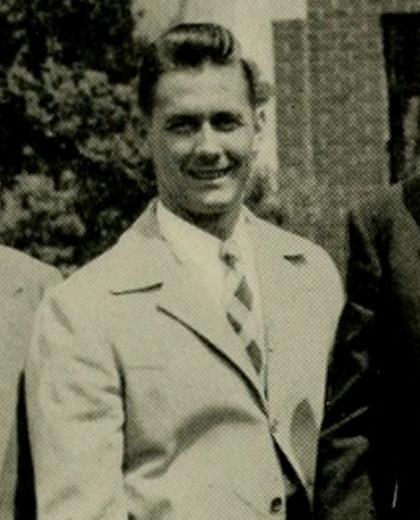
Warren Giese

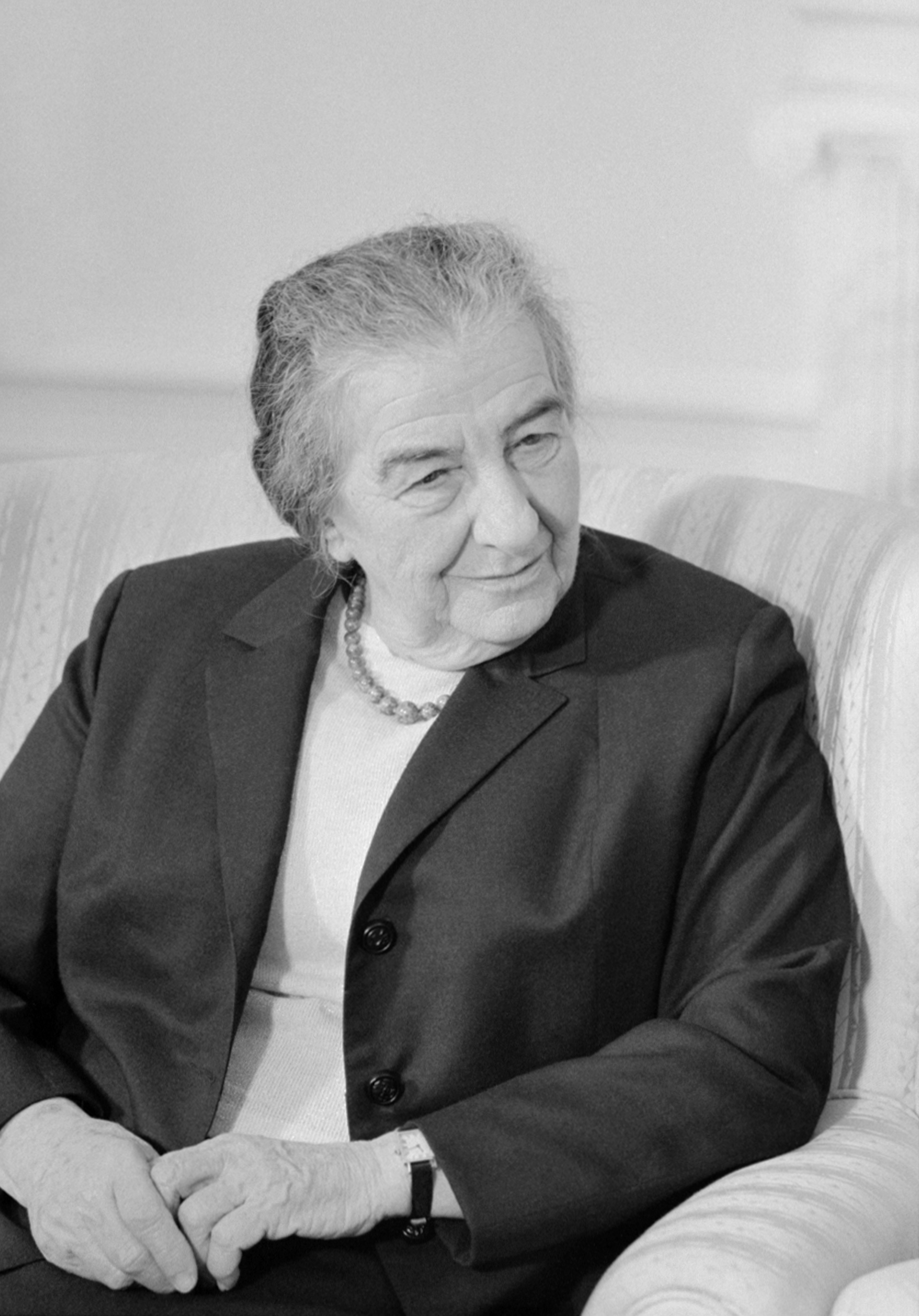
Golda Meir

=== Alumni ===
- Ruth Asawa, sculptor
- John C. Becher (1938, B.S.), stage and television actor
- Allen Busby, Wisconsin State Assembly and Wisconsin State Senate
- Timothy T. Cronin, United States Attorney for the Eastern District of Wisconsin
- Frank A. Dudley, New York State Assembly
- Margaret R. Fox, chief of the Office of Computer Information of the National Bureau of Standards
- Dorothy Fuldheim, journalist and news anchor, "First Lady of Television News"
- Paul C. Gartzke, former presiding judge of the Wisconsin Court of Appeals
- Warren Giese, South Carolina Senate and head football coach for the South Carolina Gamecocks
- Herschel Burke Gilbert, composer of film and television theme songs
- Ruth Grotenrath, painter and printmaker
- Marguerite Henry, writer of children's books
- Clara Stanton Jones, the first African American president of the American Library Association
- John Kaney, Wisconsin State Assembly
- Ken Kranz, professional football player
- Schomer Lichtner, painter, printmaker, and art teacher
- Golda Meir, former Prime Minister of Israel
- Dorothy Meredith, artist and educator
- Paul Meyers, professional football player
- Clem Neacy, professional football player
- Mark Ryan, Wisconsin State Assembly
- Theodore Saloutos (1933, BA), history professor at the University of California, Los Angeles
- Virginia Satir (1936, BA Education), author and psychotherapist
- Douglas C. Steltz, Wisconsin State Assembly
- Lutie Stearns, author, speaker, and librarian with the Milwaukee Public Library
- George H. Sutton, professional billiard player
- Whitey Wolter, professional football player

=== Faculty and staff ===
- William Stebbins Barnard, entomologist and biologist
- Herbert Eugene Bolton, historian
- Lorenzo D. Harvey, president 1892–1898
- J. Martin Klotsche, president 1946–1956
- Guy Penwell, men's basketball coach, 1930–1942 and 1946–1952
- Russ Rebholz, head basketball coach, 1952–1956
- W Otto Miessner, composer and music educator
- S. Anna Gordon, first principal of the State Normal School of Wisconsin.

== See also ==
- History of the University of Wisconsin–Milwaukee
- List of colleges and universities in Wisconsin
- University of Wisconsin System
