= List of Milwaukee Panthers men's basketball head coaches =

The following is a list of Milwaukee Panthers men's basketball head coaches. There have been 23 head coaches of the Panthers in their 131-season history.

Milwaukee's current head coach is Bart Lundy. He was hired as the Panthers' head coach in March 2022, replacing Pat Baldwin, who was fired after the 2021–22 season.

No.	Tenure	Coach	Years	Record	Pct.
–	1896–1908	No coach	12	79–46	.632
1	1908–1910	Charles Davies	2	11–19	.367
2	1910–1914	Emmett Angeli	4	51–17	.750
3	1914–1917; 1920–1926	Barney Anderson	9	59–76–1	.438
4	1917–1918	Paul Stothart	1	1–9	.100
5	1918–1920	George Downer	2	15–12	.556
6	1926–1930	Milton Murray	4	17–40	.298
7	1930–1942; 1946–1952	Guy Penwell	18	186–145	.562
8	1942–1946	John Tierney	4	34–25	.576
9	1952–1963	Russ Rebholz	11	123–105	.539
10	1963–1970	Ray Krzoska	7	86–87	.497
11	1970–1973	Charlie Parsley	3	46–29	.613
12	1973–1975	Bill Klucas	2	22–30	.423
13	1975–1980	Bob Gottlieb	5	62–70	.470
14	1980–1983	Bob Voight	3	51–25	.671
15	1983–1987	Ray Swetalla	4	33–74	.308
16	1987–1995	Steve Antrim	8	124–100	.554
17	1995–1999	Ric Cobb	4	28–81	.257
18	1999–2001	Bo Ryan	2	30–27	.526
19	2001–2005	Bruce Pearl	4	86–38	.694
20	2005–2016	Rob Jeter	11	184–170	.520
21	2016–2017	LaVall Jordan	1	11–24	.314
22	2017–2022	Pat Baldwin	5	57–92	.383
23	2022–present	Bart Lundy	4	70–47	.598
Totals		23 coaches	131 seasons	1,466–1,388–1	.514
Records updated through end of 2024–25 season Source
