= Penwell =

Penwell may refer to:

- Penwell, New Jersey
- Penwell, Texas

== See also ==
- Bonnell (microarchitecture)#Penwell, microprocessor architecture
- Guy Penwell, basketball coach
- PennWell, an American publishing company
- Pennewill, a surname
