= Sarah Gordon =

Sarah Gordon may refer to:

- Sarah Gordon (computer scientist) (fl. 1980s–1990s), American computer security researcher
- Sarah Gordon (equestrian) (1963–2016), Irish equestrian
- Sarah Barringer Gordon (born 1955), American professor of law and history
- S. Anna Gordon (1832–unknown), physician and author of Camping in Colorado with Suggestions to Gold-Seekers, Tourists and Invalids
- Sarah Gordon (One Life to Live), a character on the soap opera One Life to Live
- Sarah Essen Gordon, a fictional character in DC Comics

== See also ==
- Sarah Gorden (born 1992), American soccer player
