= Kevin P. Reilly =

University president (born 1949)

Kevin P. Reilly (born December 22, 1949, in New York City) served as the sixth president of the University of Wisconsin System from September 1, 2004, to December 31, 2013. Reilly was chancellor of UW-Extension, prior to the Board of Regents appointment on July 29, 2004, as the sixth president of the UW System. He left office on December 31, 2013. He will be teaching higher education and Irish studies at University of Wisconsin–Madison.

The UW System includes two doctoral universities, UW–Madison and UW–Milwaukee, as well as 11 comprehensive universities, 13 freshman-sophomore UW Colleges, and statewide UW–Extension.

Reilly served as Chancellor of UW–Extension from July 2000 through August 2004. His responsibilities included leading programs in continuing education, Cooperative Extension, distance education, small business development, Wisconsin Public Radio, and Wisconsin Public Television. He served as Provost and Vice Chancellor of Extension from 1996 to 2000.

A native of New York City, Reilly came to Wisconsin from the State University of New York System, where he was Associate Provost for Academic Programs and then Secretary of the University.

Reilly earned his B.A. at the University of Notre Dame, and his M.A. and Ph.D in English (with a focus on Irish literature and culture) at the University of Minnesota.

Preceded by Katharine Culbert Lyall	President of the University of Wisconsin System; 2004-2013	Succeeded by Richard J. Telfer (interim)
