= University of Wisconsin Sustainable Management =

Advertorial summary of a degree on offer

- Type: Public
- Established: September 2009
- Dean: David Schejbal
- Location: Wisconsin, U.S.
- Campus: online
- Website: sustain.wisconsin.edu

The Bachelor of Science in Sustainable Management is an online interdisciplinary sustainable management bachelor's degree program. A joint effort between the University of Wisconsin–Extension and four of the University of Wisconsin campuses, UW–Parkside, UW–River Falls, UW–Stout, and UW–Superior, the program began enrolling students for the fall 2009 semester.

== About ==
The Bachelor of Science in Sustainable Management is a fully accredited bachelor's degree completion program. The program was approved by the University of Wisconsin Board of Regents, and is accredited by the North Central Association of Colleges and Schools. The curriculum was developed in cooperation with companies that are leading the way in sustainability, including Johnson Controls, Ford Motor Company, Eastman Kodak, Quad Graphics, FedEx, SC Johnson, Kohl's Department Stores, Veolia Environmental Services, and Modine Manufacturing. UW–Extension also worked with the Wisconsin Department of Natural Resources and other government agencies, along with faculty from the four UW campuses, to build the curriculum.

== Competencies ==
The program's goal is for students to gain an understanding of how business systems, natural systems, and social systems intersect.

The competencies for the Bachelor of Science in Sustainable Management degree were developed with help from corporate leaders interested in sustainability and the triple bottom line. To meet all intended learning outcomes of the program, students must demonstrate the following:

=== Technical Competencies ===
- Carbon trading and carbon credits
- Climate change and global warming implications on businesses and societies
- Water policy and water science
- Logistics and transportation of raw materials
- Supply chain
- The mechanics of energy generation, energy infrastructure, energy management, energy policy, and energy purchasing
- Sustainable marketing, communications, and public affairs with a focus on triple bottom line practices

=== General Competencies ===
- World geography
- Cultural understanding
- Political awareness
- Geopolitical dynamics
- Global gender issues
- Opportunity analysis

== Certificates ==
The program also offers two certificates. The 15-credit Sustainable Enterprise Management certificate is available through UW–Parkside, UW–Stout, and UW–Superior. The 12-credit Sustainable Management Science certificate is available through UW–Parkside, UW–River Falls, UW–Stout, and UW–Superior.
