= History of the University of Wisconsin–Milwaukee =

The history of the University of Wisconsin–Milwaukee dates back to 1885, when the Milwaukee State Normal School opened for classes at 18th and Wells in downtown Milwaukee.

In the fall of 1956, the University of Wisconsin–Milwaukee was created as a result of the merger of the Wisconsin State College of Milwaukee (formerly the Milwaukee State Normal School) and the University of Wisconsin's Milwaukee extension, a UW branch that had been offering graduate degrees in Milwaukee. The newly created university, consisting of the Wisconsin State College of Milwaukee campus and University of Wisconsin's Milwaukee Extension, was considered a part of the University of Wisconsin.

== Early history ==
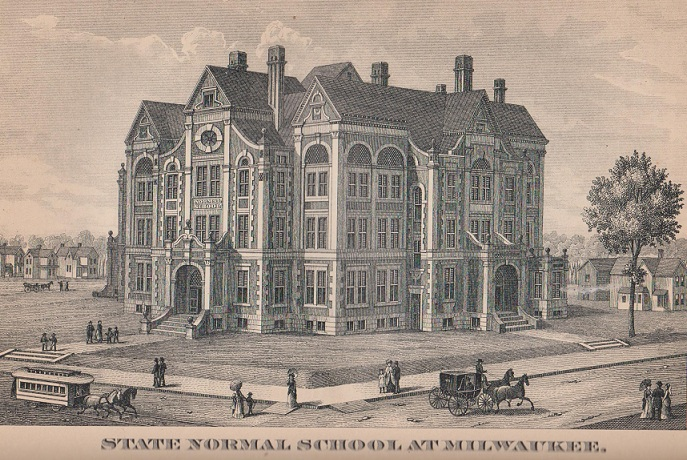
Illustration of the State Normal School at Milwaukee, published in the 1885 edition of the Wisconsin Blue Book.

In 1880, the Wisconsin Legislature passed a law requiring the Board of Regents of Normal Schools to establish a normal school in the Milwaukee area in order to meet the growing demand for higher education by the city's soaring population. As a result, the Milwaukee State Normal School opened for classes in 1885 at 18th and Wells Streets, with John J. Mapel as president. Over the next 42 years, the Milwaukee State Normal School saw 7 different presidents, the addition of music and liberal arts programs, and rapid growth from an initial enrollment of 46. In 1909, the school moved from downtown to its current location near the lakefront when a new building, now Mitchell Hall, was completed.

In 1922, the State Normal School Regents voted to discontinue college courses in an effort to refocus on the instruction of teachers. The Milwaukee State Normal School then began to offer education-related four-year degrees and in 1927, the school changed its name to the Wisconsin State Teachers College-Milwaukee, or "Milwaukee State" for short. It quickly dropped all non-four-year degree programs and offered its first Bachelor of Science degree program in 1937, in education. After World War II, the school added a graduate program in education. In 1946, J. Martin Klotsche became president of the college and remained head of the evolving institution until 1973. In 1951, when the Legislature empowered all state colleges to offer liberal arts programs, Wisconsin State Teachers College–Milwaukee changed its name to Wisconsin State College of Milwaukee, which became part of the University of Wisconsin five years later.

== Since 1956 ==
Pressed by the growing strong demand for a large comprehensive public university that offered graduate programs in Wisconsin's largest city, the Wisconsin state legislature passed a bill in 1955 to merge Wisconsin State College-Milwaukee and UW-Extension's Milwaukee center to form the University of Wisconsin-Milwaukee. The merged university first opened in 1956, consisting of the old WSCM campus near the lakefront and the University of Wisconsin extension in downtown Milwaukee. It was founded in the belief that "if metropolitan Milwaukee was to be great, it would need a great urban public university". The first commencement of the new University of Wisconsin–Milwaukee was held on June 16, 1957. On June 13, 1958, Milwaukee's Socialist mayor Frank P. Zeidler was the first person to receive an honorary doctorate from the university. Enrollment grew from 6,195 in 1956 to 9,354 in 1962, and new academic programs, colleges and schools were created to meet student demands.

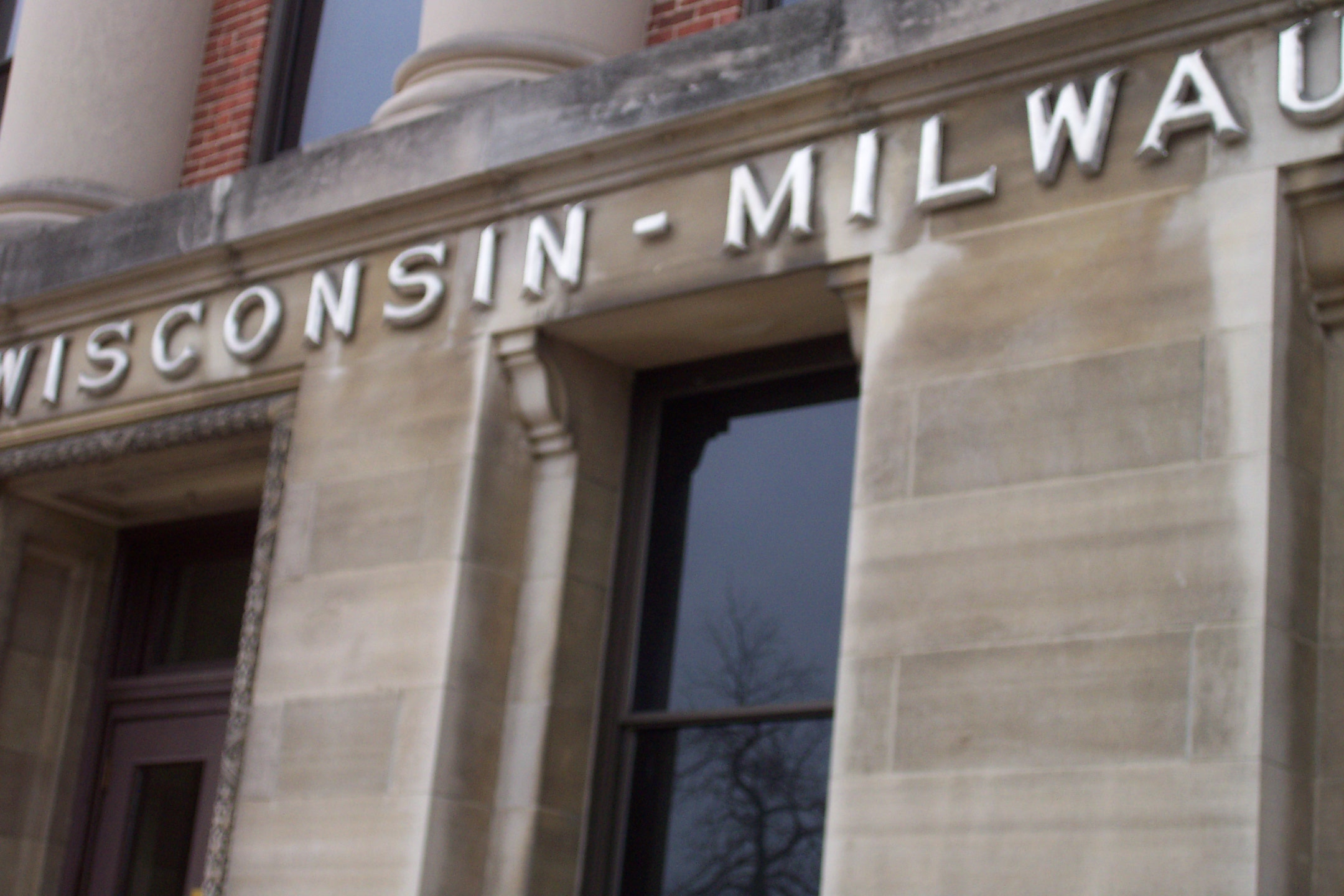
Mitchell Hall

In 1964, the campus of the neighboring private women's institution, Milwaukee-Downer College, was purchased by the state to expand the UWM campus; Milwaukee-Downer College had previously merged with Lawrence College to form the present Lawrence University in Appleton, Wisconsin. The university had already purchased the former campuses and buildings of the former Milwaukee-Downer Seminary and Milwaukee University School along Hartford Avenue.

In 1971, the University of Wisconsin System was created by the legislature, and UWM became a legally distinct entity from the University of Wisconsin, of which it had until that point been a part.

In the 50 years since the Milwaukee campus was added to the UW System, UWM has expanded to 12 schools and colleges that offer 84 undergraduate programs, 48 graduate programs, and 20 doctoral degrees, with a university-wide focus on academic research, teaching, and community service. In 1988, the UW System designated eight Centers of Excellence at UWM. The university is designated a "Comprehensive doctoral (no medical/veterinary)" institution in the Carnegie Classification of Institutions of Higher Education.

In 2005, UW–Milwaukee surpassed UW–Madison in the number of Wisconsin resident undergraduate students and resident graduate students. In 2008 and 2009, the school saw the establishments of the School of Public Health and the School of Freshwater Sciences. In 2010, UW-Milwaukee purchased its neighboring Columbia St. Mary's Hospital complex. In the early 2011, UW-Milwaukee closed the land purchase for its Innovation Park in Wauwatosa.

== Institutional milestones ==
- 1956 – Wisconsin State College–Milwaukee merged with University of Wisconsin's Milwaukee Extension, a UW branch had been offering graduate degrees in Milwaukee, to form the new University of Wisconsin–Milwaukee
- 1961 – The 8.6-acre (35,000 m^{2}) Milwaukee-Downer Seminary site, including 3 buildings, was purchased
- 1963 – UW–Milwaukee offered its first PhD degree in Mathematics
- 1964 – UW–Milwaukee purchased the Milwaukee-Downer College campus
- 1965 – UW–Milwaukee purchased the 6.3-acre (25,000 m^{2}) Milwaukee University School campus
- 1970 – Three residence towers, collectively called Sandburg Halls, opened for student housing
- 1971 – University of Wisconsin System created; UWM becomes distinct entity, no longer a part of the University of Wisconsin
- 1974 – Establishment of UWM Foundation
- 1988 – UW System designated eight Centers of Excellence at UW–Milwaukee
- 1994 – UW–Milwaukee was designated as a Research II University (now a Doctoral/Research University-Extensive) by the Carnegie Foundation.
- 2000 – UW–Milwaukee was named among top 102 public doctoral research universities in nation
- 2001 – Wisconsin's Governor announced honors academy at UW–Milwaukee
- 2007 – $125 million was raised during the $100 million Campaign for UW–Milwaukee
- 2008 – School of Public Health was established
- 2009 – School of Freshwater Sciences was established
- 2010 – UW-Milwaukee purchased its neighboring Columbia St. Mary's Hospital complex
- 2011 – UW-Milwaukee closed the land purchase for its Innovation Park in Wauwatosa
- 2016 – UW-Milwaukee elevated to the elite status of R-1 doctoral research university by the Carnegie Classification of Institutions of Higher Education.
