= Henry P. Melnikow =

Russian economic consultant

Henry P. Melnikow (August 6, 1892 – May 8, 1963) was an economic consultant to unions involved in labor, and represented numerous labor unions in finding compromises between unions and workers. He was a professor at the University of California, where he instructed extension courses for workers in industry. He was the director of the National Labor Bureau and dedicated close to fifty years of his life to the service of organized labor in California and protecting and promoting the rights of workers. In his later life he gave speeches at many UC schools supporting workers rights.

== Background ==
Henry P. Melnikow was born in 1892 in Kyiv, Russian Empire, where his father was a shopkeeper. In 1905 Henry moved to the United States with his family, where he was educated at Milwaukee Normal School. He attended the University of Wisconsin from 1912 to 1916 and then the University of California from 1921 to 1923. He became a teacher and a lawyer, and he resided in San Francisco for the majority of his life. He moved to Los Angeles in 1951. Melnikow spent most of his life fighting for workers' rights. He died May 8, 1963, at the age of 71.

== Significant contributions and legacy ==
Henry Melnikow was the director of the National Labor Bureau in San Francisco, where he fought and argued for labor rights in California. Some of his more significant contributions to the labor struggle included being involved in hearings on the proposed shipping code under the National Recovery Administration, and he was involved in and had influence over both the waterfront and general strikes He argued for the longshoremen and seamen before the National Longshoremen's Board from 1934 to 1935, and he submitted a case for the San Francisco Typographical University, arguing "that wages must increase if workers are to share in increase of productivity and industry resulting from improvement in Machinery and technique." He died while working on a way to solve a similar problem of quality of employment and job rearrangement that was caused by new automation and improvements to technology. Melnikow is remembered for his significant contribution to labor programs, and it was said in the UCLA Newsletter that his contributions to this area are "Historic importance to the field of labor relations." He is remembered for his enthusiasm and energy in helping improve the working conditions many working men and women throughout California and the United States.
