= Richard J. Telfer =

Richard J. Telfer is an American educator and interim President of the University of Wisconsin System in 2014.

Telfer received his bachelor's and master's degree from Central Michigan University and his doctorate from University of Wisconsin–Madison. He taught at University of Wisconsin–Whitewater and was chair of the Department of Curriculum and Instruction. Telfer was named chancellor of University of Wisconsin–Whitewater in 2008 and had served as provost and vice-chancellor and associate vice-chancellor. In October 2013, Telfer was named interim President of the University of Wisconsin System replacing Kevin P. Reilly effective January 1, 2014. Telfer served as interim President until mid-February 2014, when Raymond W. Cross was appointed the new President of the University of Wisconsin System.
