= Timothy T. Cronin =

American lawyer (1884–1955)

Timothy T. Cronin (June 27, 1884 – September 20, 1955) was the United States Attorney for the Eastern District of Wisconsin.

== Biography ==
Cronin was born to Timothy and Mary (Swanson) Cronin on June 27, 1884, in Chicago, Illinois. He later moved with his family to Oconomowoc, Wisconsin, and attended what later became the Wisconsin State College of Milwaukee and served as a high school principal in Mukwonago, Wisconsin, before his graduation from the University of Wisconsin Law School in 1914. During World War I, he served in the United States Army. A Roman Catholic, Cronin was a member of the Knights of Columbus and the Society of the Holy Name.

On November 9, 1916, Cronin married Maud F. Clohisy. They had two children. He died in Oconomowoc on September 20, 1955, due to complications from a myocardial infarction and a stroke.

== Legal and political career ==
Cronin opened a private practice in Oconomowoc after graduation from law school. He was U.S. Attorney from 1944 to 1955 before briefly returning to private practice until his death. Additionally, he was city attorney and a member of the school board of Oconomowoc.
