= Douglas C. Steltz =

American politician

Douglas C. Steltz (1920-2009) was a member of the Wisconsin State Assembly.

== Biography ==
Steltz was born on December 7, 1920, in West Milwaukee, Wisconsin. He attended Carroll University, the Wisconsin State College of Milwaukee and Marquette University Law School. During World War II, he served in the United States Naval Air Corps. Steltz died on March 17, 2009.

== Political career ==
Steltz was elected to the Assembly in 1944. He was a Democrat.
