= Dorothy Meredith =

American artist and educator

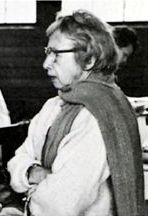
- Born: Dorothy Laverne Meredith; November 17, 1906; Milwaukee, Wisconsin, US
- Died: July 6, 1986 (aged 79); Washington County, Wisconsin, US
- Education: Layton School of Art, Wisconsin State College of Milwaukee, Cranbrook Academy of Art
- Known for: Fiber art

Dorothy Laverne Meredith (1906 – 1986) was an American artist and educator. She was known for her fiber art and abstract watercolor paintings.

== Early life and education ==
Dorothy Laverne Meredith was born in Milwaukee, Wisconsin on November 17, 1906, to Ida Simmerling and William Meredith. Her mother was also an artist. She attended Layton School of Art, and graduated in 1927, followed by Milwaukee State Teachers College (now known as Wisconsin State College of Milwaukee) and graduated in 1933 with a Bachelor of Education (B.Ed.). Additionally she got a Bachelor of Fine Arts (B.F.A.) degree from Cranbrook Academy of Art, where she studied with Maija Grotell. Meredith was active in the New Deal Federal Art Project in Wisconsin.

== Career ==
Her early teaching roles included the Winnebago Day School in Menasha, Lincoln School in Highland Park, and Peckham Junior High School in Milwaukee. For many years she was an art professor specializing in fiber arts and textiles at the University of Wisconsin, Milwaukee. In summers she taught at Ox Bow School of Art and Artists Residency in Saugatuck, Michigan. She later was a professor emeritus at University of Wisconsin, Milwaukee.

In 1965, Meredith visited 11 different countries, including India, Pakistan, Japan to enhance the courses she taught. She had travelled to rural locations to learn traditional textile techniques in each international region.

She was the secretary and president of the Wisconsin Designer Craftsmen's organization (now known as the Wisconsin Designer Crafts Council). Meredith was one of the founding members of the Wisconsin Watercolor Society. She also was a member of the Wisconsin Painters and Sculptors, and Midwest Designer Craftsmen.

In 1960, Meredith was elected a life fellow of the International Institute of Arts and Letters. In 1975, Meredith was an American Craft Council (ACC) fellow.

Meredith died on July 6, 1986, in Washington County, Wisconsin.
