= William Stebbins Barnard =

American biologist

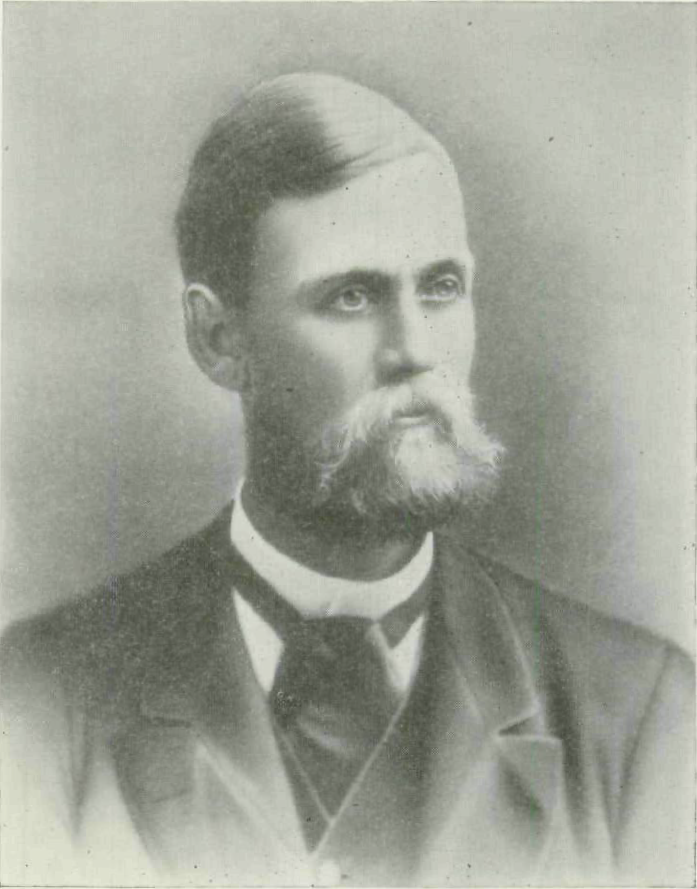
- Born: February 28, 1849; Canton
- Died: November 13, 1887 (aged 38); Des Moines
- Alma mater: University of Michigan; Cornell University; University of Jena
- Occupation: Biologist, naturalist
- Employer: Cornell University; Drake University; Illinois State University; Oskaloosa College; United States Department of Agriculture; Wisconsin State College of Milwaukee
- Children: William Nichols Barnard

William Stebbins Barnard (February 28, 1849 – November 13, 1887) was an American biologist.

Barnard was born on February 28, 1849 in Canton, Illinois. He studied at Canton High School, University of Michigan, Cornell University (B.S., 1871), University of Leipsic, and at the University of Jena (Ph. D., 1873). In 1870 he accompanied the scientific exploring expedition to Brazil as assistant geologist. On his return from Europe he lectured in 1874 at Cornell University, and during the summer at the school on Penikese Island. Since then he has lectured on natural history at Mississippi Agricultural College (1874–75); Illinois teachers' summer school (1875); Wisconsin State Normal School (1875); Oskaloosa College (1876–78); Cornell University (1878–1980); and Drake University (1886). During 1880–85 he was entomologist at the United States Department of Agriculture. Barnard made investigations in his specialties, and his papers appeared in scientific journals. His reports as entomologist were published by the government, and he contributed to the proceedings and transactions of the scientific societies of which he was a member. He made inventions of harvesters, both for corn and cotton, and also means and appliances for the destruction of injurious insects. He also devised the Harvard book-rack, improved paper-file holders, and similar articles. Barnard made several hundred plates and figures, some on stone, for the illustration of his papers.

Barnard died on November 13, 1887, in Des Moines, Iowa.
