= Katharine Lyall =

American academic administrator (born 1941)

Katharine Culbert Lyall
- Born: Katharine Culbert; April 26, 1941 (age 85); Lancaster, Pennsylvania, United States
- Known for: Appointment as the first woman president in the University of Wisconsin System

Katharine Culbert Lyall (born April 26, 1941) was the fifth president of the University of Wisconsin System, serving in that capacity from 1992 to 2004. The first woman ever to be appointed president of that university system, she had previously served as executive vice president of the system, and director of the Graduate Program in Public Policy at Johns Hopkins University.

Upon her retirement in 2004, colleagues praised her leadership and called her as "a very tough act to follow." Kenneth Shaw, the former president and chancellor of Syracuse University, who was also a former president of the University of Wisconsin System, described Lyall as "a scholar and outstanding administrator" who was known for being kind and patient.

== Early life ==
Born as Katharine Culbert in Lancaster, Pennsylvania on April 26, 1941, Katharine Lyall spent her early years in Pennsylvania. Her mother was a mathematics teacher. Awarded her Bachelor of Arts degree by Cornell University in 1963 and a Master's degree in Business Administration by New York University in 1965, Lyall subsequently received her Doctor of Philosophy in economics from Cornell in 1969.

== Career ==
Lyall taught economics courses at both Syracuse University in Syracuse, New York and Johns Hopkins University in Baltimore, Maryland, where she was appointed as the director of Hopkins' graduate program in public policy.

During the late 1970s, Lyall served as the deputy assistant secretary for policy development and research at the United States Department of Housing and Urban Development (HUD) under U.S. President Jimmy Carter. During her tenure, "a significant research program was undertaken by HUD’s Office of PD&R on the methods of urban impact analyses and on the broader impacts of a sizeable number of federal policies and programs," according to a 2010 analysis of the Cater Administration's urban policies.

In 1982, Lyall became a member of the faculty of the University of Wisconsin System. Hired as a professor of economics, she was subsequently appointed as the vice president for academic affairs and executive vice president of the university system. In 1992, she became the first woman to hold the position of president of the University of Wisconsin, which was the eighth largest university system in the United States, and comprised twenty-six campus locations with 160,000 students. After increasing private financial support and grant funding and overseeing multiple other improvements to the system, she retired in 2004.

Following her retirement from the University of Wisconsin, she served as a fellow at the Carnegie Foundation for the Advancement of Teaching in Palo Alto, California.

Preceded by Kenneth "Buzz" Shaw	President of the University of Wisconsin System; 1992-2004	Succeeded by Kevin P. Reilly
