= Kenneth Shaw =

American academic (born 1939)

Kenneth Alan "Buzz" Shaw (born January 31, 1939) is an American academic and university executive who served as the 10th Chancellor and President of Syracuse University, 4th President of the University of Wisconsin System, and 2nd President of the Southern Illinois University System.

== Biography ==
Born in Granite City, Illinois, Shaw received his bachelor's degree from Illinois State University, his masters from University of Illinois and his doctorate from Purdue University. Shaw taught at Rich Township High School in Park Forest, Illinois. He then taught at Illinois State University and did administrative work.

He is the author of more than 40 articles dealing with higher education and leadership. His first book, "The Successful President," was published in 1999; his second, "The Intentional Leader," which deals with the generic understandings and skills needed by every leader or would-be leader, was published in 2005.

In 1991, Shaw was recruited to be the Chancellor and President at Syracuse University by then Chair of Syracuse Board of Trustees H. Douglas Barclay. He retired from the position at the end of the 2003–2004 school year and was replaced by Nancy Cantor.

== Awards and recognition ==
Shaw was inducted as a Laureate of The Lincoln Academy of Illinois and awarded the Order of Lincoln (the State's highest honor) by the Governor of Illinois in 2008 in the area of Education.

Academic offices
Preceded by Robert M. O'Neil	President of the University of Wisconsin System; 1985–1991	Succeeded by Katharine Culbert Lyall
Preceded by Melvin A. Eggers	Chancellor of Syracuse University; 1991–2004	Succeeded by Nancy Cantor
