= UW Credit Union =

Credit Union

University of Wisconsin Credit Union
- Type: Credit union
- Industry: Financial services
- Founded: 1931
- Headquarters: Madison, Wisconsin, USA
- Key people: Paul J. Kundert, President and Chief Executive Officer
- Products: Savings; checking; consumer loans; mortgages; credit cards; investments; online banking
- Total assets: $6.30 billion USD
- Number of employees: More than 900
- Website: uwcu.org

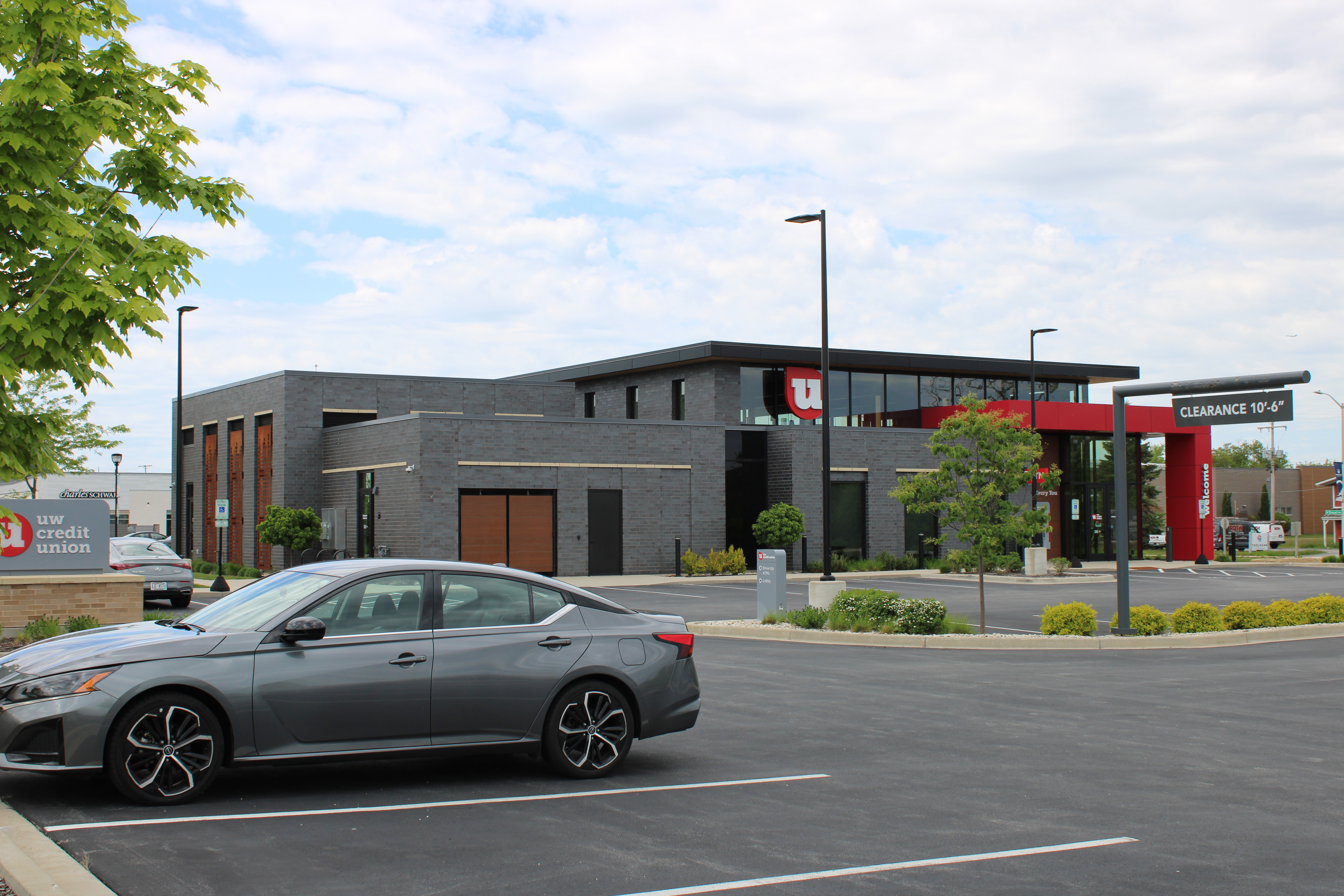
UW Credit Union in Oak Creek, Wisconsin

The University of Wisconsin Credit Union (doing business as UW Credit Union) is a credit union headquartered in Madison, Wisconsin. As of the end of 2025, UW Credit Union has about 387,000 members with $6.3 billion in assets and is the fourth largest credit union in the state of Wisconsin. UW Credit Union currently operates 31 full-service branches throughout the Madison and Milwaukee metropolitan areas, as well as single locations at or near UW System campuses in Whitewater, Green Bay, La Crosse, Oshkosh, and Stevens Point. It also provides over 100 surcharge-free ATMs in Wisconsin. UW Credit Union provides an array of financial services including educational loans, mortgages, consumer loans, checking, savings and investment products, credit and debit cards. UW Credit Union also offers digital banking services such as Web Branch (online banking), Mobile App and Wallet, Zelle, mobile deposit, online bill payment, automated phone banking system, and money transfers.

== History ==
Seven founding members signed the charter that would create the University of Wisconsin Faculty Credit Union in 1931. These members consisted of faculty members, graduate students, and professors of the University of Wisconsin–Madison. The University of Wisconsin Faculty Credit Union was renamed the University of Wisconsin Credit Union in 1970.

== Membership eligibility ==
UW Credit Union membership is open to students, faculty, staff, and alumni of the University of Wisconsin System, including all 26 campuses and the University of Wisconsin–Extension—as well as their immediate family and households. Likewise, Edgewood College and Madison College students, faculty, staff, alumni are eligible to join. Current and former employees of UW Health, the Wisconsin Interscholastic Athletic Association, Covance Clinical Research Units, and members of the community that live, work or attend school within 5 miles (8 km) of a branch are also welcome to be members.

Membership is also available to any Wisconsin resident who is enrolled or has attended an accredited institution of higher education nationwide.
