= University of Wisconsin–Platteville Richland =

Two-year college in Richland Center, Wisconsin, U.S., 1967-2023

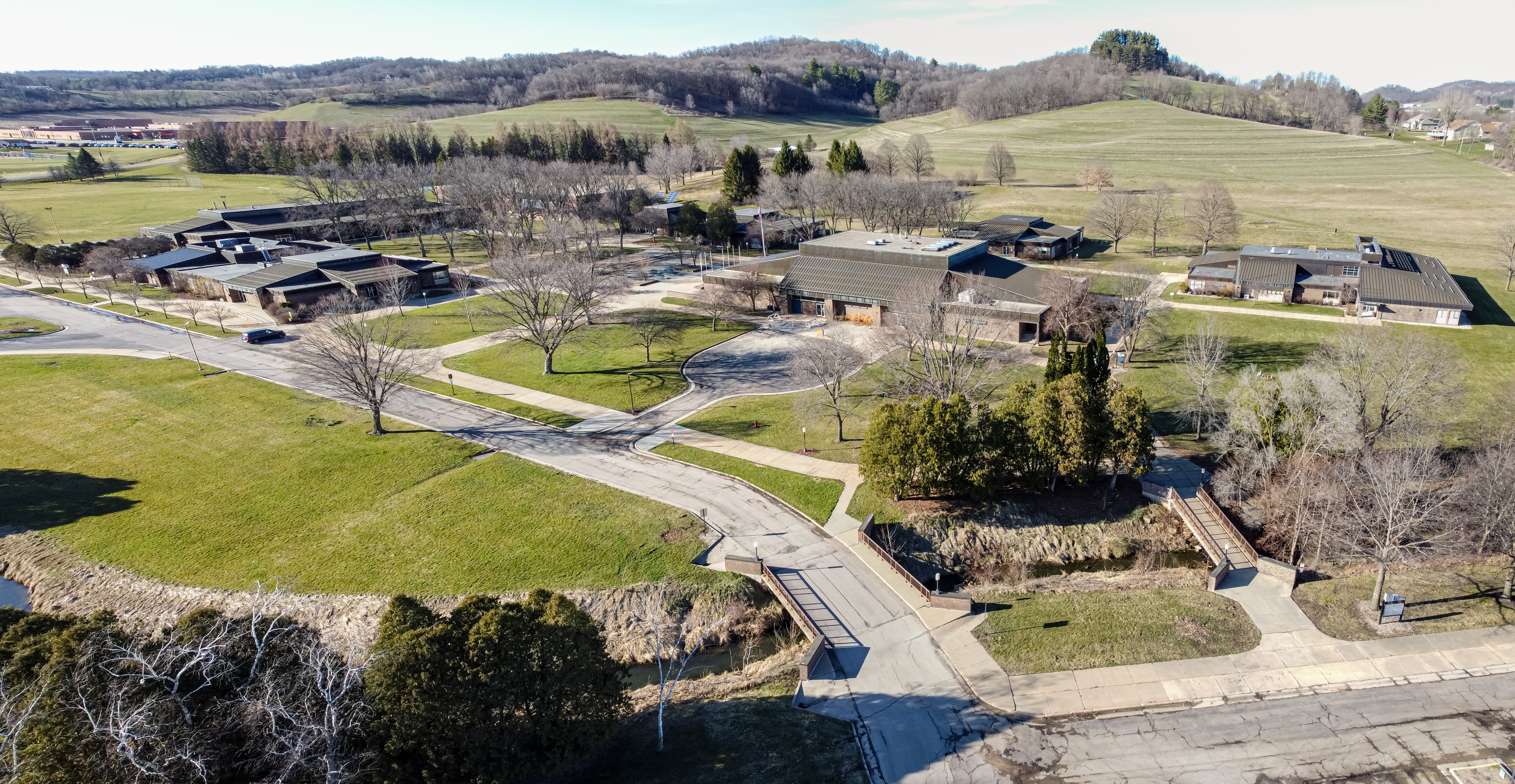
- Type: Public
- Active: 1967–May 2023
- Parent institution: University of Wisconsin System
- Location: Richland Center, Wisconsin, U.S. 43.3452°N 90.3978°W
- Colors: Royal blue and white, with red accents
- Mascot: Roadrunner
- Website: uwplatt.edu/richland

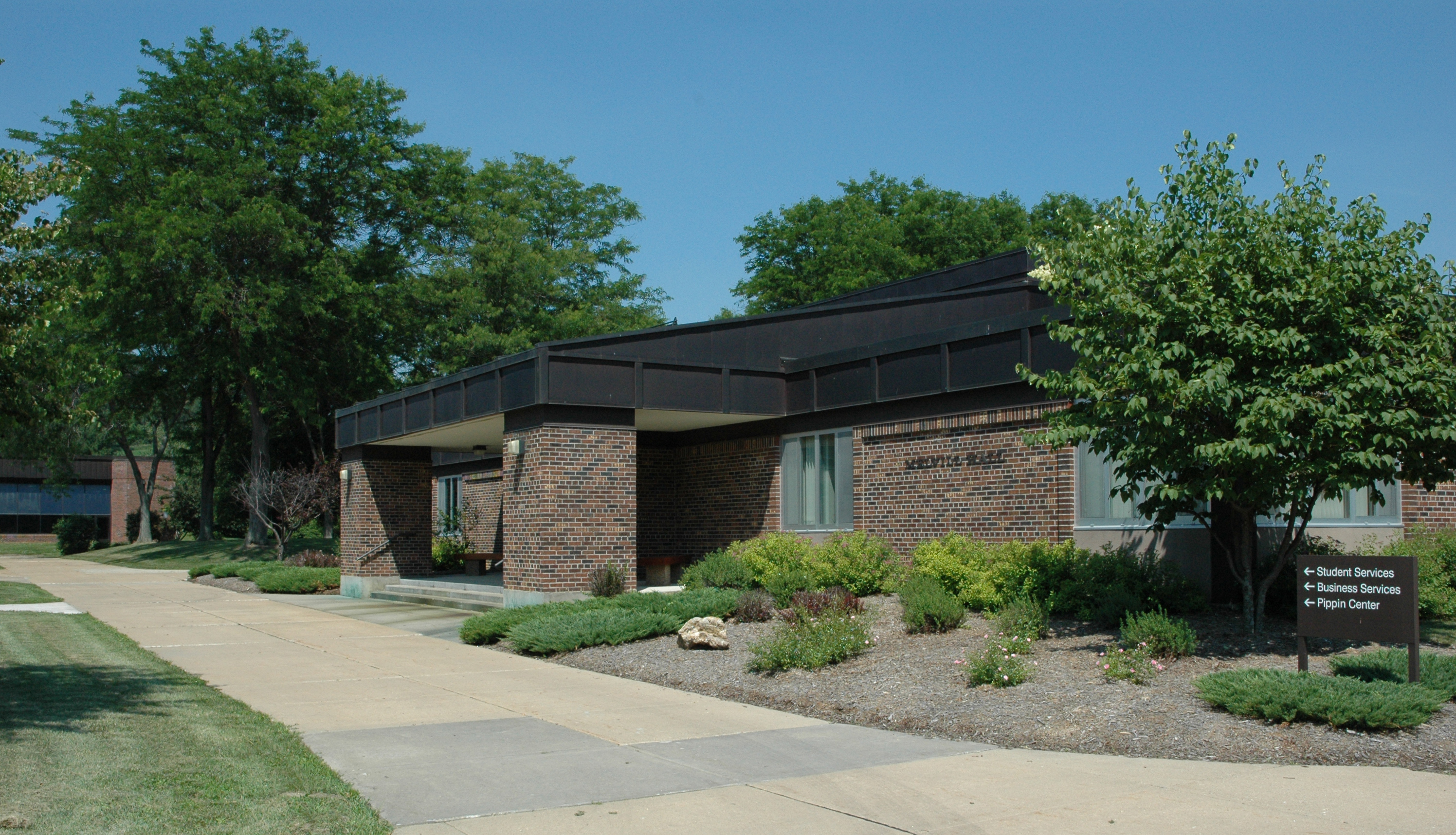
UW–Richland Melvill Hall

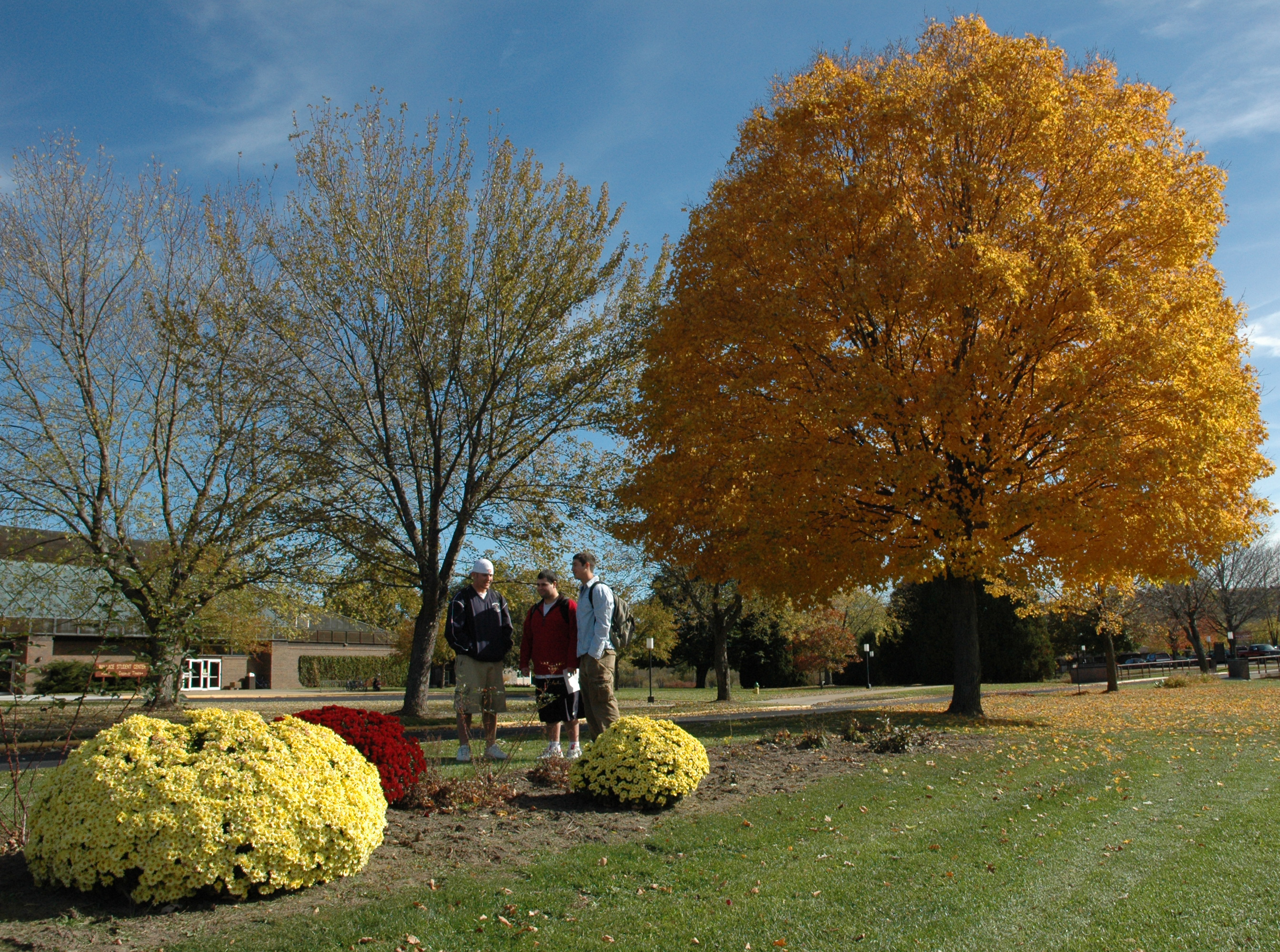
UW–Richland campus

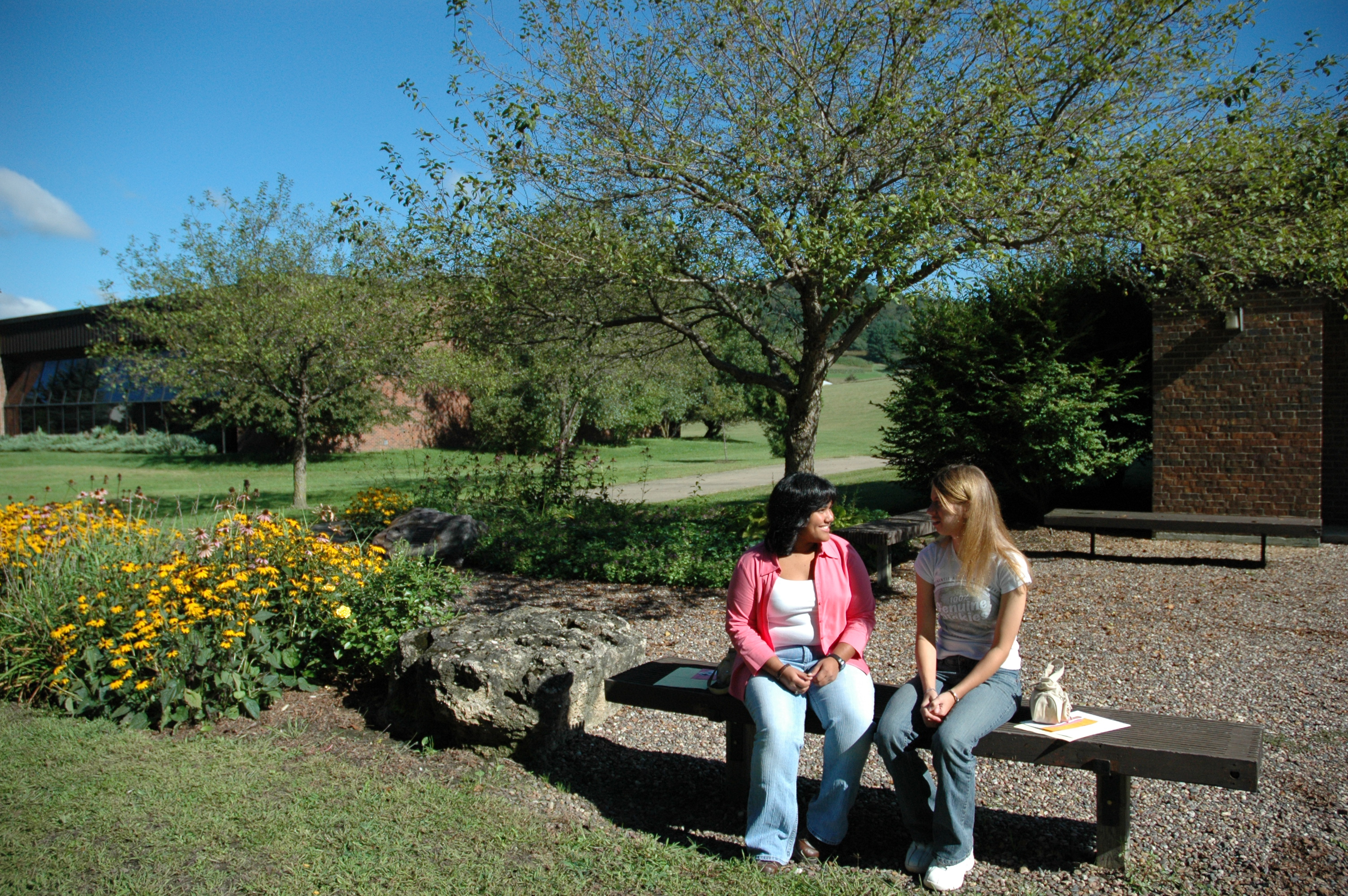
UW–Richland

The University of Wisconsin–Platteville Richland (formerly University of Wisconsin-Richland) was a two-year campus of the University of Wisconsin System located in Richland Center, Wisconsin, United States. The college was a satellite campus of the University of Wisconsin–Platteville. The college's last semester ended in May 2023.

UW–Richland was one of thirteen freshman-sophomore liberal arts transfer campuses of the University of Wisconsin Colleges, and offered a general education associate degree. In addition, UW-Richland offered the Bachelor of Applied Arts & Sciences.

== Campus ==
The campus was located on 135 acres (55 ha) in Richland Center, Wisconsin. UW–Richland had seven main buildings: Classroom Building, East Hall, Melvill Hall, Miller Memorial Library, Roadrunner Gymnasium, Science Hall, and Wallace Student Center/Coppertop Theatre. Improvements and expansions include construction of the community's on-campus Symons Recreation Complex in 1987, Campus View student housing in 1987, expanded in 1988 and 1999, renovation and expansion of Melvill Hall in 1998, and Science Hall in 2001. East Hall, a former county building adjacent to the campus, was renovated and became the newest UW-Richland building in 2010.

== History ==
Known as the University of Wisconsin–Platteville Richland, the campus opened in 1967 as the Richland Branch Campus of the Wisconsin State University-Platteville (now known as the University of Wisconsin–Platteville). With the 1972 merger of the University of Wisconsin and State University Systems, the campus became part of the University of Wisconsin Center System and was known as UW Center-Richland. In 1997, the name of the institution was changed to the University of Wisconsin Colleges and the campus name to UW–Richland. In July 2018, the UW Colleges system was restructured, and UW–Richland again became a satellite campus of UW–Platteville. In August 2018, the name was changed to the University of Wisconsin–Platteville Richland. On November 22, 2022 the University of Wisconsin System announced plans to end in-person classes at the campus, citing enrollment declines.

== Closure ==
It was announced on November 22, 2022, that the University of Wisconsin–Platteville Richland branch campus would close on July 1, 2023, due to its declining enrollment, which was 64 in its final year. Initially, there was a plan to make its classes be taught fully online. Ultimately, the campus was fully closed and its students had to transfer to the Platteville campus or Baraboo campus to continue their education. In 2023, the UWs stated "that no viable options existed" for the UWs to maintain a presence on the Richland campus.

Community leaders point to the decision to remove Richland's recruiter, transferring international students to UW–Platteville, and the numerous budget cuts as the reasons for its closure. Another suggested reason for the closure was a fee imposed for administrative services by UW–Platteville, a model not used by most other UW campuses. The Richland community has reported little recruitment for the branch campuses in the community. Additionally, UW–Platteville refused money from a private foundation to pay for a dedicated Richland recruiter.

== Academics ==
The campus offered an array of courses to begin any of more than 200 majors. Many UW–Richland students earned an Associate of Arts and Science degree or used the Guaranteed Transfer Program, under which students were guaranteed admission to a four-year University of Wisconsin System campus of their choice if they met certain academic requirements.

== Special programs ==
Starting in the mid-1980s, UW–Richland was a partner in several international programs, bringing students from around the world to Richland Center to live and learn. Activities enhanced outside-the-classroom learning and included a Student Senate/student government, Phi Theta Kappa honor society, the International Club, the Student Wisconsin Education Association chapter Educators of the Future, and more.

== Athletics ==
A former member of the Wisconsin Collegiate Conference, UW–Richland offered men's and women's basketball and women's volleyball, as well as club soccer and intramural sports. UW–Richland's mascot was the Roadrunner and school colors were royal blue and white, with red accents.

== See also ==
- Wisconsin Technical College System
