= University of Wisconsin Colleges Online =

Online college program

- Type: Public, State University
- Established: 1998
- Chancellor: Cathy Sandeen
- Location: Madison, Wisconsin, US
- Campus: Cyberspace
- Website: http://online.uwc.edu/

The University of Wisconsin Colleges Online was an online college program part of the University of Wisconsin Colleges, the freshman-and-sophomore campuses of the University of Wisconsin System. It was replaced by the University of Wisconsin Extended Campus Associate of Arts and Sciences Degree (AAS).

University of Wisconsin Colleges Online allowed students to earn an Associate of Arts and Science Degree (AAS) completely online. Students enrolled at a University of Wisconsin four-year campus were allowed to take courses through the UW Colleges Online to supplement their university course load. Credits earned in this fashion were transferred to their home campus. Students were also allowed to use financial aid from their home campus.

UW Colleges Online was fully accredited by the Higher Learning Commission, a Commission of the North Central Association of Colleges and Schools. UW Colleges Online adhered to the Guidelines for Distance Education espoused by the North Central Association (NCA) Commission on Institutions of Higher Education.

UW Colleges Online used Desire2Learn as its course management system (CMS). Courses were offered during three terms: Spring, Summer, and Fall. As of 2009, there were no self-paced course offerings available.
