= Renée M. Wachter =

Chancellor of the University of Wisconsin–Superior

10th Chancellor of the University of Wisconsin–Superior
- Incumbent
- Assumed office July 2011
- Preceded by: Julius Erlenbach

Personal details
- Born: November 16, 1966 (age 59)
- Education: University of Kansas (BS); Kelley School of Business (PhD)

Academic background
- Thesis: An empirical investigation of the effects of communication media differences and the social relationship of individuals on the performance of two-party negotiations. (1993)

Academic work
- Institutions: University of Wisconsin–Superior; Truman State University; Montana State University; University of Indianapolis; Ball State University

Renée M. Wachter (born November 16, 1966) is the tenth chancellor of the University of Wisconsin–Superior. She is currently the interim President of the Universities of Wisconsin System. Prior to her arrival at UW-Superior in 2011, she served as the founding Dean of the School of Business at Truman State University and member of the Council of Public Liberal Arts Colleges.

== Early life and education ==
Wachter was born on November 16, 1966. She graduated from the University of Kansas with a Bachelor of Science degree in Business and completed her PhD from Kelley School of Business at Indiana University Bloomington.

== Career ==
Upon completing her PhD, Wachter joined the faculty at the University of Indianapolis and taught management and information technology classes at Ball State University. During her tenure at these institutions, she was named an Associate Dean of their School of Business and Director of Graduate Business Programs. In 2003, after fielding numerous deanship offers, Wachter accepted a leadership position at Montana State University. She remained in Montana for three years before being appointed dean of the Business and Accountancy Division at Truman State University.

As a result of her accomplishments, Wachter was shortlisted for the position of the next Chancellor of the University of Wisconsin–Superior. She eventually accepted the position for the 2011–12 academic year.
