= University of Wisconsin–Green Bay, Sheboygan Campus =

University in Sheboygan, Wisconsin, U.S.

Coordinates: 43°44′13″N 87°45′18″W

UW–Green Bay, Sheboygan Campus
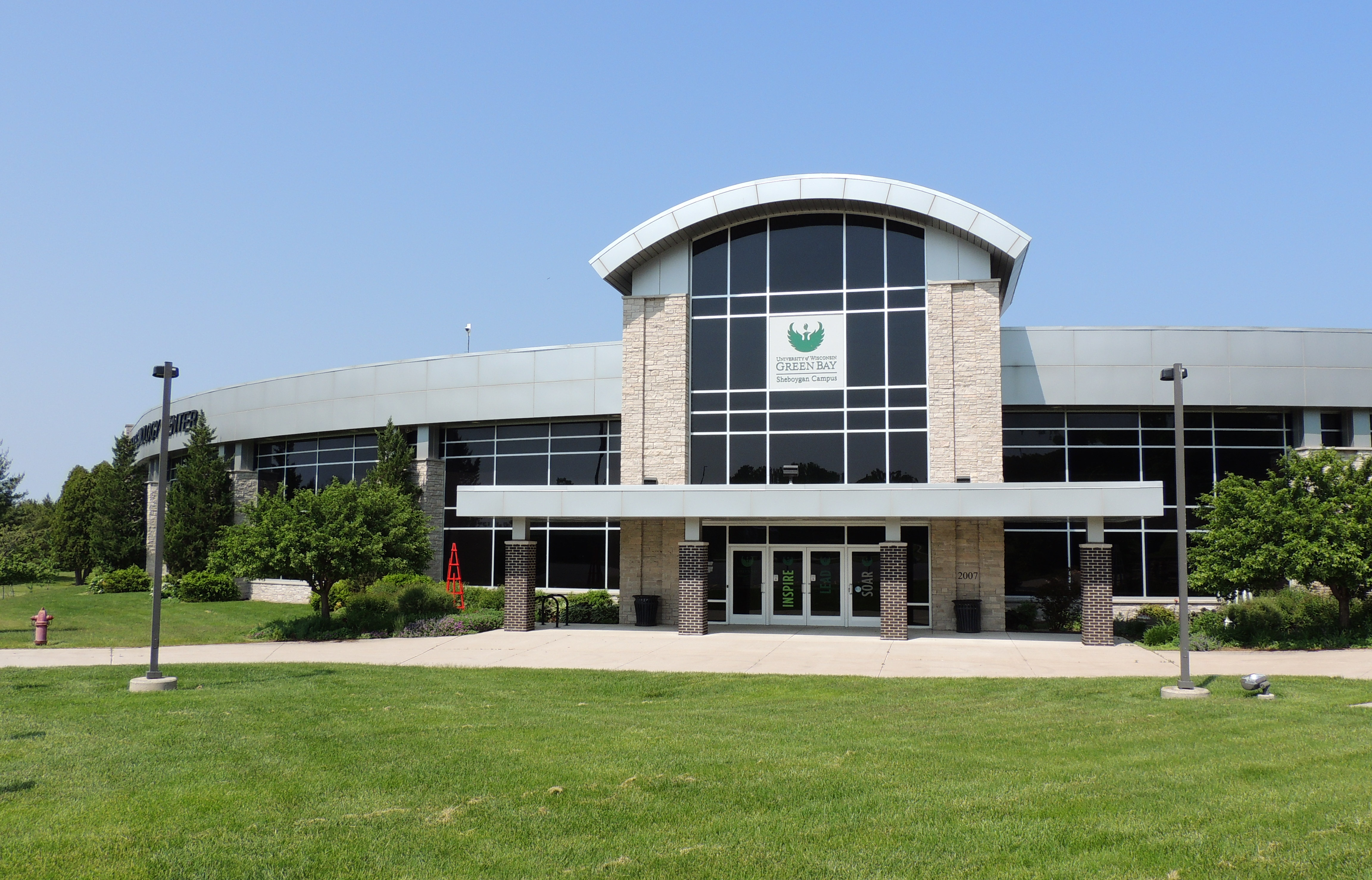
- Former names: UW–Sheboygan, Sheboygan County Center
- Type: University
- Established: 1933
- Parent institution: University of Wisconsin–Green Bay
- Location: One University Drive; Sheboygan, Wisconsin; United States
- Website: www.uwgb.edu/sheboygan

The University of Wisconsin–Green Bay, Sheboygan Campus (UW–Green Bay, Sheboygan Campus) is a university in Sheboygan, in the U.S. state of Wisconsin.

== History ==
It was established in 1933 in space provided by the Sheboygan School of Technical, Vocational and Adult Education, within Sheboygan's Central High School. During its first semester of operation, the campus (then known as The Sheboygan County Center) offered six credits of coursework. A full range of courses did not become available until 1936 when a chemistry lab was installed. Sophomore courses were added, but with the advent of the World War II, low enrollments forced the program to be curtailed. Following the war, classes were restored.

After the war, enrollment increased dramatically, climbing from 30 students in 1945 to 152 in 1946. A period of reduced enrollment followed in the 1950s, but this trend quickly reversed by 1958 when enrollment surged to 140 students and has continued to grow since then.

With the closing of Central High School in 1961, the Vocational School moved into the renovated area vacated by the high school, leaving UW–Sheboygan as the sole occupant of the older wing of the building. As the campus's programs grew, it quickly became apparent that new facilities were needed.

In 1961, civic leaders and university officials began to consider the possibility of a new campus. As interest grew, the project soon took on county-wide interest. A year later, the Sheboygan County Board approved a $1.1 million bond issue to finance the project. The current campus was then situated on a more than 70-acre (28 ha) semi-rural site on the southwestern outskirts of the City of Sheboygan, and shares the site with Sheboygan Area Lutheran High School.

UW–Sheboygan is one of the thirteen UW Colleges in the state. The merger of the University of Wisconsin System and the State University System in 1972 resulted in the University of Wisconsin System and united the UW Colleges' campuses in its mission under the name University of Wisconsin Center System. In 1983, the name of the institution became the University of Wisconsin Centers. In 1997, the name of the institution was changed to University of Wisconsin Colleges. In 1999, the studios of Charter Communications' public access station WSCS were moved to UW–Sheboygan. The school has also continued to maintain their own public access channel since the inauguration of cable service in the Sheboygan area in 1982.

Improvements and expansions continue on the UW–Sheboygan campus. In 2004, UW–Sheboygan dedicated the new Brotz Science Building, which houses classrooms and science laboratories. In May 2006, the campus broke ground on the new Acuity Technology Center, which will house the college's library and provide additional "smart" classrooms and meeting space.

== Athletics ==
UW-Sheboygan's athletic teams were nicknamed the Wombats and competed in the Wisconsin Collegiate Conference. The university competed in women's volleyball, men and women's golf, soccer, men's basketball, and men and women's tennis.

UW-Sheboygan was the home of Wisconsin Basketball Hall of Fame Coach Jack Snyder. Snyder coached the men's basketball team for 24 years and compiled 356 wins at the university.

The athletic program was discontinued in 2022.

== Gallery ==
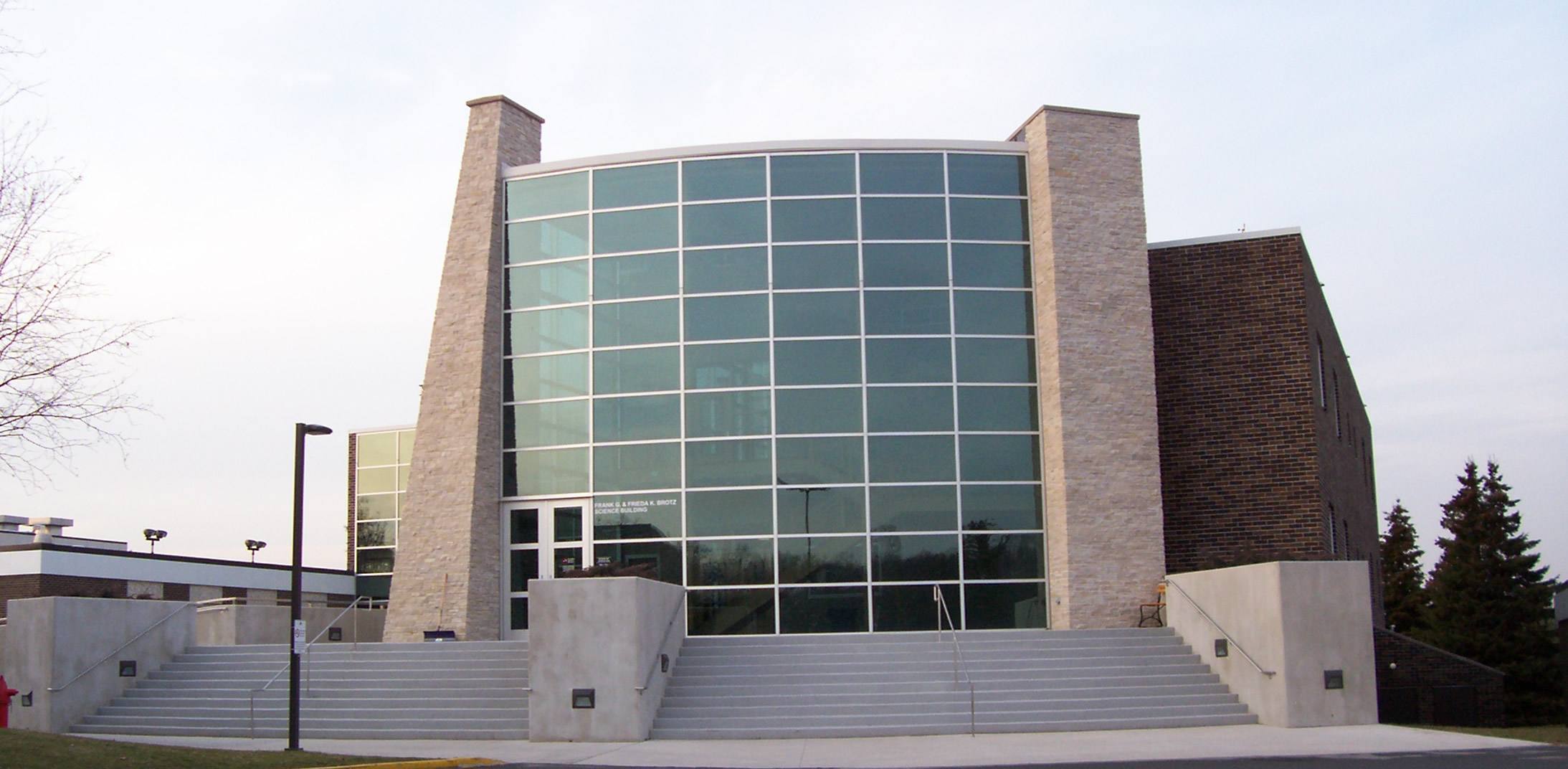
The Brotz Science building

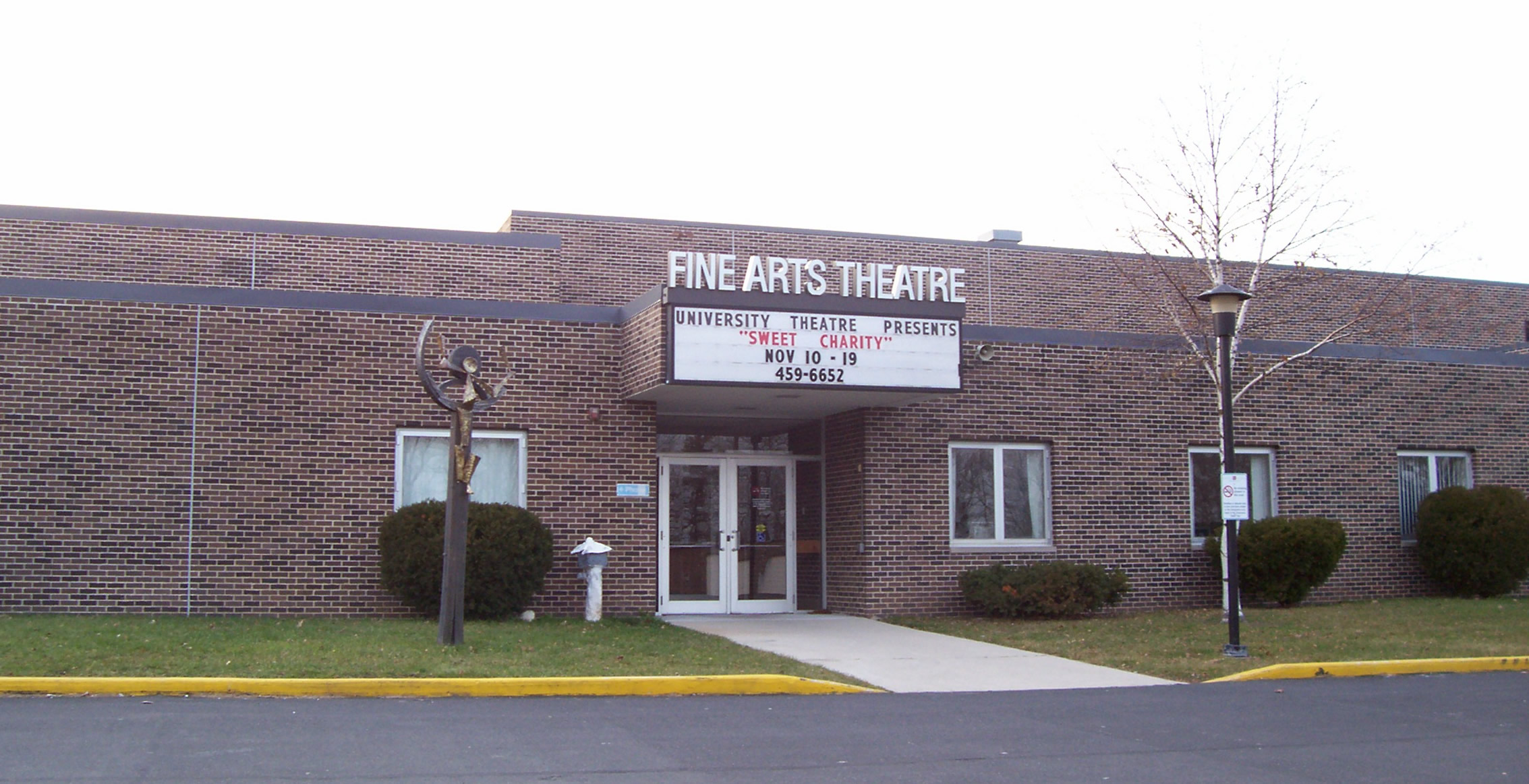
The Fine Arts Theatre
