= University of Wisconsin–Green Bay, Marinette Campus =

Two-year college in Marinette, Wisconsin, U.S.

Coordinates: 45°04′20″N 87°36′50″W

UW–Green Bay, Marinette Campus
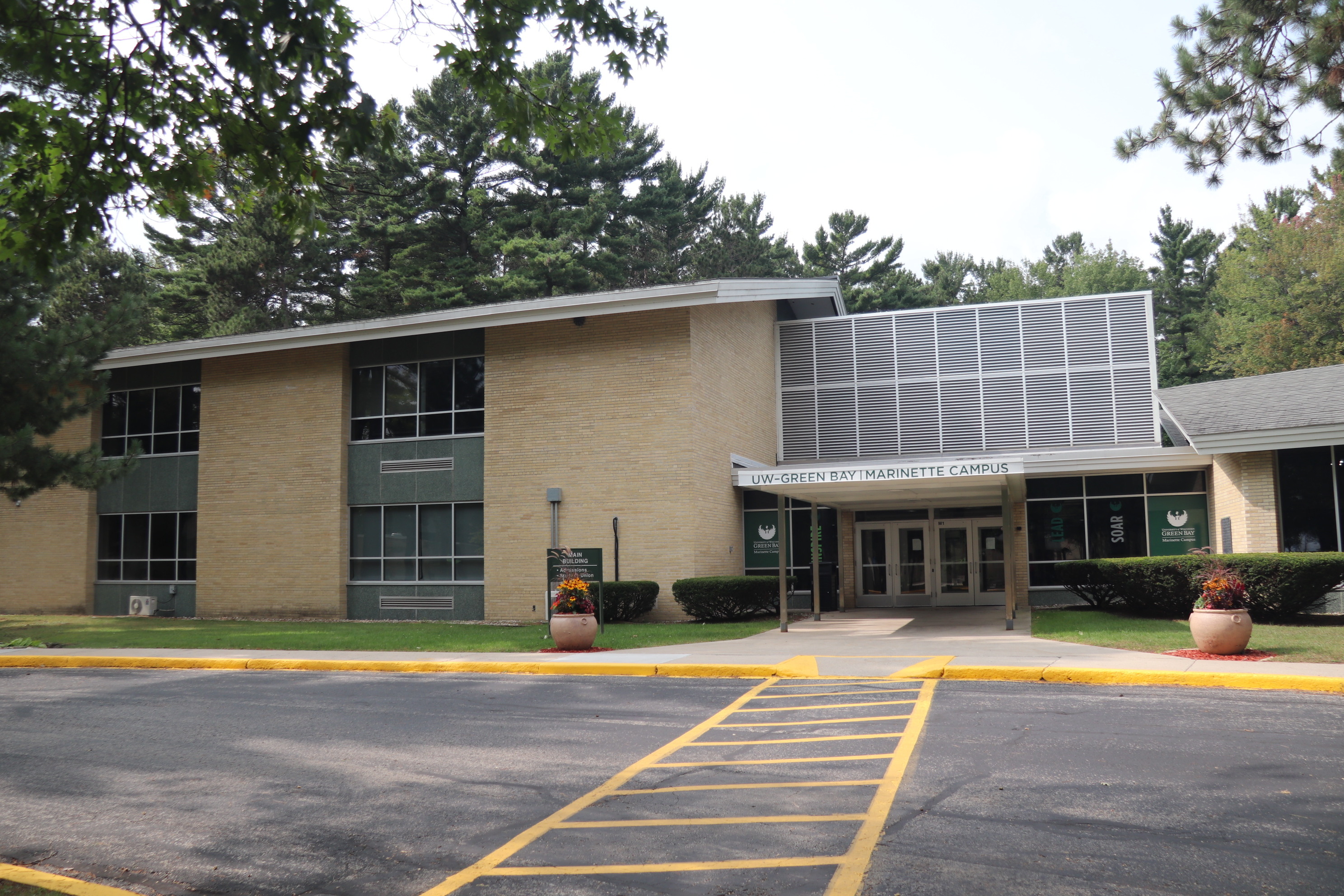
- Main Building
- Former names: UW–Marinette, UW–Extension – Marinette Center
- Type: Public, state university
- Established: 1935
- Parent institution: University of Wisconsin-Green Bay
- Location: Marinette, Wisconsin, U.S.
- Campus: Suburban, 36 acres (14.6 ha)
- Colors: Green and white
- Mascot: Buccaneers
- Website: www.uwgb.edu/marinette

The University of Wisconsin–Green Bay, Marinette Campus (or UW–Green Bay, Marinette Campus), part of the University of Wisconsin Colleges, is a two-year campus of the University of Wisconsin System located in Marinette, Wisconsin, United States.

== Campus ==
UW–Green Bay, Marinette Campus is one of 13 freshman-sophomore liberal arts transfer campuses in the UW System and offers a general education associate degree. After beginning their studies at UW–Green Bay, Marinette Campus, students may transfer to other UW System institutions as well as to colleges and universities throughout the country to complete their bachelor's degrees. The college offers bachelor's degree programs from four 4-year colleges in Wisconsin which can be completed online.

The campus consists of 36 acres (15 ha) on the Bay of Green Bay of Lake Michigan.

== History ==
This campus first began in 1935 when the old Marinette High School and its 25 students had some class offers from the University of Wisconsin Extension. The need for education was dramatically increased as the end of World War II was approaching. With the teamwork of the City of Marinette and the UW–Extension, they both managed to offer college freshman classes at Marinette Vocational School (Now called Lincoln School). In the years 1951–1963, Joe Gerend was the director of the UW–Extension Marinette Center. Then, in 1963, Lon W. Weber became the next director.

In the year 1964, the University of Wisconsin Colleges had a new separate unit: The University Center System. For the center's final year at the Vocational School, 89 freshman students became enrolled. During that same year, an agreement came upon both the University of Wisconsin and the Marinette County Board of Supervisors to build a campus on Marinette. The faculty would be provided by the university and the buildings would be provided by the county. On October 12 of that same year, the 36 acres (15 ha) of the pine woods became the place for the construction for the campus. In 1965, the doors of the new faculty opened to welcome students of the 1965–1966 academic year where 232 enrolled. In 1966, a two phase building program was authorized by the Marinette County Board of Supervisors to expand the campus for a further enrollment capacity.

In the year 1968, James Olson became appointed as the Campus Dean of a few UW colleges, including UW–Marinette as one of those campuses. During January of that year came the construction of the UW–Marinette Fine Arts Building. In August 1969, (About one year later) there was also the construction of the Library Learning Center and the Max E. Peterson Field House. On July 1, 1972, the campus of Marinette was transferred from UW–Green Bay and became a new extended Center System.

In July 2018, the UW System was restructured so that UW–Marinette became a UW–Green Bay campus. In August 2018, the name was officially changed to University of Wisconsin–Green Bay, Marinette Campus or UW–Green Bay, Marinette Campus.

In January 2024, it was announced that the Marinette campus would move all instruction online beginning in the fall of 2024. The Universities of Wisconsin system will still maintain the campus as a community space.

== Images ==
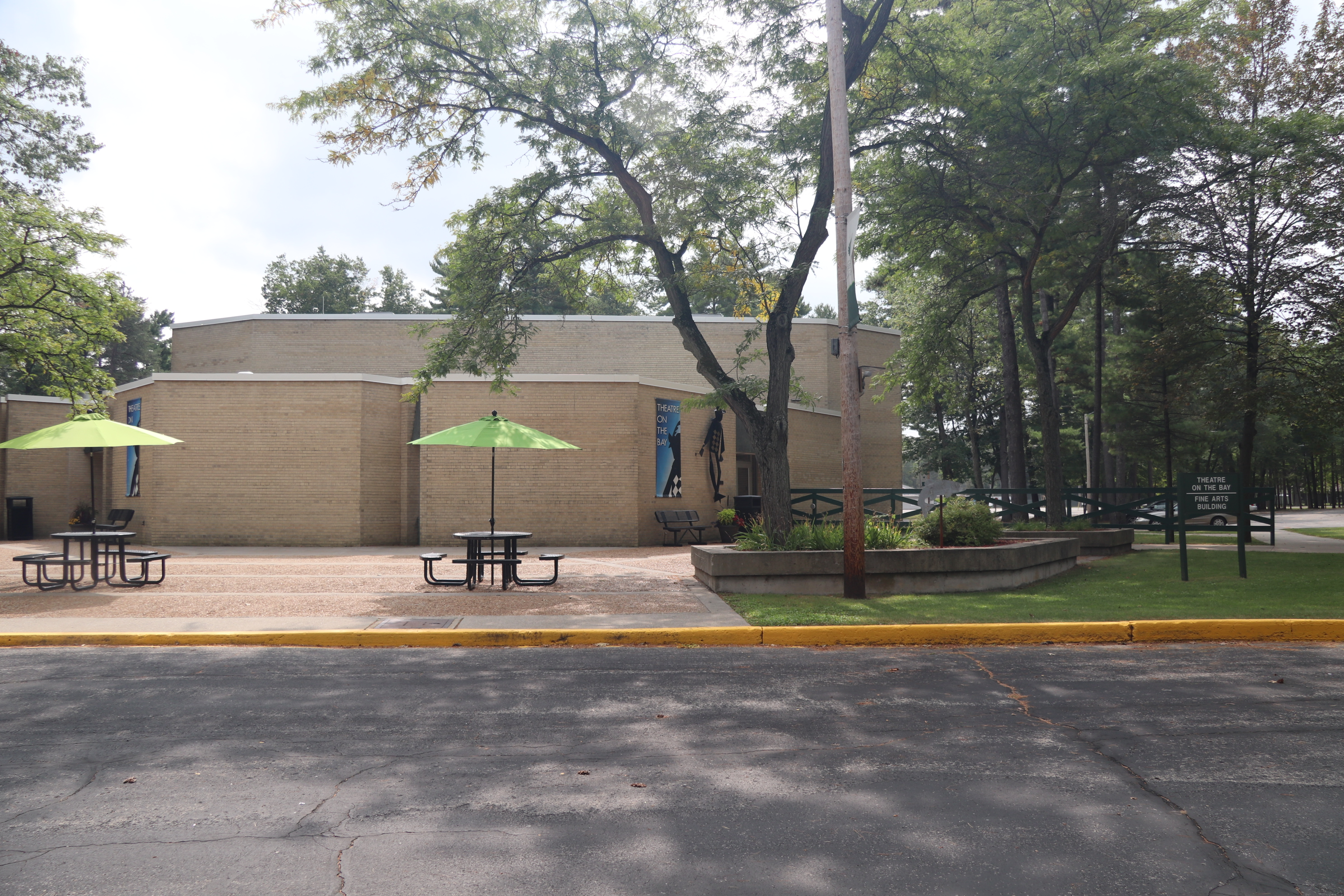
Theatre on the Bay building

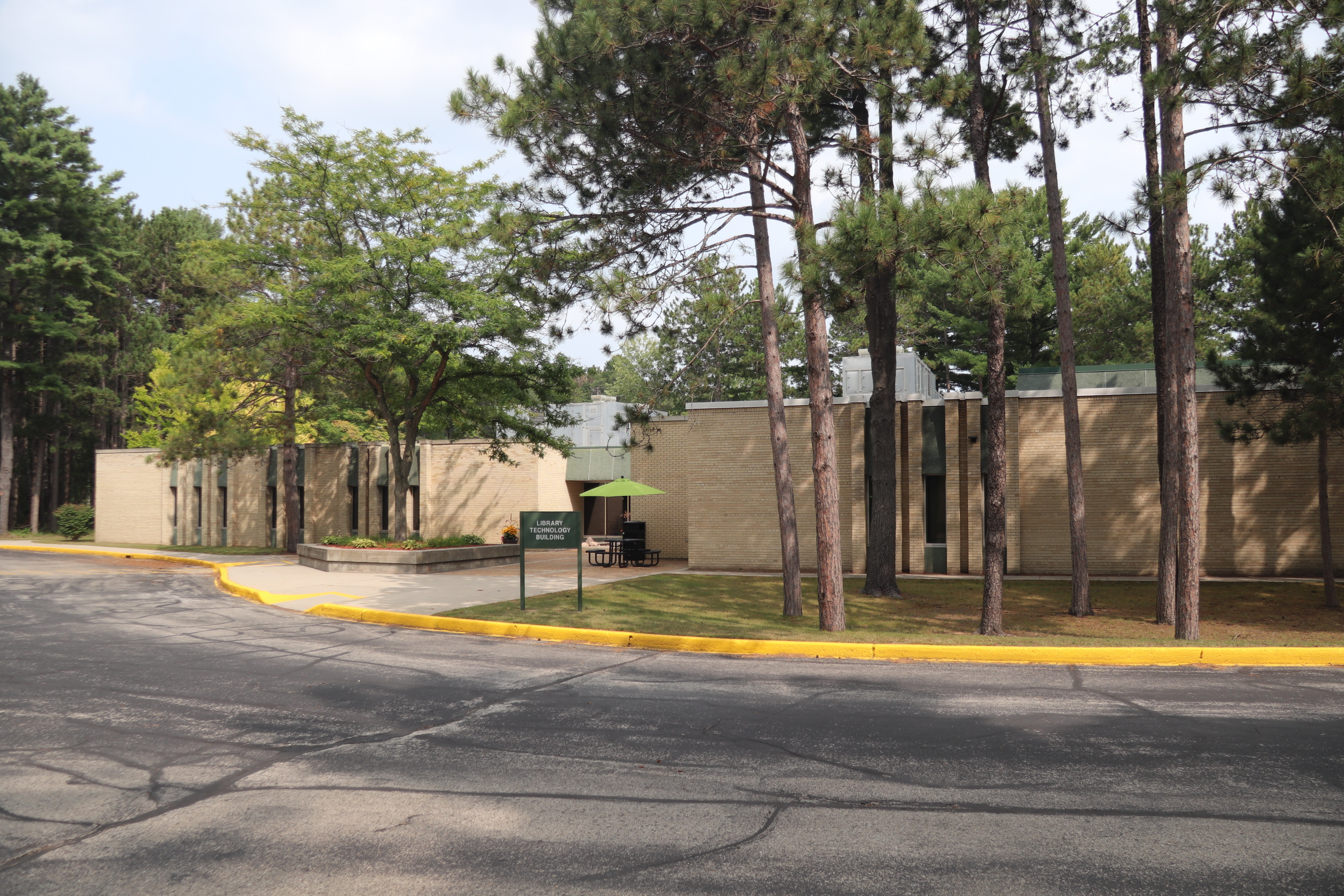
Library Technology building

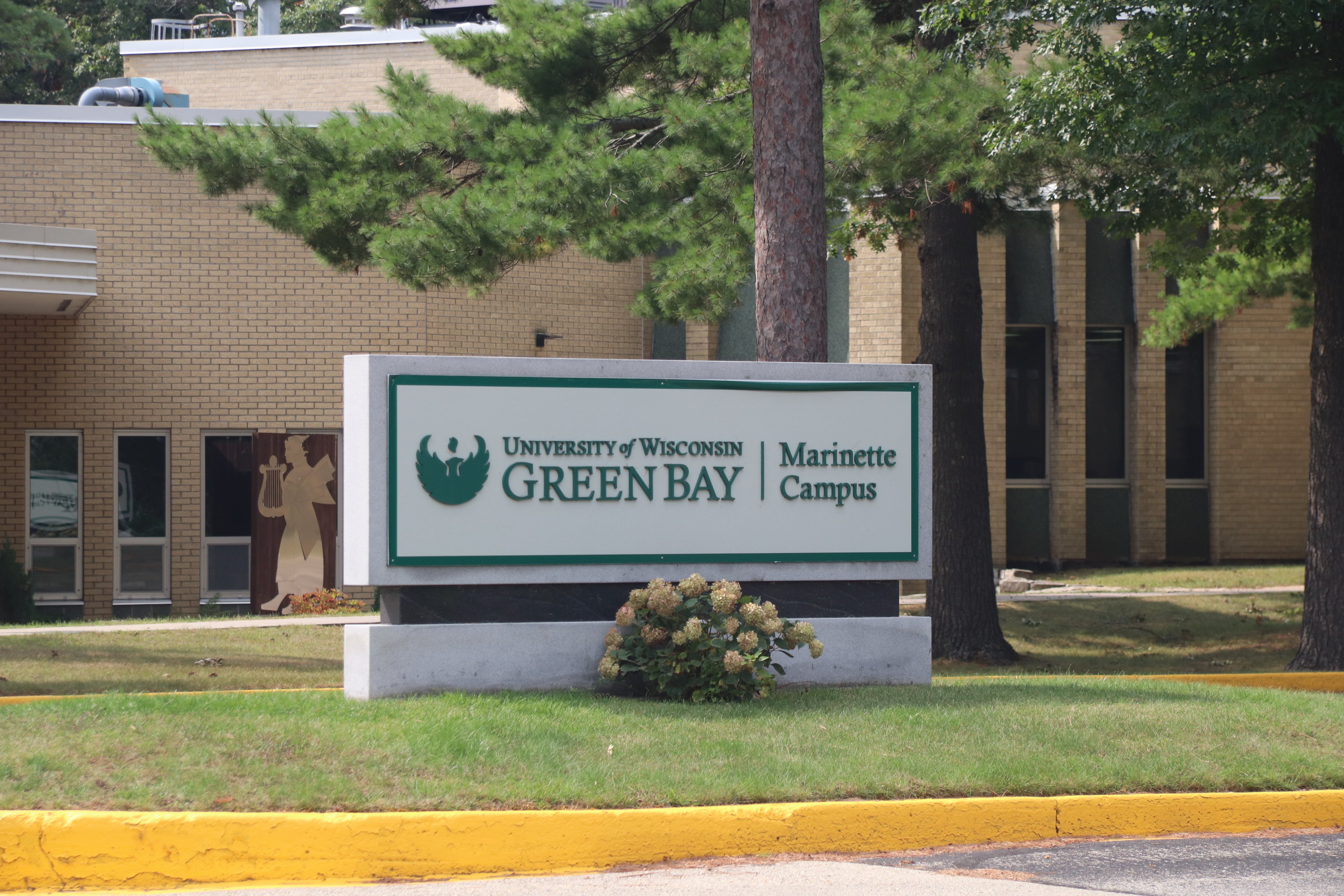
Sign

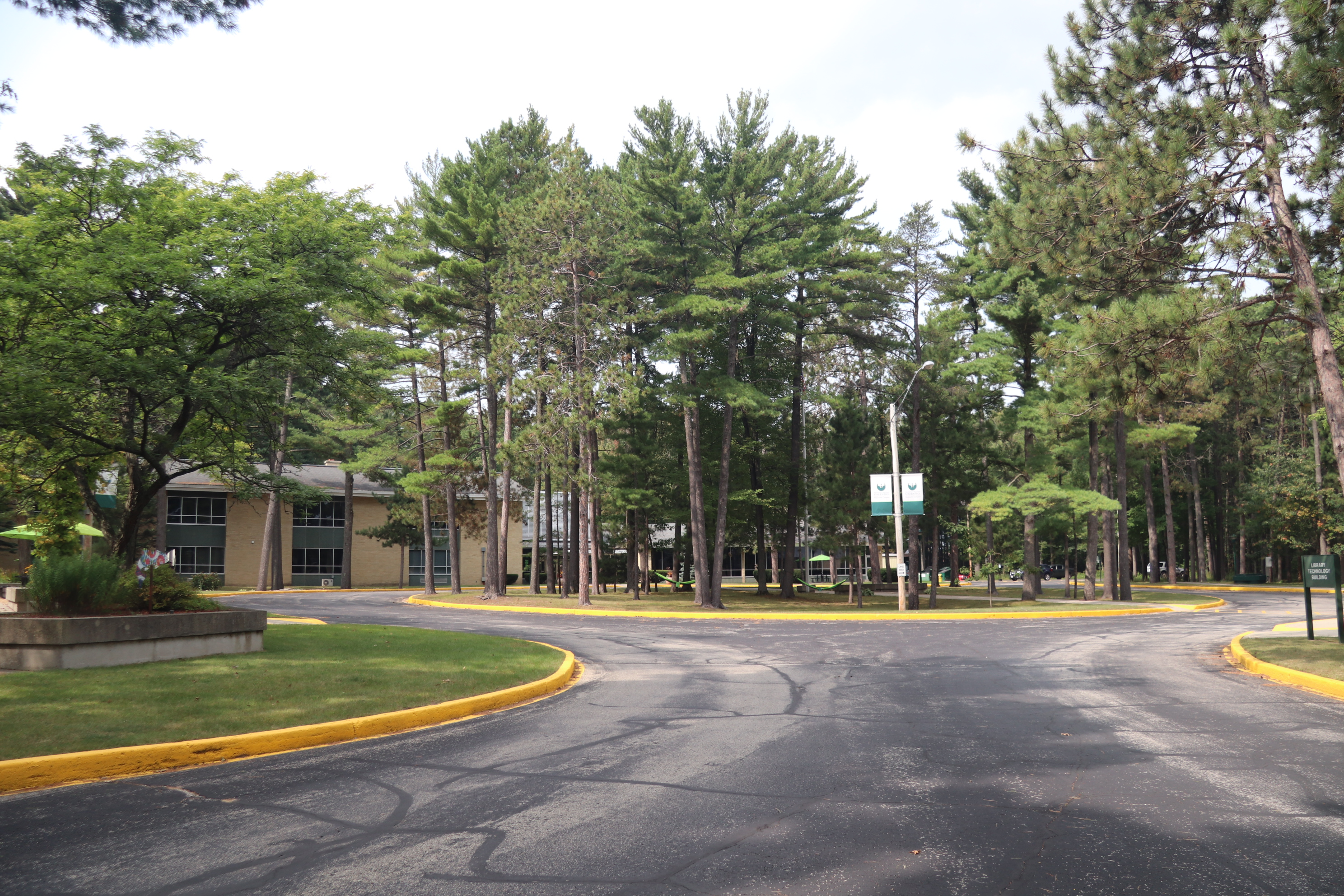
Circle in center of campus
