= University of Wisconsin–Milwaukee at Waukesha =

Former two-year college in Waukesha, Wisconsin, U.S.

Coordinates: 43°01′40″N 88°16′06″W

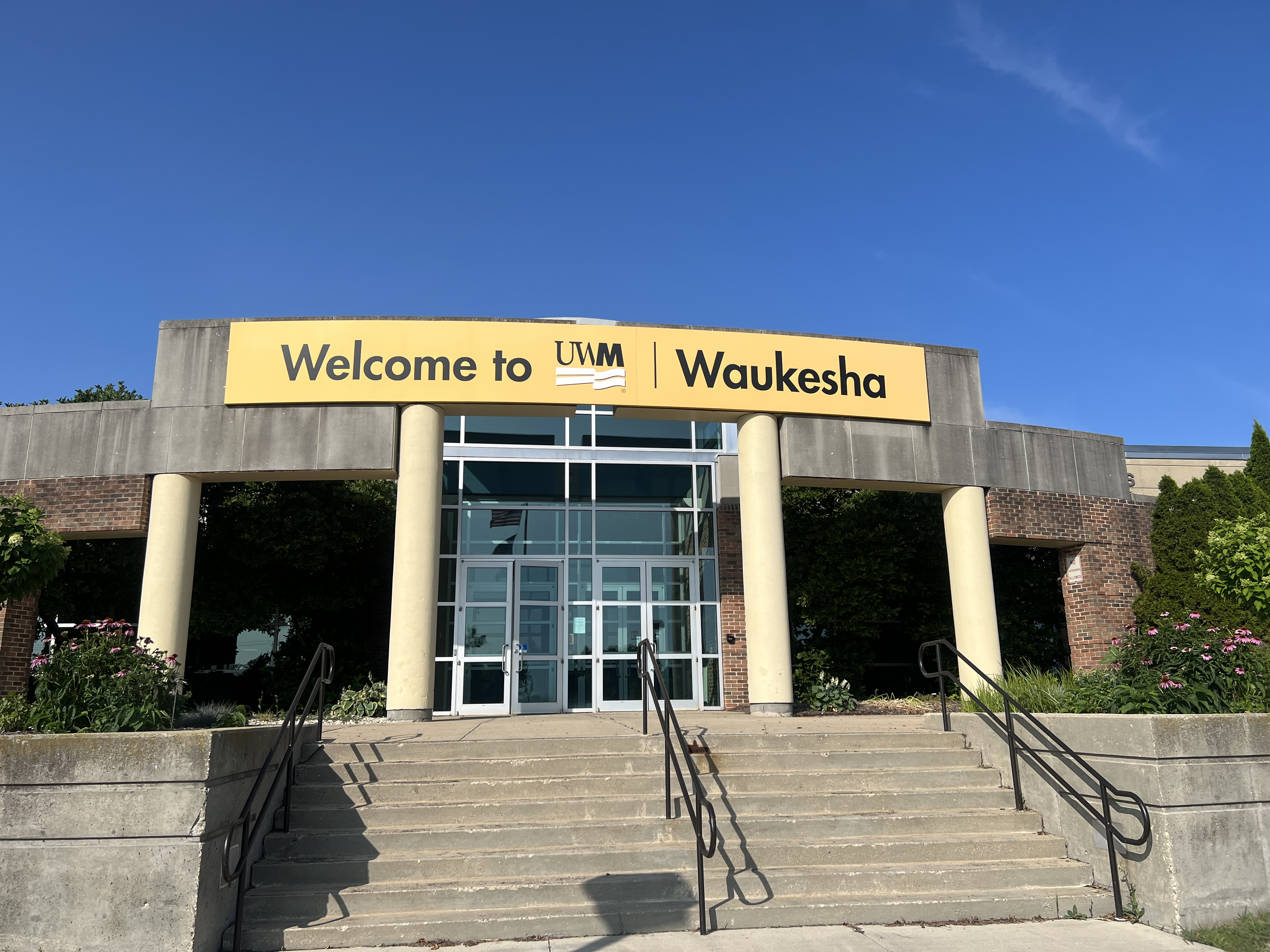
- Type: State university
- Active: 1966–2025
- Location: Waukesha, Wisconsin, United States
- Campus: Suburban
- Colors: Green and Gold
- Nickname: Panthers
- Mascot: Pounce
- Website: uwm.edu/generalstudies/about/waukesha-closure/

The University of Wisconsin–Milwaukee at Waukesha was a two-year college located in Waukesha, in the U.S. state of Wisconsin. A branch campus of the University of Wisconsin–Milwaukee, it was part of the University of Wisconsin System. Like the other two-year UW campuses, UWM at Waukesha's land and buildings belonged to a local government unit, in this case Waukesha County. As part of the local-state partnership, the University of Wisconsin provided faculty, staff, educational programs, technology, furnishings, libraries, and supplies. In 2018, the college became a regional campus of the University of Wisconsin–Milwaukee, after previously being a part of the University of Wisconsin Colleges. The campus closed at the end of the spring 2025 semester.

== History ==
Waukesha County purchased the 86-acre (35 ha) campus from William J. and Blanche Hughes, in March 1965. The first buildings on the campus were erected in 1966 on an 86-acre site near the geographic center of Waukesha County. The first classes met in fall 1966 at Mt. St. Paul Seminary because the new buildings were not ready for occupancy. In December 1966 the campus opened in its current location, beginning with Northview Hall, the Library, the Field House, and the Commons. Southview Hall opened in February 1969, and both the Administration Building and an extension to Northview Hall, were added in 1978. An 18,000 square feet (1,700 m^{2}) addition to the Library was added in 1979. The Fine Arts Center, with its 337-seat Lunt-Fontanne Theatre, came in 1987. In 1992, a computer center, and a new entryway to Northview Hall added 5,000 square feet (460 m^{2}) to buildings on the campus.

In celebration of the campus's 30th anniversary, the Student Commons was completely remodeled and Westview Hall was added. Dedicated on September 8, 1996, the $5.7 million project added 20,000 square feet (1,900 m^{2}) to the Commons and renovated an existing 29,000 square feet (2,700 m^{2}). Along with expanded space for the student lounge, student activities, student services and study center offices, a dining area and re-located bookstore were added.

In 2001, a new gym floor was installed in the Field House, and the building was remodeled and expanded to include three classrooms and a fitness center, adding 9,885 square feet (918.3 m^{2}).

To preserve a natural environment for educational use, Gertrude Sherman donated a 92-acre (37 ha) field station, located approximately 10 miles (16 km) west of the main campus, to the university in 1967. The former farm land is being restored to native prairie and woods, and it harbors the UW System's only large wood-fired kiln, and as well as a smaller one. In 2001 a 3,000-square-foot (280 m^{2}) classroom building was constructed on the site. The Gertrude Sherman Building includes one general classroom and one devoted to art. The Wildlife in Need Center moved its headquarters to the field station site in 2011. The Field Station Prairie was named in honor of long-time Field Station Manager, Marlin Johnson, on Earth Day in 2015.

In the summer of 2018, the campus was merged with the University of Wisconsin–Milwaukee and became, along with the UW Milwaukee at Washington County campus, part of the College of General Studies at UWM.

The Universities of Wisconsin system announced in March 2024 that the campus would close in spring 2025. There will be an expansion in offered courses within the two Liberal Arts transfer associate degree programs at nearby Waukesha County Technical College to fill the gap at the associates level. The UWM University Center at WCTC will also be opened so students will be able to complete upper level courses in certain fields on site from University of Wisconsin-Milwaukee faculty after receiving their associates degree from Waukesha County Technical College.

Students, through their segregated fees, support services to students such as student organizations and student development programming, peer tutoring services, mental health counseling services, career and internship services, Diversity Center, Veterans Center, LGBTQIA Center, and more.

== Closure ==
The University of Wisconsin–Milwaukee at Waukesha branch campus announced on March 11, 2024, that it would close at the end of the spring 2025 semester. The campus had an enrollment of 672 at the time of the announcement. Following its closure, UW–Milwaukee closed its College of General Studies, a college that supported the academic departments of its branch campuses. Its chancellor called the branch campus program "no longer cost effective." Specifically, chancellor Mone pointed to duplication of programs with Waukesha County Technical College. The university laid off the college's 32 tenured faculty, instead of transferring them to the Milwaukee campus. This was made possible by a policy by Scott Walker in 2016 that removed guarantees to tenured faculty. The Waukesha campus is scheduled for demolition and set to become a housing development after it closes in June 2025.

== Campus ==
UW–Waukesha's land and buildings belong to Waukesha County, which purchased the 86-acre (35 ha) land from William J. Hughes and his wife, Blanche I. Fischer Hughes, in March 1965. As part of a local-state partnership, the University of Wisconsin provides faculty, staff, educational programs, technology, furnishings, libraries, and supplies.

== Student profile ==
About 2,000 students attended each fall and spring semester and another 1,000 took summer classes. Many community residents became involved in the campus non-credit classes offered through Continuing Education.

=== Enrollment for fall 2013 ===
- Headcount: 2,155 credit; FTE 1,569 credit; 2,907 non-credit
  - Full-time: 47%
  - Part-time: 53%
  - Female: 47%
  - Male: 53%
  - Ethnic minority: 9%
  - Receiving financial aid: 43%

== Curriculum ==
UW–Waukesha's curriculum broadly covered the humanities, natural and mathematical sciences, and social sciences. The school offered a Bachelor of Arts and Sciences but many students went on to receive their bachelor's degree at other institutions.

== Notable faculty ==
- Tien Hung-mao, political scientist, Taiwanese politician
- Edward Jackamonis, speaker of the Wisconsin State Assembly
- Neal Nelson, Hall of Fame coach.
- William Wegman, American artist.
