= Pennewill =

Pennewill is a surname. Notable people with the surname include:

- Simeon S. Pennewill (1867–1935), American farmer and politician
- James Pennewill (1854–1935), chief justice of the Delaware Supreme Court
- William Ellison Pennewill (1907–1942), American aviator
  - USS Pennewill, an American World War II-era ship
