= S. Anna Gordon =

American physician and academic (1831–1900)

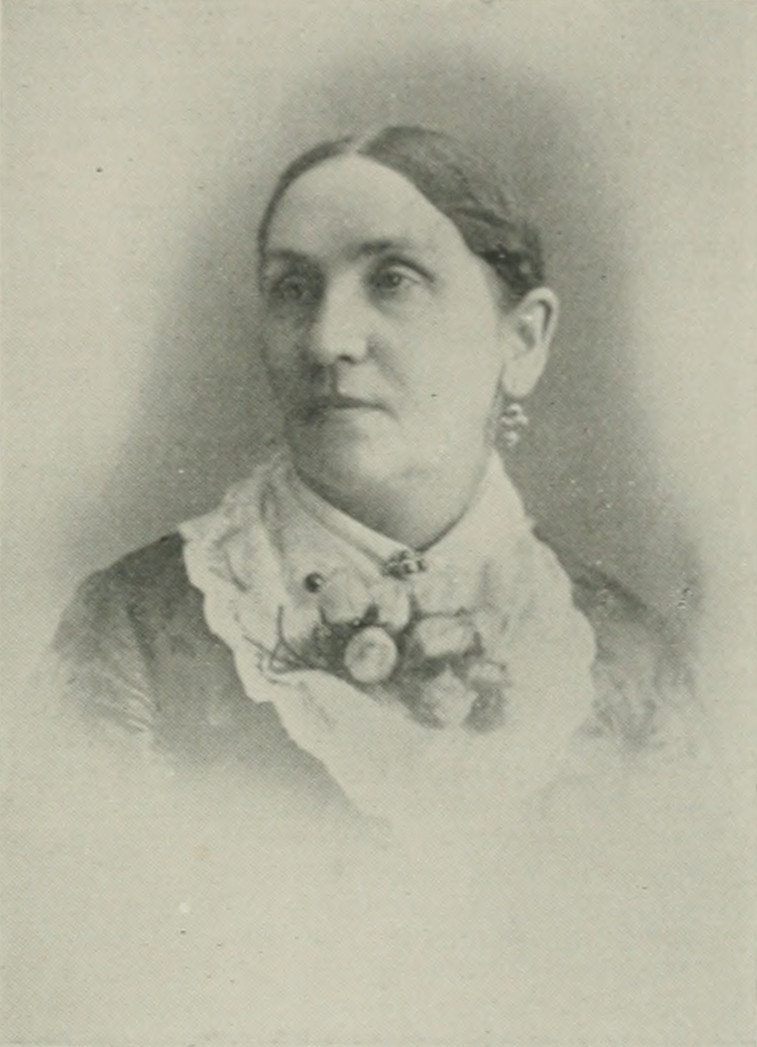
Portrait of Gordon from A Woman of the Century

Sarah Anna Gordon (née Steele; January 10, 1831 – before 1900) was an American physician and author of Camping in Colorado with Suggestions to Gold-Seekers, Tourists and Invalids (1879).

== Early life ==
Gordon was born in 1831 in Charlemont, Massachusetts, the daughter of Elijah Steele and his second wife, Emily.

When Gordon was young, her parents moved to New York, where she was reared and took the first year of a college course of study, which was afterwards completed in Illinois.

== Career ==
Before marriage, Gordon was in charge of the ladies' department at Rock River Seminary, and subsequently, the same position was twice tendered to her at Ripon College (Wisconsin). She was offered the position of principal of the newly formed State Normal School of Wisconsin. She attended teachers' institutes, wherever held throughout the State, for the purpose of agitating the subject of a normal school, until the desire became an object accomplished.

In 1858, she married William Allen Gordon, M.D., of New York. After the Civil War, they moved to Hannibal, Missouri.

After her marriage, Gordon immediately commenced the study of medicine with her husband, attended a partial course of lectures, and was called upon by the people to assist him in an overburdening practice.

In 1859 and 1860 the Gordons were connected with the Smithsonian Institution, taking meteorological notes and making collections for the same.

Gordon filled an engagement of one year as associate editor on the Central Wisconsin, and then joined her husband in Louisville, Kentucky, where he was stationed most of the time during the Civil War.

In Louisville, Gordon gave considerable time to the study of art, the remaining time being devoted to the relief of the suffering soldiers around her. Situated near her husband's headquarters at one time was a camp of homeless southern refugees, overtaken by the smallpox. They could find no physician to serve them. Gordon's husband was prohibited both by want of time and the exposures it would bring to the soldiers. She learned of their pitiful condition and at once went to their relief and fought the scourge until it vanished.

Gordon served as hospital officer to her husband in different capacities as unavoidable circumstances created vacancies not readily supplied.

Gordon was a weekly contributor to the literary columns of the Louisville Sunday Journal during the war. She has been a member of the Dante Society of America since its organization, and in 1882 and 1883 was State editor for the Missouri Woman's Christian Temperance Union on the Chicago Signal.

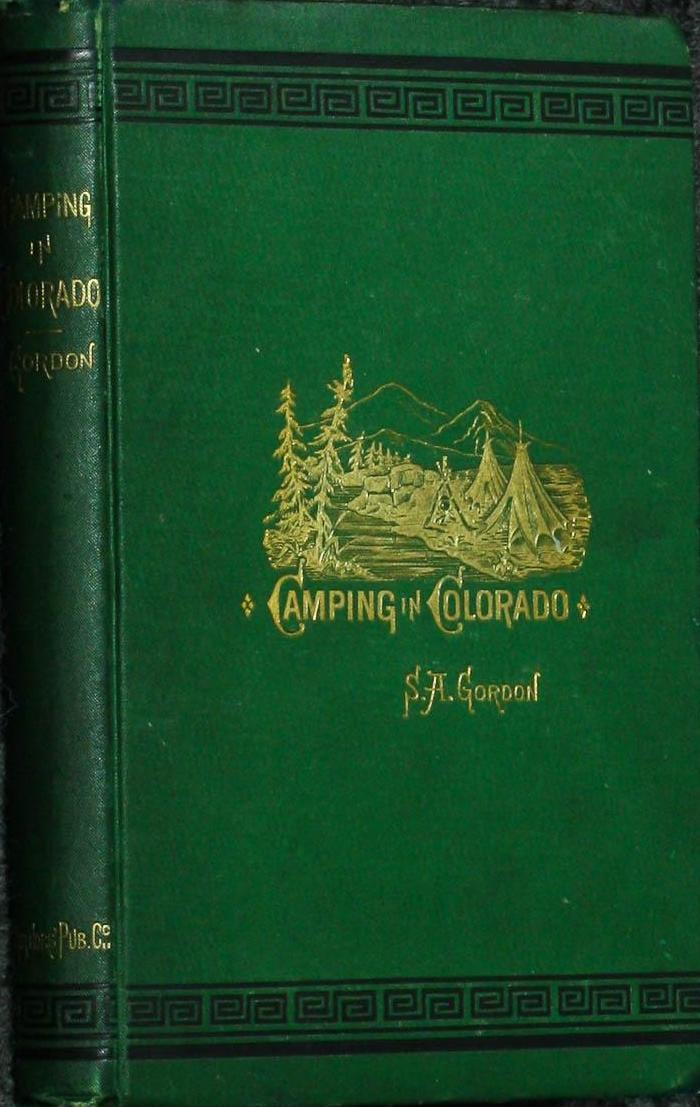
Camping In Colorado with Suggestions to Gold-Seekers, Tourists and Invalids

During a residence in Denver, Colorado, Gordon was the first person to suggest the demand for the newsboys' home there, which she had the opportunity to aid in establishing. She was also assistant superintendent of Chinese work in that city for some time.

Gordon was the author of: Music of Waters, Missing Gems, Pebbles, Camping in Colorado with Suggestions to Gold-Seekers, Tourists and Invalids (1879, The Author's Publishing Company, 1st edition, 1882, W B Smith & Co., New York, 2nd edition), and several papers and poems that have entered into other collections. Camping in Colorado described her and her family's adventures as they camped in the Rocky Mountains near Denver: "At the gates of the park we discovered an open cabin. It was built of unhewn logs, and covered with earth. The windows were gone, and the paths that once led to it were overgrown with bramble. We learned that this had been the home of Mountain Jim, who, during his life, had been known as trapper, hunter, fishman, and more. The desolate cabin still serves as a monument to his memory; and it is pointed out to strangers, the thrilling of this strange life and tragic death are related; all of which have become historically associated with the park"—S. Anna Gordon.

In 1889, Gordon graduated with honors from the Hahnemann Medical College of Chicago. In medicine, she was a homeopathist.
