= University of Wisconsin System =

System of public universities in Wisconsin

- Other names: UW System; Universities of Wisconsin
- Type: Public university system
- Established: 1848; 178 years ago
- Endowment: $671.35 million (2025)
- President: Renée M. Wachter (Interim)
- Students: 160,782
- Undergraduates: 135,263
- Postgraduates: 25,519
- Location: Madison, Wisconsin, United States
- Campus: 13 comprehensive universities; 12 branch campuses
- Colors: (Navy blue and teal)
- Website: wisconsin.edu

The University of Wisconsin System (Note: Since 2023, the system has marketed itself as "Universities of Wisconsin", while leaving its legal name as University of Wisconsin System.) is a state public university system in the U.S. state of Wisconsin. It is one of the largest public higher-education systems in the country, enrolling more than 160,000 students each year and employing approximately 41,000 faculty and staff statewide. The system is headquartered in the state capital of Madison.

The University of Wisconsin System comprises two major doctoral research universities, eleven other comprehensive universities, and seven two-year branch campuses. Since 2018, the system has undergone significant restructuring and consolidation of its two-year programs in response to enrollment and budgetary shifts.

== History ==
The present-day University of Wisconsin System was created on October 11, 1971, by Chapter 100, Laws of 1971, which combined the former University of Wisconsin and Wisconsin State Universities systems into an enlarged University of Wisconsin System. The final legislation passed in May 1974, combining two chapters of the Wisconsin statutes. The merger took effect July 9, 1974.

=== Former University of Wisconsin ===
The University of Wisconsin was created by the state constitution in 1848, and held its first classes in Madison in 1849.

In 1956, pressed by the growing demand for a large public university that offered graduate programs in Milwaukee, Wisconsin's largest city, Wisconsin lawmakers merged Wisconsin State College of Milwaukee (WSCM) and the University of Wisconsin–Extension's Milwaukee division as the University of Wisconsin–Milwaukee. The new campus comprised the WSCM campus near the lakefront and the UW extension in downtown Milwaukee.

Starting in the 1940s, freshman-sophomore centers were opened across the state. In 1968, the Green Bay center was upgraded to a full-fledged four-year institution as the University of Wisconsin–Green Bay, while the Kenosha and Racine centers were merged as the University of Wisconsin–Parkside. By 1971, the University of Wisconsin system had campuses at Madison, Milwaukee, Green Bay and Kenosha/Somers, together with 10 freshman-sophomore centers and the statewide University of Wisconsin–Extension. The total enrollment of the University of Wisconsin system at that time was 69,554. The Board of Regents of the University of Wisconsin system comprise ten members, nine of whom were appointed by the governor and confirmed by the senate for nine-year terms. The tenth was the State Superintendent of Public Instruction, who served ex officio on both the University of Wisconsin and Wisconsin State University boards.

=== Former Wisconsin State Universities ===
In 1866, the state legislature established a normal school at Platteville—the first of eight teacher-training schools across the state. In 1911, the legislature permitted the normal schools to offer two years of post-high school work in art, liberal arts and sciences, pre-law, and pre-medicine. The broadened curriculum proved popular and soon accounted for over one-third of the normal schools' enrollment. In 1920, the Carnegie Foundation for the Advancement of Teaching issued a report on "The Professional Education of Teachers of American Public Schools", which attacked such programs, arguing that normal schools should not deviate from their purpose as trainers of teachers. When the Milwaukee Normal School (MNS) persisted with its popular enhanced curriculum, the regents of the Normal School system, the legislature, and the governor all became involved. MNS President Carroll G. Pearse was forced to resign in 1923, and the regents ordered the discontinuation of non-teacher-education programs. The issue was not settled, though; public pressure for expanded offerings at normal schools continued to grow, and education professionals asserted that traditional two-year curricula in teacher training were inadequate.

In 1926, the regents repurposed the Normal Schools as "State Teachers Colleges", offering a four-year course of study leading to a Bachelor of Education degree that incorporated significant general education at all levels. The thousands of returning World War II veterans in Wisconsin needed more college choices for their studies under the G.I. Bill, and popular demand pushed the State Teachers College system Regents to once again allow the teacher training institutions to offer bachelor's degrees in liberal arts and fine arts. In 1951 the state teachers colleges were redesignated as "Wisconsin State Colleges," offering a full four-year liberal arts curriculum. In 1955, the Stout Institute in Menomonie, which had been founded as a private engineering school in 1891 and was sold to the state in 1911, was merged into the Wisconsin State Colleges system; it had previously been governed by a separate state board of regents.

The state colleges were all granted university status as "Wisconsin State Universities" in 1964 (with the exception of Wisconsin State College-Milwaukee, which had become part of the University of Wisconsin in 1956).

As of 1971, the Wisconsin State Universities comprised nine public universities (Platteville, Whitewater, Oshkosh, River Falls, Stout (in Menomonie), Superior, Stevens Point, La Crosse, and Eau Claire) and four freshman-sophomore branch campuses, with a total enrollment of 64,148. The board was made up of 14 members, 13 of whom were appointed by the governor and confirmed by the senate for five-year terms. The 14th was the State Superintendent of Public Instruction.

=== Merger ===
The University of Wisconsin system merged with the Wisconsin State University system in 1971 to create today's University of Wisconsin System. The 1971 merger law approved by the State Senate combined the two higher education systems in Wisconsin under a single Board of Regents, creating a system with 13 universities, 14 freshman-sophomore centers (as University of Wisconsin Colleges), and a statewide extension with offices in all 72 counties. Each university is named "University of Wisconsin–" followed by the location or name. Each two-year college was named "University of Wisconsin–" followed by the city and/or county in which it is located. The move, intended to enhance the University of Wisconsin's prestige and influence, was resisted by some parties concerned with a possible brand dilution.

The Board of the University of Wisconsin System includes 18 members, 16 of whom are appointed by the Governor and approved by the Senate. Of these 16 members, 14 serve staggered, seven-year terms. The remaining two are two-year positions filled by current University of Wisconsin System students. The two ex officio members are the State Superintendent of Public Instruction and the president or a designee of the Wisconsin Technical College System Board.

=== 2018 restructuring ===
In October 2017, University of Wisconsin System president Ray Cross publicly proposed restructuring the University of Wisconsin System to bring the UW Colleges under the control of their nearest comprehensive university, creating regional two-year campuses within the system. The proposal also included splitting UW–Extension between University of Wisconsin–Madison and University of Wisconsin System administration. University of Wisconsin Colleges Online, which was operating as an additional campus of University of Wisconsin Colleges, would be relocated under University of Wisconsin System administration. Cross announced this proposal without consulting shared governance groups or administrators. System administration argued that the merger would save money.

Critics said the merger was being rushed without input from the campuses and that the system was buckling to political pressure from the state. The proposal was approved by the University of Wisconsin Board of Regents in their November 2017 meeting, and implementation began July 1, 2018.

=== 2023–present: Branch campus closures ===
In 2023, University of Wisconsin–Platteville Richland shut down, marking the first time a University of Wisconsin campus has closed since University of Wisconsin–Medford in 1981. Following this closure, as of September 2026 six other two-year branch campuses have closed. Additionally, one campus has gone entirely online and another has stopped using several of its campus buildings. Many have expressed concerns about the future of the Wisconsin Idea following these closures.

== Campuses ==
=== Main campuses ===
Main campuses
1 Madison
2 Milwaukee
3 Oshkosh
4 Whitewater
5 La Crosse
6 Eau Claire
7 Green Bay
8 Stevens Point
9 Stout Polytechnic
10 Platteville
11 River Falls
12 Parkside
13 Superior

Campus	Founded	Enrollment (Fall 2024)	Endowment (2021–22) (millions)	Athletic affiliation	Athletic nickname (Conference)	U.S. News Rank (Midwest 2026)	Carnegie Classification
Madison	1848	51,791	$4,000.0	NCAA D-I (FBS)	Badgers (Big Ten)	36 (national)	R1: Doctoral Universities; Very high research activity
Milwaukee	1956	22,683	$262.0	NCAA D-I (non-football)	Panthers (Horizon)	301 (national)	R1: Doctoral Universities; Very high research activity
Oshkosh	1871	12,964	$22.0	NCAA D-III	Titans (WIAC)	352 (national)	Doctoral Universities; Doctoral/Professional Universities
Whitewater	1868	11,752		NCAA D-III	Warhawks (WIAC)	31	Master's Universities; Larger Programs
Green Bay	1965	11,188		NCAA D-I (non-football)	Phoenix (Horizon)	74	Master's Universities; Medium Programs
La Crosse	1909	10,458	$45.9	NCAA D-III	Eagles (WIAC)	14	Master's Universities; Larger Programs
Eau Claire	1916	10,000	$80.5	NCAA D-III	Blugolds (WIAC)	25	Master's Universities; Medium Programs
Stevens Point	1894	8,251		NCAA D-III	Pointers (WIAC)	54	Master's Universities; Medium Programs
Stout Polytechnic (Menomonie)	1891	6,914	$64.5	NCAA D-III	Blue Devils (WIAC)	84	Master's Universities; Larger Programs
Platteville	1866	6,391		NCAA D-III	Pioneers (WIAC)	49	Master's Universities; Larger Programs
River Falls	1874	5,273		NCAA D-III	Falcons (WIAC)	54	Master's Universities; Medium Programs
Parkside (Kenosha)	1968	3,948	$5.6	NCAA D-II	Rangers (GLIAC)	118	Master's Universities; Medium Programs
Superior	1893	2,823		NCAA D-III	Yellowjackets (UMAC)	135	Master's Universities; Medium Programs

=== Branch campuses ===
Branch campuses
- Former campus
- Open, without original facilities
1 Eau Claire – Barron County
2 Oshkosh, Fond du Lac Campus (2024)
3 Oshkosh, Fox Cities Campus (2025)
4 Green Bay, Manitowoc Campus
5 Green Bay, Marinette Campus (2024)
6 Green Bay, Sheboygan Campus
7 Milwaukee at Washington County (2024)
8 Milwaukee at Waukesha (2025)
9 Platteville Baraboo Sauk County (2026)
10 Platteville Richland (2023)
11 Stevens Point at Wausau (2026)
12 Stevens Point at Marshfield
13 Whitewater at Rock County
14 UW–Medford (1981)

==== Current ====
Campus	Parent campus	Founded	Enrollment (Fall 2024)	Athletic nickname (Conference)
Rock County (Janesville)	Whitewater	1966	710	Rattlers (NJCAA)
Barron County (Rice Lake)	Eau Claire	1966	535	Blugolds
Manitowoc	Green Bay	1933	488	Blue Devils
Sheboygan	Green Bay	1933	439	Wombats
Wausau	Stevens Point	1933	265	Huskies
Marshfield	Stevens Point	1963	156	Marauders (WCSL)

==== Former ====
Campus	Parent campus	Founded	Closed	Final enrollment	Nickname
Baraboo Sauk County	Platteville	1968	2026	178	Fighting Spirits (WCSL)
Fox Cities (Menasha)	Oshkosh	1933	2025	424	Cyclones (WCC)
Marinette	Green Bay	1935	2025	213	Buccaneers
Waukesha	Milwaukee	1966	2025	589	Panthers
Richland (Richland Center)	Platteville	1967	2023	60	Roadrunners
Fond du Lac	Oshkosh	1968	2024	252	Falcons (WCC)
Washington County (West Bend)	Milwaukee	1968	2024	285	Wildcats
Medford	Stevens Point	1968	1981	90	(WCC)

== Branding ==
Since the 1971 union of the universities and colleges under the University of Wisconsin System name, there has been a controversy over the arrangement. The name "University of Wisconsin" is often used to refer to the Madison campus, which has made it difficult for other institutions to make names for themselves. Conversely, many who are connected to UW–Madison have claimed that having so many institutions share the "University of Wisconsin" title has caused a form of brand dilution.

In 2006 and 2009, the students at UW–Milwaukee (UWM) voted on whether the school should change its name to something that did not carry the UW name (such as Wisconsin State University or University of Milwaukee). In both cases, a plurality of students voted to retain the name "University of Wisconsin–Milwaukee," but over 50% were in favor of a different name. Since 2004, the UWM athletic department has simply referred to the school's athletic teams as the Milwaukee Panthers. UW–Green Bay has since done the same and are officially the Green Bay Phoenix. Most other UW system programs are commonly referred to by just the city name as they all play in the same conference, the Wisconsin Intercollegiate Athletic Conference (WIAC), making the "UW" redundant. The exceptions are UW–Parkside, who plays in the Division II Great Lakes Intercollegiate Athletic Conference and is most often referred to as simply "Parkside", and UW-Superior, who plays most athletics in the Upper Midwest Athletic Conference, who go by UWS or Wisconsin–Superior.

In October 2023, system president Jay Rothman announced that the system would be rebranded as "Universities of Wisconsin", adopting a new logo and color scheme. The legal name of the system would remain unchanged.

== Presidents ==
The following people have served as president of the University of Wisconsin System:

No.	President	Term start	Term end	Refs.
1	John C. Weaver	October 12, 1971	June 30, 1977	
2	H. Edwin Young	July 1, 1977	January 31, 1980	
3	Robert M. O’Neil	February 1, 1980	August 31, 1985	
acting	Katharine C. Lyall	September 1, 1985	January 31, 1986	
4	Kenneth A. Shaw	February 1, 1986	July 31, 1991	
acting	Katharine C. Lyall	August 31, 1991	March 31, 1992	
5	Katharine C. Lyall	April 1, 1992	August 31, 2004	
6	Kevin P. Reilly	September 1, 2004	December 31, 2013	
interim	Richard J. Telfer	January 1, 2014	February 14, 2014	
7	Raymond W. Cross	February 15, 2014	June 30, 2020	
interim	Tommy G. Thompson	July 1, 2020	February 11, 2022	
8	Tommy G. Thompson	February 11, 2022	March 18, 2022	
interim	Michael J. Falbo	March 19, 2022	May 31 2022	
9	Jay O. Rothman	June 1, 2022	April 7, 2026	
acting executive- in-charge	Chris Patton	April 7, 2026	May 17, 2026	
interim	Renée M. Wachter	May 18, 2026	Present	

== See also ==
- List of state and territorial universities in the United States
- University of Wisconsin Credit Union
- Wisconsin Technical College System
