= Russ Rebholz =

American football player (1908–2002)

Biographical details
- Born: September 11, 1908; Portage, Wisconsin, U.S.
- Died: August 1, 2002 (aged 93); Portage, Wisconsin, U.S.

Playing career
- 1932: Winnipeg St. John's Rugby Club
- 1933–1938: Winnipeg Blue Bombers
- Position: Halfback

Coaching career (HC unless noted)
- 1932: Winnipeg St. John's Rugby Club
- 1933–1938: Winnipeg Blue Bombers
- 1952–1963: Milwaukee

Accomplishments and honors

Championships
- Football; Grey Cup (1935) Basketball; WIAC (1960)

Russell "Doss" Rebholz (September 11, 1908 – August 1, 2002) was a professional football player for the Winnipeg Blue Bombers and later a high school and college football and basketball coach.

== College ==
A native of Portage, Wisconsin, Rebholz was a letter winner in football from 1929 to 1931 and in basketball from 1930 to 1931 at the University of Wisconsin. In 1930, he led the Midwest, Big Ten, and UW in scoring, with 48 points. Rebholz played in the 1932 East-West Shrine Game.

== Professional football ==
In 1932, Rebholz played for and coached the Salamander Water Polo Club In Japan. From 1933 to 1938, he was a player/coach for the Winnipeg Blue Bombers football team, which won the 1935 Grey Cup. Nicknamed "The Wisconsin Wraith" while with the Blue Bombers, he wore jersey number 66.

Rebholz was one of the first two football imports to arrive in Canada from the United States. A versatile halfback, he was known for his passing, running, blocking, and kicking abilities. In a 1934 exhibition game, he threw one of the longest passes ever, 68 yards in the air, to Lynn Patrick for a touchdown. In the 1935 Grey Cup game, he threw two touchdown passes and led the Blue Bombers to a Dominion Championship over the favored Hamilton Tigers from the East.

He was elected a charter member of the Canadian Football Hall of Fame on November 27, 1963, and the Winnipeg Blue Bomber Hall of Fame in 1984.

== Coaching career ==
During his coaching career, Rebholz served at Stevens Point, Racine Horlick High School and the University of Wisconsin–Milwaukee in a variety of positions, earning six Coach of the Year honors.

While at Horlick High School, he led the team to a winning season in men's basketball. The community started calling the team Rebholz's Rebels for their style of play, and the nickname stuck. Rebels is now one of the two official nicknames for the school's athletic teams.

Between 1952 and 1963, Rebholz compiled a .539 winning percentage (123-105) while coaching the University of Wisconsin–Milwaukee men's basketball team. He was 58-42 in his first 100 games as the coach at UW–Milwaukee, which is second best in the school's history, behind former Tennessee Volunteers coach Bruce Pearl, who was 66-34 in his first 100 games at the university. In the 1959-1960 season, the team went 18-4 overall and 10-2 in the Wisconsin Intercollegiate Athletic Conference (WIAC) and were the NCAA College Division Regional Third Place team. It was the first time the school had made it to the post-season. They lost to Lincoln and beat Augustana College. The Panthers were nicknamed the Cardinals at the time.

In 2000, Rebholz was inducted into the University of Wisconsin/National W Club Hall of Fame.

Russ Rebholz
Profile
- Positions: Running back, Guard, Flying wing

Personal information
- Born: September 11, 1908; Portage, Wisconsin
- Died: August 1, 2002 (aged 93); Portage, Wisconsin

Career information
- College: University of Wisconsin

Career history
- 1933–1938: Winnipeg 'Pegs/Blue Bombers

Awards and highlights
- 23rd Grey Cup Championship
- Canadian Football Hall of Fame (Class of 1963)

== Head coaching record ==
=== Basketball ===
Record table
Season	Team	Overall	Conference	Standing	Postseason
Milwaukee State Green Gulls / Milwaukee Cardinals (Wisconsin State College Conference) (1952–1963)
1952–53	Milwaukee State	9–12	6–6		
1953–54	Milwaukee State	14–7	9–3		
1954–55	Milwaukee State	11–10	7–5		
1955–56	Milwaukee State	13–8	7–5		
1956–57	Milwaukee	12–7	7–5		
1957–58	Milwaukee	13–7	7–5		
1958–59	Milwaukee	17–4	11–2		
1959–60	Milwaukee	18–4	10–2	1st	NCAA College Division Regional Third Place
1960–61	Milwaukee	8–12	5–7		
1961–62	Milwaukee	4–17	3–9		
1962–63	Milwaukee	4–17	3–9		
Milwaukee State / Milwaukee:		123–105	75–58		
Total:		123–105			
National champion Postseason invitational champion Conference regular season champion Conference regular season and conference tournament champion Division regular season champion Division regular season and conference tournament champion Conference tournament champion
