= Guy Penwell =

American sports coach, athletic director (1901–1984)

Biographical details
- Born: December 1, 1901; Belgrade, Montana, U.S.
- Died: September 8, 1984 (aged 82); Spokane, Washington, U.S.

Playing career

Basketball
- 1923–1925: Idaho

Coaching career (HC unless noted)

Basketball
- 1927–1930: Minnesota (assistant)
- 1930–1942: Milwaukee
- 1946–1952: Milwaukee

Head coaching record
- Overall: 186–138 (basketball)

Accomplishments and honors

Championships
- Basketball; 4 WSTCC regular season (1934, 1940, 1941, 1948)

Guy Oscar Penwell (December 1, 1901 – September 8, 1984) was an American sports coach, primarily of basketball and track and field, and athletic director. He served as the head basketball coach at Milwaukee State Teachers College—now known as the University of Wisconsin–Milwaukee from 1930 to 1942 and again from 1946 to 1952. Penwell previously served as an assistant basketball coach at the University of Minnesota under Dave MacMillan.

Penwell was born on December 1, 1901, in Belgrade, Montana, and moved to Moscow, Idaho with his family as a child. He attended the University of Idaho, where he earned nine varsity letters, in basketball, cross country, and track. He graduated from Idaho with a bachelor's degree in physical education and a doctorate in law. Penwell was also the head coach of track, cross country, golf, and tennis at Milwaukee. During World War II, he served as a lieutenant colonel in the United States Army, and was the athletic director for the European Theater of Operations (ETO). After retiring from Milwaukee in 1959, he moved to Spokane, Washington, where he worked as a regional credit supervisor. He died of cancer, on September 8, 1984, at his home in Spokane.

== Head coaching record ==
=== Basketball ===
Record table
Season	Team	Overall	Conference	Standing	Postseason
Milwaukee Green Gulls (Wisconsin State Teachers College Conference) (1931–1942)
1930–31	Milwaukee	8–7			
1931–32	Milwaukee	4–13			
1932–33	Milwaukee	9–8			
1933–34	Milwaukee	13–4		T–1st	
1934–35	Milwaukee	9–6	5–3		
1935–36	Milwaukee	12–5	6–2		
1936–37	Milwaukee	7–9	3–5		
1937–38	Milwaukee	11–5	5–3		
1938–39	Milwaukee	9–7	5–3		
1939–40	Milwaukee	12–4	7–1	1st	
1940–41	Milwaukee	16–0	8–0	1st	
1941–42	Milwaukee	11–5	6–2		
Milwaukee Green Gulls (Wisconsin State Teachers College Conference / Wisconsin State College Conference) (1946–1952)
1946–47	Milwaukee	11–8	6–2		
1947–48	Milwaukee	13–8	5–3 (South)	T–1st	
1948–49	Milwaukee	10–12	5–7		
1949–50	Milwaukee	20–7	9–4		
1950–51	Milwaukee	6–15	3–9		
1951–52	Milwaukee	5–15	3–9		
Milwaukee:		186–138			
Total:		186–138			
National champion Postseason invitational champion Conference regular season champion Conference regular season and conference tournament champion Division regular season champion Division regular season and conference tournament champion Conference tournament champion
