= University of Wisconsin–Extension =

Defunct arm of the University of Wisconsin System

The University of Wisconsin–Extension (UW–Extension) was the outreach arm of the University of Wisconsin System. It provided statewide access to university system's resources and research to Wisconsin residents of all ages. Fulfilling the promise of the Wisconsin Idea, UW–Extension extended the boundaries of the university to the boundaries of the state through its four divisions of Cooperative Extension, Continuing and Online Education, Business and Entrepreneurship, and Public Broadcasting. It was created as a division of UW–Madison in 1907, and took its new form in 1965 as an autonomous unit. The abolition of UW–Extension as a separate entity was begun July 1, 2018.

== Organization ==
With offices in all 72 Wisconsin counties, on four UW campuses, and in three tribal nations, the Wisconsin Cooperative Extension Division worked with local, state, and federal partners to provide educational programs in six areas: Agriculture and Natural Resources; Community, Natural Resources and Economic Development]; Family Living; 4-H Youth Development; Wisconsin Geological and Natural History Survey; and Leadership Wisconsin.

The Division of Continuing and Online Education, offered credit, noncredit, professional development, and personal enrichment programs through the 26 UW System campuses and online courses and programs throughout the world. The online Bachelor of Science degree in sustainable management was added in 2009 in partnership with UW–Parkside, UW–River Falls, UW–Stout, and UW–Superior.

The Division of Business and Entrepreneurship was a UW–Extension business resource group organized as a collection of affiliated yet independent business support centers and initiatives. The educational, consulting, and research services focus on improving the overall quality of Wisconsin business startups and developing high-potential companies.

The Division of Public Broadcasting was responsible for Wisconsin Public Radio and Wisconsin Public Television, in cooperation with the Wisconsin Educational Communications Board, and provides interactive audio, video, and digital media for education and communications.

On November 9, 2017, the UW Board of Regents voted to proceed with a proposal that splits UW–Extension's divisions between UW–Madison and the University of Wisconsin System administration. The Cooperative Extension Division and the Conference Centers is becoming part of UW–Madison, while the system administration are taking over the Division of Business and Entrepreneurship, Division of Public Broadcasting, and Division of Continuing and Online Education.

== See also ==
- PBS Wisconsin
- University of Wisconsin Sustainable Management
- Wisconsin Public Radio
