= Eric Hinske =

American baseball player (born 1977)

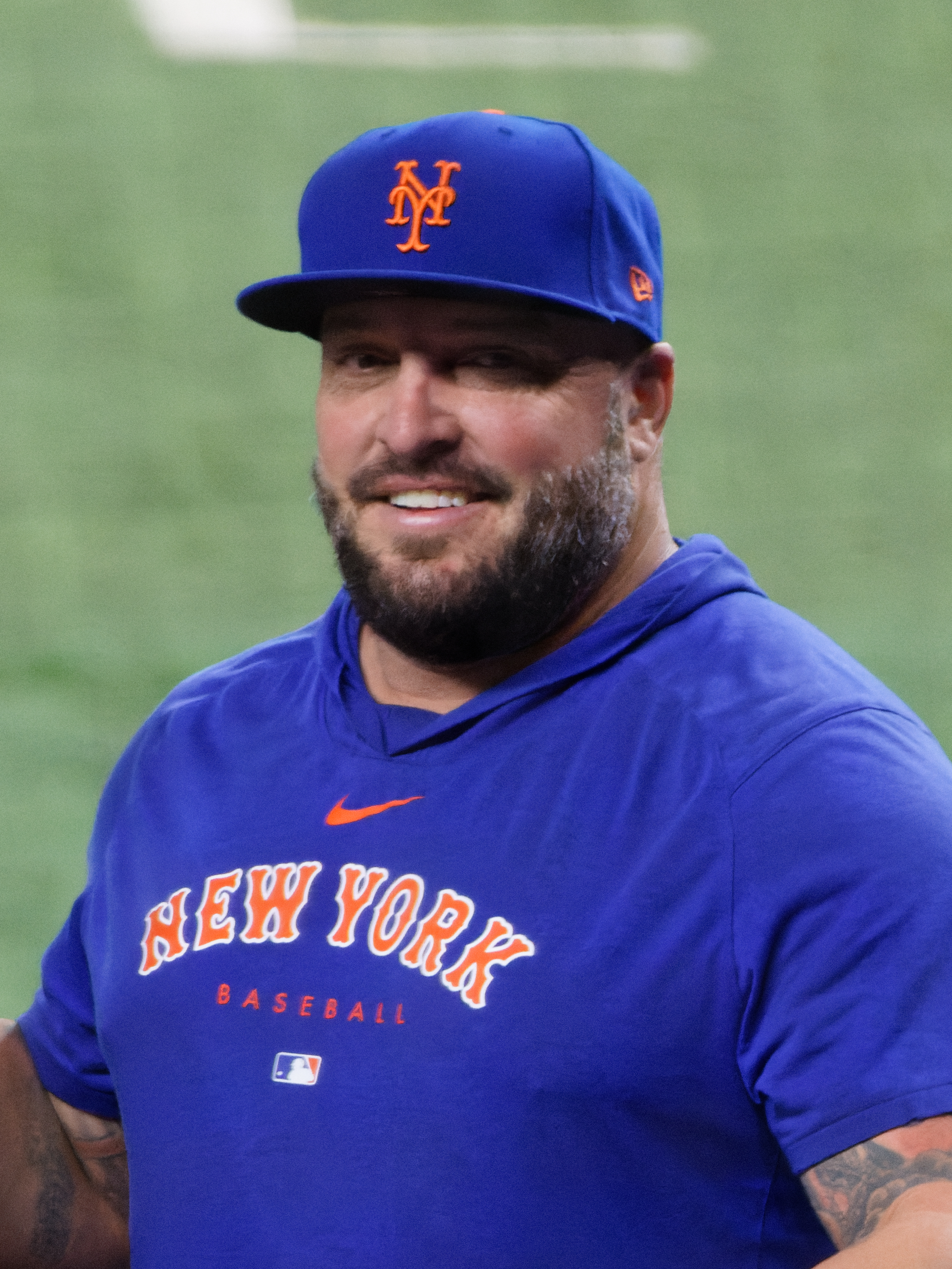
- Hinske with the Mets in 2023
- Third baseman / Outfielder / First baseman
- Born: August 5, 1977 (age 49); Menasha, Wisconsin, U.S.
- Batted: Left Threw: Right

MLB debut
- April 1, 2002, for the Toronto Blue Jays

Last MLB appearance
- June 27, 2013, for the Arizona Diamondbacks

MLB statistics
- Batting average: .249
- Home runs: 137
- Runs batted in: 522
- Stats at Baseball Reference

Teams
- As player: Toronto Blue Jays (2002–2006); Boston Red Sox (2006–2007); Tampa Bay Rays (2008); Pittsburgh Pirates (2009); New York Yankees (2009); Atlanta Braves (2010–2012); Arizona Diamondbacks (2013); As coach: Chicago Cubs (2014–2017); Los Angeles Angels (2018); Arizona Diamondbacks (2019–2021); New York Mets (2023)

Career highlights and awards
- 3× World Series champion (2007, 2009, 2016); AL Rookie of the Year (2002)

Eric Scott Hinske (born August 5, 1977) is an American professional baseball coach and former outfielder and first baseman. Hinske played in the major leagues from 2002 to 2013 with the Toronto Blue Jays, Boston Red Sox, Tampa Bay Rays, Pittsburgh Pirates, New York Yankees, Atlanta Braves and Arizona Diamondbacks at third base, first base, left field, and right field. He won the 2002 AL Rookie of the Year Award with the Blue Jays. He has also been a coach for the Chicago Cubs and Los Angeles Angels.

== Amateur career ==
Born in Menasha, Wisconsin, Hinske played for Menasha High School where he broke many hitting records, in addition to playing football as a running back. He initially intended to play football and baseball at the University of Wisconsin–Oshkosh, which was 15 minutes from his home.

The University of Arkansas ultimately offered him a full scholarship to play baseball. Between 1996 and 1998, he hit .345 during his time at Arkansas. He also ranked within the top 10 in school history for several offensive categories, including RBI, runs scored, and extra base hits. In 1997, Hinske set a school record with 87 runs scored.

In 1997, he played collegiate summer baseball for the Hyannis Mets of the Cape Cod Baseball League.

== Professional career ==
=== Chicago Cubs ===
The Chicago Cubs selected Hinske in the 17th round of the 1998 amateur draft. He began his professional career in Short Season A-ball with the Williamsport Cubs of the New York-Penn League. After hitting .298 with nine home runs and 57 RBI over 68 games, he moved over to the Rockford Cubbies of the Midwest League.

Hinske spent most of the 1999 season in High-A with the Daytona Cubs of the Florida State League. He had an All-Star year, hitting .259 with 20 home runs and 73 RBI in 131 games. In 2000, Hinske played for the West Tennessee Diamond Jaxx in Double-A. He hit .259 with 20 home runs and 73 RBI in 131 games for the Southern League champions.

=== Oakland Athletics ===
The Oakland Athletics acquired Hinske from the Cubs for Miguel Cairo on March 28, 2001. Hinske was assigned to Triple-A Sacramento for the 2001 season. He hit .282 with 25 home runs, 20 stolen bases, and 79 RBI in 121 for the River Cats.

=== Toronto Blue Jays ===
On December 7, 2001, Toronto Blue Jays general manager J. P. Ricciardi acquired Hinske and reliever Justin Miller from the Athletics for Billy Koch, a move designed to bring youth and vitality to the team.

Hinske was inserted in the everyday lineup in 2002, playing third base. While criticized early for his defense, he made up for it with his bat, hitting .279 with 24 home runs, 13 stolen bases, and 84 RBI. He is one of three rookies in Blue Jays history to hit 21 or more home runs, along with J. P. Arencibia (23 in 2011) and Rowdy Tellez (21 in 2019). He also led all AL third basemen in errors, with 22. Hinske won the MLB Rookie of the Year and The Sporting News Rookie of the Year awards.

Following Hinske's successful 2002 campaign, the Blue Jays signed him to a five-year, $14.75 million contract in March 2003. He struggled during the first two months of the season, hitting just .230 with two home runs through May 23. Hinske was finally diagnosed with a broken hamate bone in his right hand and underwent surgery, missing a month of playing time. As a result, he was unable to match his numbers of the previous year, finishing with an average of .243, 12 home runs and 63 RBI in 2003.

Hinske was still unable to return to his rookie form in 2004, finishing the year with a batting average of .246, with 15 home runs and 69 RBI. A positive note for Hinske was that he had committed a career-low seven errors at third base and led all third baseman in fielding percentage (.978). After the season, the Blue Jays were said to be looking to trade Hinske. Instead, the team ultimately acquired third basemen Corey Koskie and Shea Hillenbrand, and moved Hinske to first base. He started the 2005 season strong with a .290 batting average, six home runs, and 25 RBI through the end of May. However, he hit just .247 with nine home runs and 43 RBI the rest of the way.

Toronto acquired Lyle Overbay and Troy Glaus after the 2005 season, forcing Hinske to shift to the outfield. He began the 2006 season in a platoon with Alex Ríos in right field, before the latter won the job after a solid April. Hinske gained playing time when Rios was placed on the 15-day disabled list with a staph infection suffered after fouling a ball off his leg. Following the high-profile exit of Hillenbrand in July, Hinske gained even more opportunity to play.

=== Boston Red Sox ===
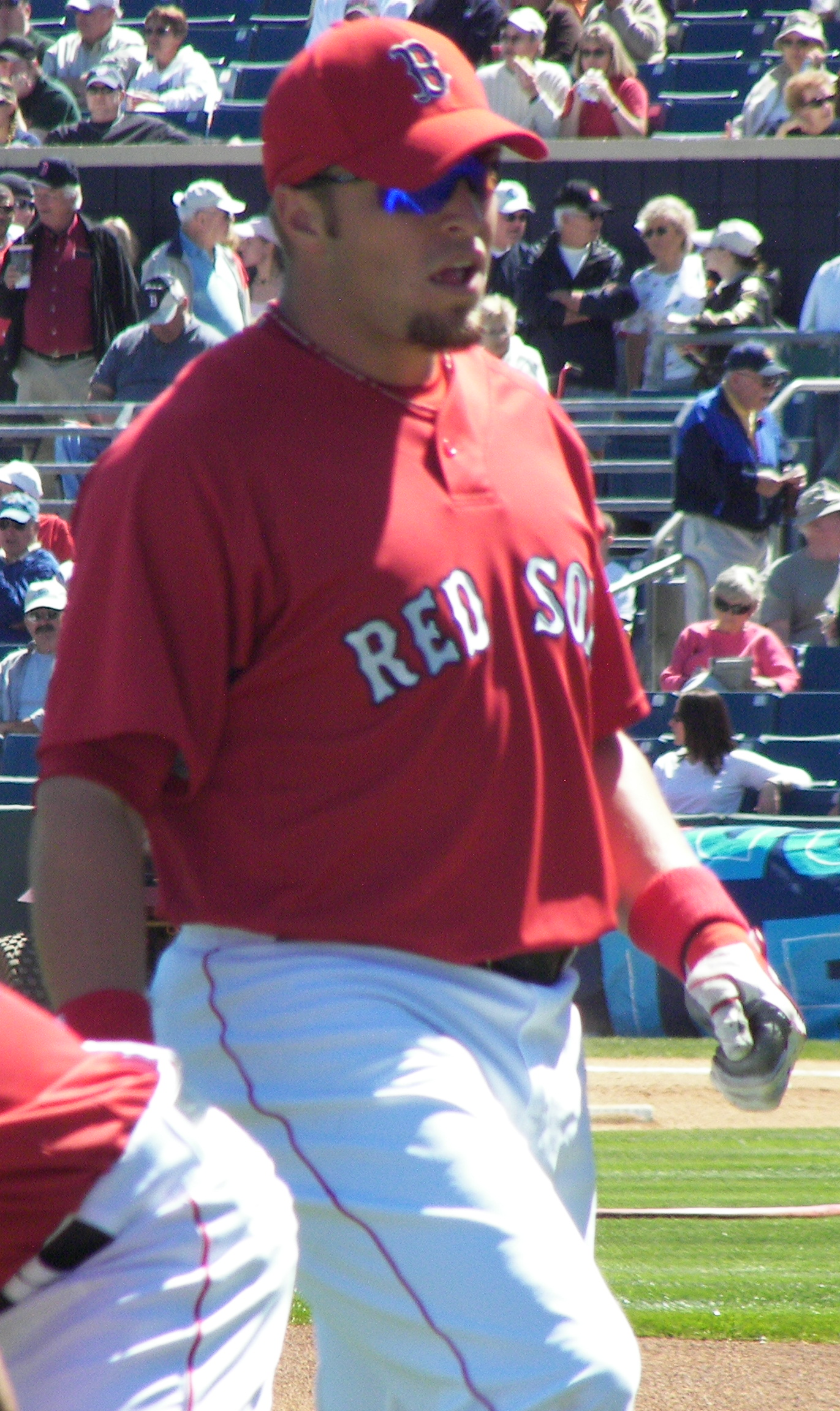
Hinske with the Boston Red Sox in 2007

On August 17, 2006, Hinske was traded to the Boston Red Sox for a minor league player to be named later and cash considerations. His versatility helped the Red Sox, since they were greatly plagued by injuries in the second half of the season. He played first base and both corner outfield positions, and hit .342 in the last month of the season.

On May 17, 2007, Hinske had what could be considered the highlight of his Red Sox career against the Detroit Tigers. In the 5th inning of the game, Mike Rabelo hit a fly ball that seemed destined to find a hole in right field. However, Hinske made a full-body diving catch, hitting the warning track face first. Later, in the bottom of the 7th inning, he would hit a go-ahead two-run home run. Hinske hit below his career norms with a .204 batting average and a .733 OPS in 84 games that year. He was included on the Red Sox playoff roster and received his first World Series ring with them.

=== Tampa Bay Rays ===
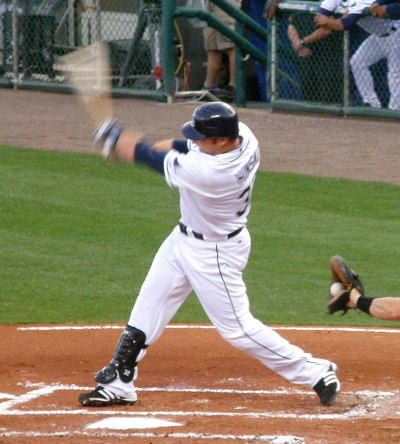
Hinske batting for the Tampa Bay Rays on April 24, 2008.

On February 6, 2008, Hinske signed a minor-league contract with an invitation to spring training with the Tampa Bay Rays. He was added to the 40-man major league roster on March 29, and was the Rays opening-day right-fielder. In his Rays debut, Hinske homered to right field off Baltimore starter Jeremy Guthrie.

On July 29, Hinske hit his 100th career home run off former Toronto Blue Jays teammate Roy Halladay. There was controversy as to whether or not it was an inside the park home run. It was later officially ruled a traditional home run, after it was thought to have hit an awning in center field. On the final day of the regular season, Hinske hit his 20th home run, drove in his 60th run, and stole his 10th base of the year. It was the first time he had hit twenty home runs since his rookie year of 2002, and the first time he had stolen ten bases or more since the 2004 season.

Hinske was on the team's initial playoff roster but did not play in the American League Division Series and was replaced by Edwin Jackson for the ALCS. Prior to Game 4 of the World Series, Hinske was added to the Rays' roster, replacing the injured Cliff Floyd. In the fifth inning of Game 4, Hinske hit an estimated 410-foot pinch-hit home run to center field off Philadelphia starter Joe Blanton. He made the final out of the World Series, striking out against Philadelphia Phillies closer Brad Lidge in Game 5.

=== Pittsburgh Pirates ===
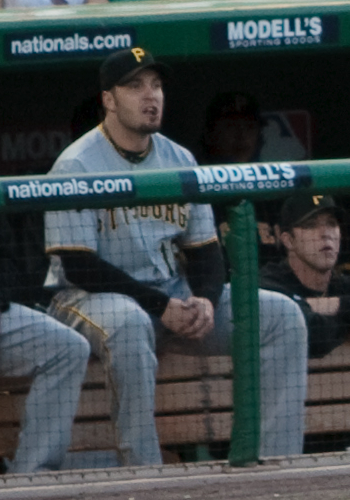
Hinske with the Pittsburgh Pirates in 2009

On January 30, 2009, Hinske signed a one-year deal with the Pittsburgh Pirates worth $1.5 million. He missed time in spring training after injuring his rib cage running into the outfield wall. Hinske played 54 games for the team, batting .255 with 11 RBI and 17 walks mostly off the bench.

=== New York Yankees ===
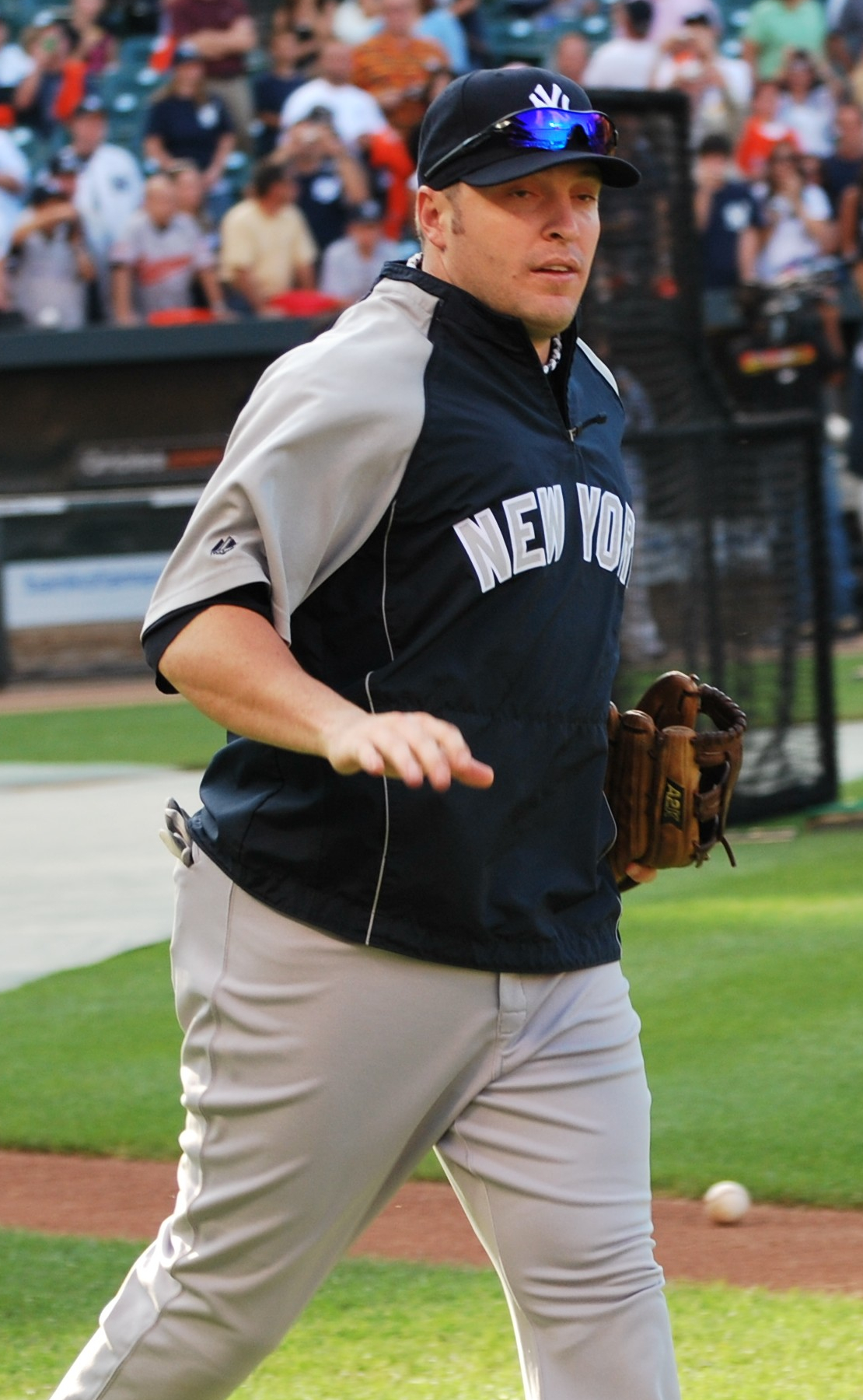
Hinske with the Yankees in 2009

On June 30, Hinske was traded from the Pirates to the New York Yankees in exchange for Eric Fryer and Casey Erickson. With New York he hit .226 with seven home runs in 84 at-bats over 39 games. Hinske was included in the Yankees' initial postseason roster for the first round of the 2009 American League Division Series. He was replaced by pinch runner Freddy Guzman for the 2009 American League Championship Series, but returned to the roster for the World Series. This marked his third straight World Series appearance with his third different team, all from the AL East. Additionally, the Yankees win gave him his second World Series ring.

=== Atlanta Braves ===
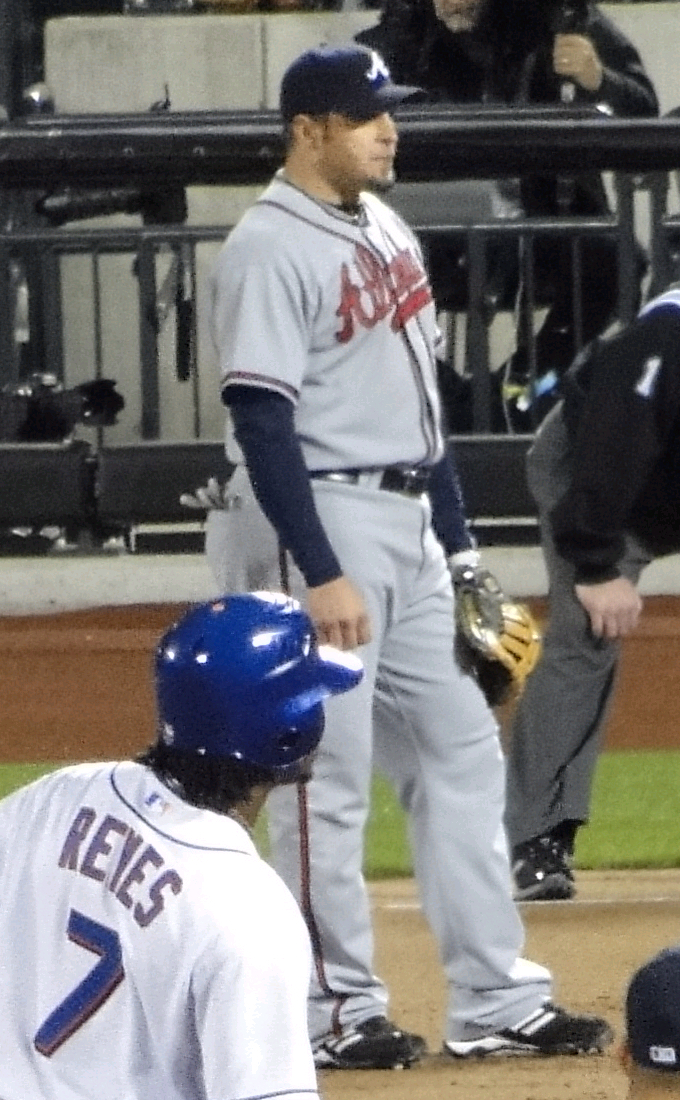
Hinske with the Atlanta Braves

On January 5, 2010, it was reported that Hinske signed a one-year deal worth $1.5 million with the Atlanta Braves. In his first Braves at-bat he hit a triple. He hit his first home run as a Brave on May 16. With the Braves fighting for the NL Wild Card spot over the last week of the season, Hinske delivered a clutch go-ahead, two-run home run against the Marlins on September 29. Over the season, he appeared in 131 games, hitting .256 with 11 home runs and 51 RBI. He hit three home runs and drove in 12 runs as a pinch-hitter.

He made it to the postseason for the fourth straight year and hit a dramatic go-ahead, pinch-hit, two-run home run in the eighth inning of Game 3 of the NLDS against the San Francisco Giants. However, the Braves ultimately lost the game and were eliminated in four games.

On December 2, the Braves re-signed Hinske to a one-year deal with an option for 2012. He was primarily used as a bat off the bench and played the corner outfield positions. On June 3, 2011, Hinske hit a go-ahead solo homer off Mets closer Francisco Rodriguez to help the Braves win 6–3 He hit .233 with 10 home runs and 28 RBI that year, hitting .310 with runners in scoring position and two outs.

The Braves picked up their option on Hinske for the 2012 season. On May 5, he went 4–4 against the Colorado Rockies, including a tie-breaking two-run homer in the 11th inning. On May 11, Hinske was ejected by umpire Mike Muchlinski after Muchlinski ruled that Hinske had not checked his swing and was out on strikes. He made just two starts after the All-Star break and hit .197 with two home runs and 13 RBI in 132 at-bats for the Braves that year.

=== Arizona Diamondbacks ===
On December 4, 2012, Hinske signed a one-year deal with the Arizona Diamondbacks. After passing a physical, the contract became official on December 6, 2012. Hinske was suspended for five games for his actions during a brawl between the Diamondbacks and the Los Angeles Dodgers on June 11, 2013. The suspension was later reduced to only one game. After hitting .173 with one home run and six RBI in 52 games, he was designated for assignment on June 28.

== Scouting and coaching ==
Following the 2013 season, Hinske was hired as a scout by the Yankees. He helped convince Brian McCann to sign with the team. After a month with the organization, he was hired by the Chicago Cubs to be their first base coach on December 3, 2013. After the 2014 season, the Yankees considered naming Hinske the team's next hitting coach. However, he ultimately stayed with Chicago and was named assistant hitting coach. In 2016, Hinske won his third World Series ring when the Cubs defeated the Indians in the 2016 World Series.

He was hired by the Los Angeles Angels on October 23, 2017, to be their hitting coach. After one season, he was replaced by Jeremy Reed. He was hired as the assistant hitting coach by the Arizona Diamondbacks in 2019. On June 10, 2021, Hinske and hitting coach Darnell Coles were relieved of their positions with the club.

On January 3, 2023, the New York Mets announced that Hinske was hired to be the team's assistant hitting coach for the 2023 season. He was not retained for the 2024 season following the hiring of Carlos Mendoza as Mets manager.

== Personal life ==
Hinske and wife Kathryn have three children, Ava, Dylan, and A.J. In 2016, Hinske's hometown Menasha honored his professional achievements by dedicating a street in his name.

Hinske enjoys listening to metal music, and his walk-up song was "Walk" by Pantera. Hinske has a large set of tattoos incorporating Japanese iconography that completely cover his back.

Awards and achievements
Preceded by Albert Pujols	Baseball America Rookie of the Year; 2002	Succeeded by Brandon Webb
Preceded by Ichiro Suzuki	Players Choice AL Most Outstanding Rookie; 2002	Succeeded by Ángel Berroa
Preceded by Albert Pujols	Topps Rookie All-Star Third Baseman; 2002	Succeeded by Ty Wigginton
Sporting positions
Preceded by Dave McKay	Chicago Cubs first base coach 2014	Succeeded by Brandon Hyde
Preceded by Mike Brumley	Chicago Cubs assistant hitting coach 2015–2017	Succeeded by Andy Haines
Preceded by Dave Hansen	Los Angeles Angels Hitting Coach; 2018	Succeeded by Jeremy Reed
