= Menasha High School =

Public secondary school in Menasha, Wisconsin

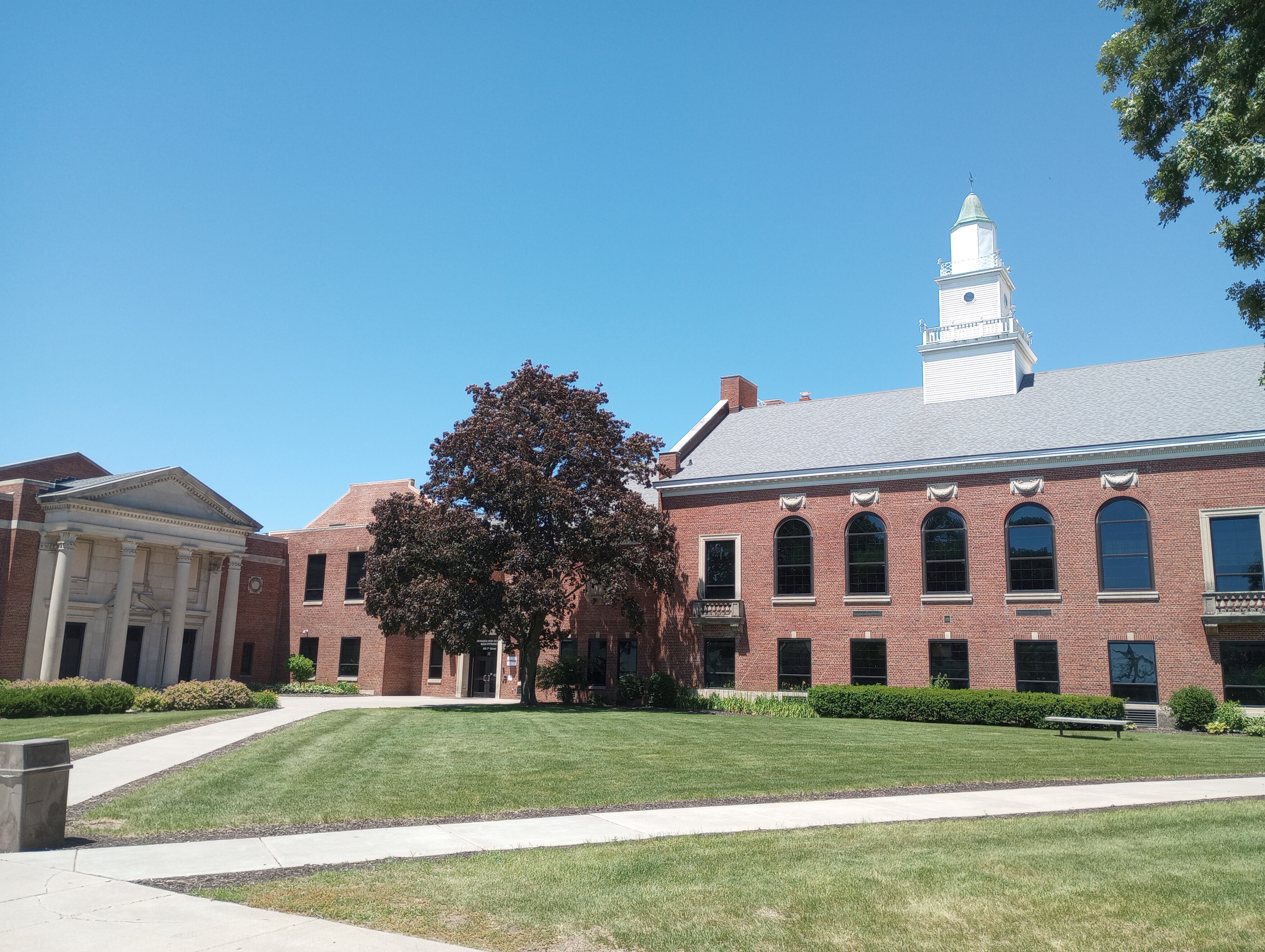
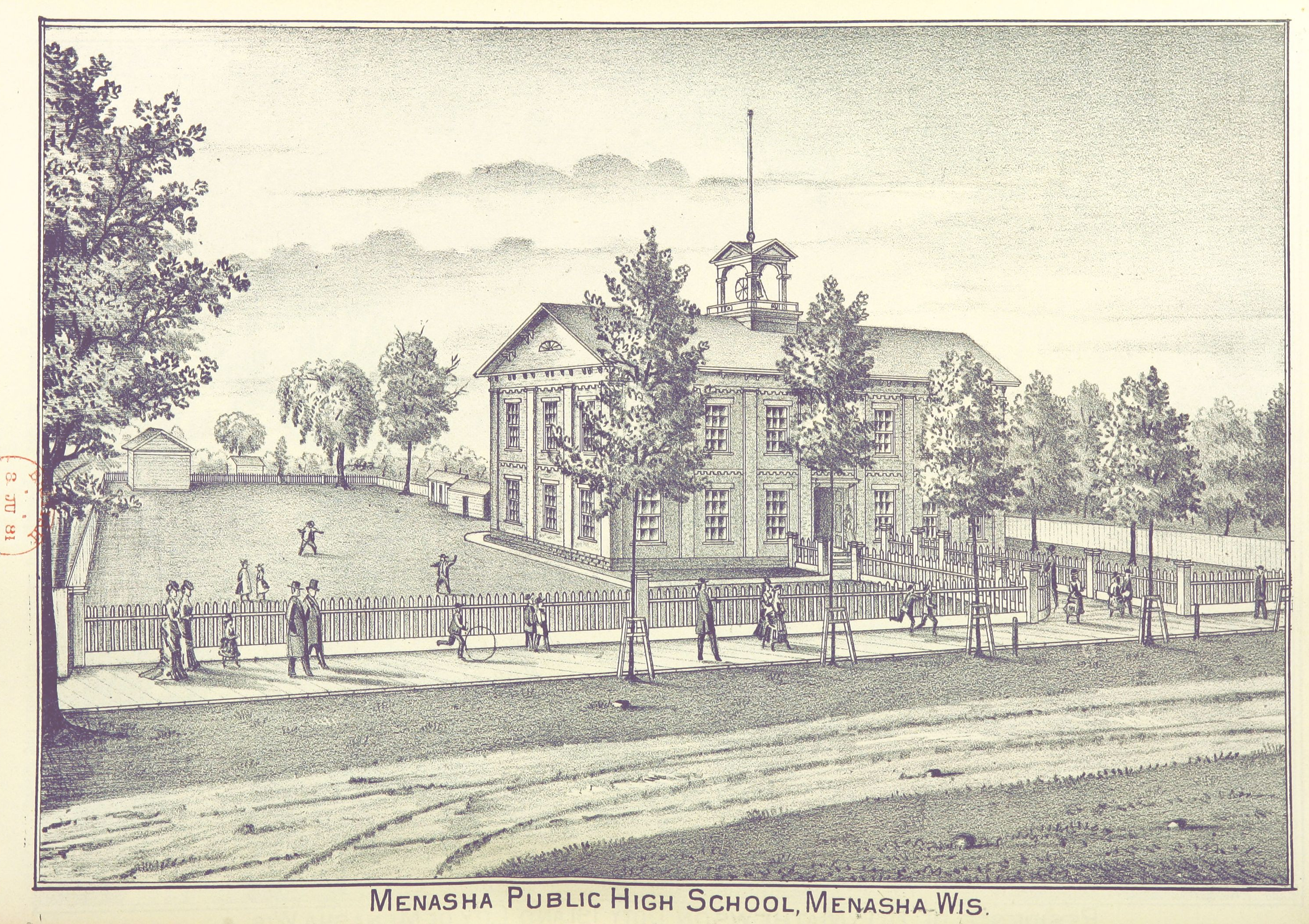
- Menasha High School The first Menasha High School

Location
- 420 7th St; Menasha, Wisconsin 54952; United States; 44°12′40″N 88°26′51″W

Information
- School type: Public high school
- Established: 1875
- School district: Menasha Joint School District
- Superintendent: Matthew Zimmerman
- Principal: Adam Baier
- Teaching staff: 66.06 (FTE)
- Grades: 9 through 12
- Enrollment: 1,017 (2023-2024)
- Student to teacher ratio: 15.40
- Color
- Athletics conference: Bay Conference
- Mascot: Blue Jay
- Rival: Neenah High School
- Yearbook: The Nicolet
- Website: www.mjsd.k12.wi.us/schools/high/

Menasha High School is a public high school located in Menasha, Wisconsin, United States, formally organized in 1875.

== History ==
The current Menasha High School was built between 1936 and 1938. It was completed in 1938 in a Colonial Revival style with Georgian influences, following the design by the Green Bay firm of Foeller, Schober, and Berners.

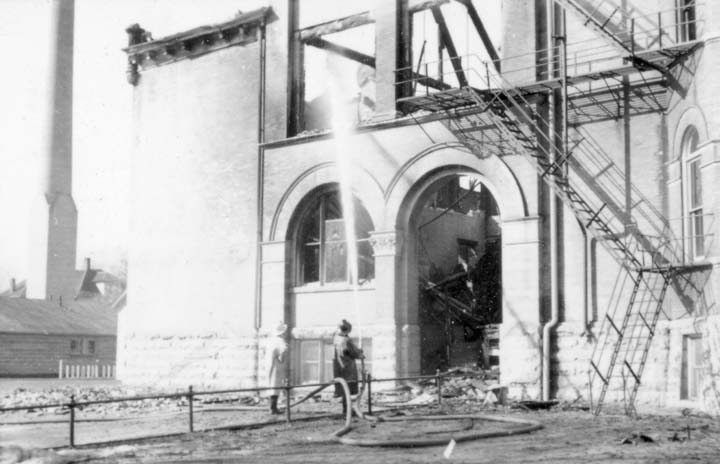
The Menasha High School fire on March 21, 1936

In 2014, at a cost of 30 million dollars, the outdated, undersized, and inflexible circa 1930s building underwent renovation and expansion. The architect/engineer of that project was Eppstein Uhen Architects. Great care was taken to preserve the historical features of the building.

Menasha High School previously occupied two other buildings. The first, built in 1871, was razed in 1896 to expand. The second building was built in 1896 and was completely destroyed by a fire on March 21, 1936.

== Athletics ==
Menasha's athletic teams are known as the Blue Jays, and compete in the Bay Conference. First playing in 1896, Menasha has a long-standing football rivalry with nearby Neenah High School.

In 2014, Menasha won their first WIAA Division 2 Football Championship by a score of 37–17 against Waukesha West. Their football program is currently Division 3.

Menasha's hockey program is split into two collaborations with other high schools in the area. The boys' collaboration is with Neenah, Hortonville, and Shiocton called the NHM Rockets. NHM participate in the Badgerland Conference and took 2nd place in the WIAA 2019 State Championship. The girls' collaboration is with the Fox Cities Stars, a program consisting of 17 high schools in the area. They won back-to-back WIAA Championships in 2019 and 2020.

== Notable alumni ==
- Eric Hinske, former MLB player
- James C. Kerwin, Justice of the Wisconsin Supreme Court (1905–1921)
- Jean Kraft, operatic mezzo-soprano
- Publius Virgilius Lawson, six-term mayor, historian, manufacturer, lawyer
- Leslie J. Westberg, U.S. Air Force brigadier general

== Notable faculty ==
- Elda Anderson, physicist
- John Callahan, former Superintendent of Public Instruction of Wisconsin (1921-1949)
