= Weis Earth Science Museum =

Museum in Appleton, Wisconsin, US

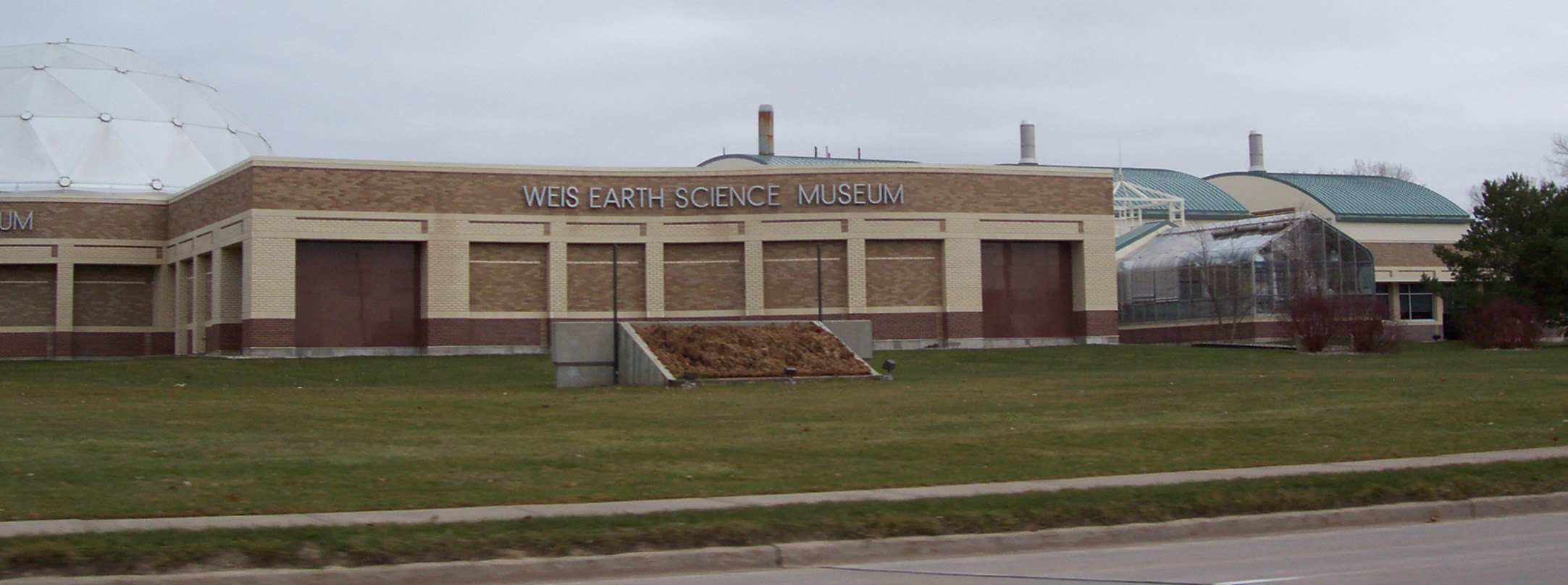
- Weis Earth Science Museum

- Location of Weis Earth Science Museum Weis Earth Science Museum (the United States)
- Established: 2002
- Location: Menasha, Wisconsin
- Coordinates: 44.2313°N 88.4158°W
- Type: Earth science
- Parking: On site
- Website: }

Weis Earth Science Museum (abbreviated as WESM) is permanently closed and the collection has been moved to the History Museum at the Castle. It was previously located at 1478 Midway Rd, on the University of Wisconsin–Oshkosh, Fox Cities Campus in Menasha, Wisconsin, USA, was opened in 2002. It focused on Wisconsin geology and its mining history. As such, it was designated as the Official Mineralogical Museum of Wisconsin by then-Governor Tommy Thompson in 2000, prior to its construction.

Due to the closure of the University of Wisconsin-Oshkosh, Fox Cities Campus, the WESM collections have been safely moved to the History Museum at the Castle. Two new exhibits, Prehistoric Wisconsin and the Gallery of the Earth, highlight the specimens from the Weis Earth Science Collection.

== Description and history ==
The museum was organized as theme galleries, interactive displays, and temporary exhibits, as well as research collections and office space. It held an estimated 10,000 specimens, of which about 1,000 were on display at any given time. Museum staff engaged in public outreach through school tours. The collections focused on the following themes as they pertain to Wisconsin and surrounding areas: Minerals, Fossils, Rocks, Sedimentary structures, Geology, Archaeology, Mining, Geologists, Geological sites, Mining history, and History of geological/archaeological studies.

The galleries were laid out as: Space Rocks (meteors and meteorites), Introduction to the Earth, Wisconsin Through Time, Wisconsin Industry, Water (Water Everywhere), Animals Through Time featuring the Bruce Danz Collection, and the Barlow Gallery of Minerals.

Curators and staff engaged in a wide range of research topics in geology and paleontology, and they have written many scientific papers and books.

The WESM is named for Leonard and Donna Weis, who provided the founding financial gift to establish the museum and to endow the director's position. Exhibits were designed by founding director Dr. Joanne Kluessendorf in conjunction with Derse Museum Group, Milwaukee. After the passing of Dr. Kluessendorf in 2018, Scott Mikulic was named interim director. In July 2019, Dr. Joseph A. Frederickson was hired as the new permanent director. Dr. Donald G. Mikulic has been a volunteer curator since the WESM's inception .

As of May 31, 2025, the WESM closed to the public. Both Winnebago and Outagamie County boards voted to have the contents of the WESM relocated to the History Museum at the Castle. They are now on display in the exhibits Prehistoric Wisconsin and the Gallery of the Earth.

== Gallery ==
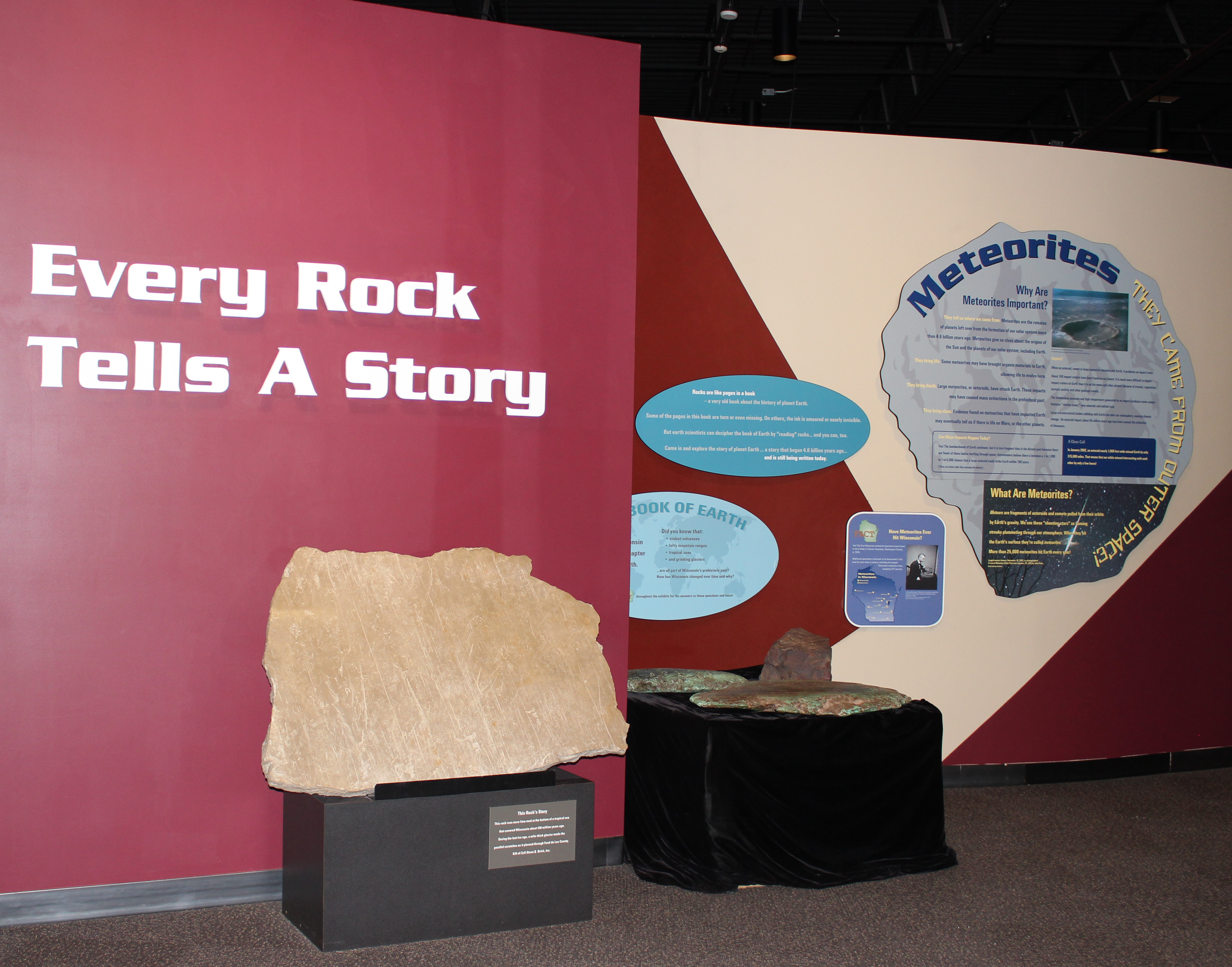
Entrance to galleries

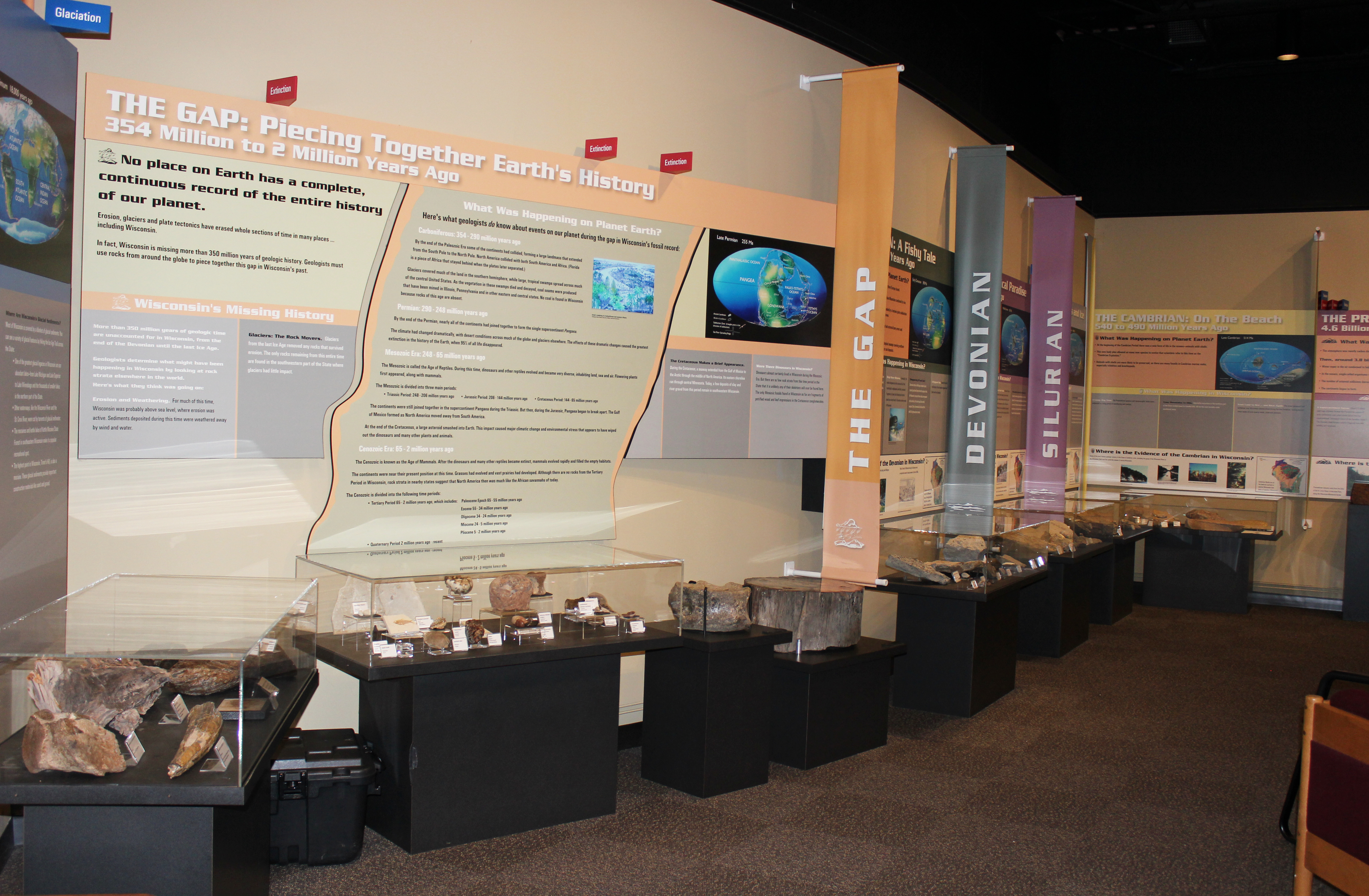
A walk through time in Wisconsin

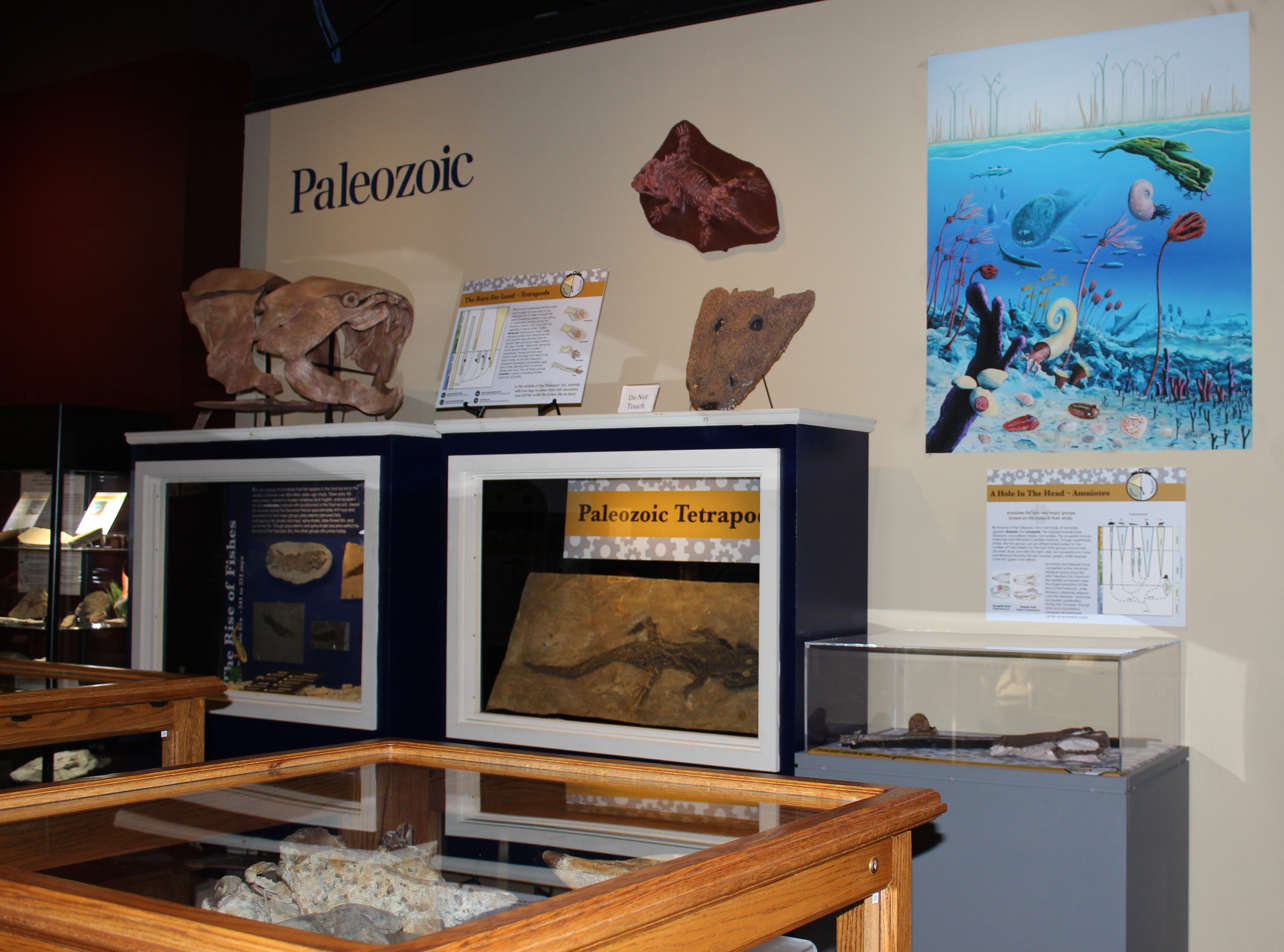
Animals through time - Paleozoic

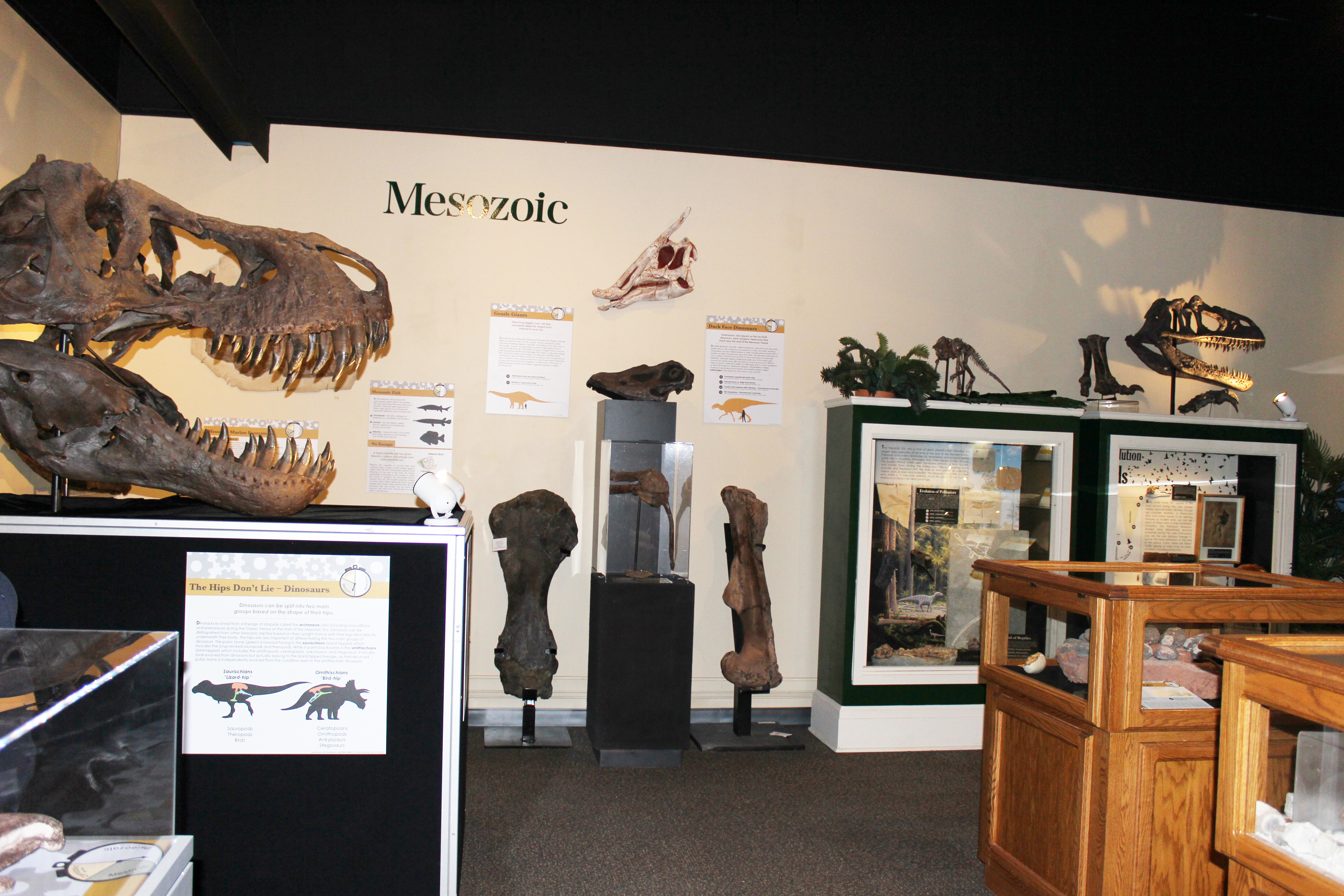
Animals through time - Mesozoic

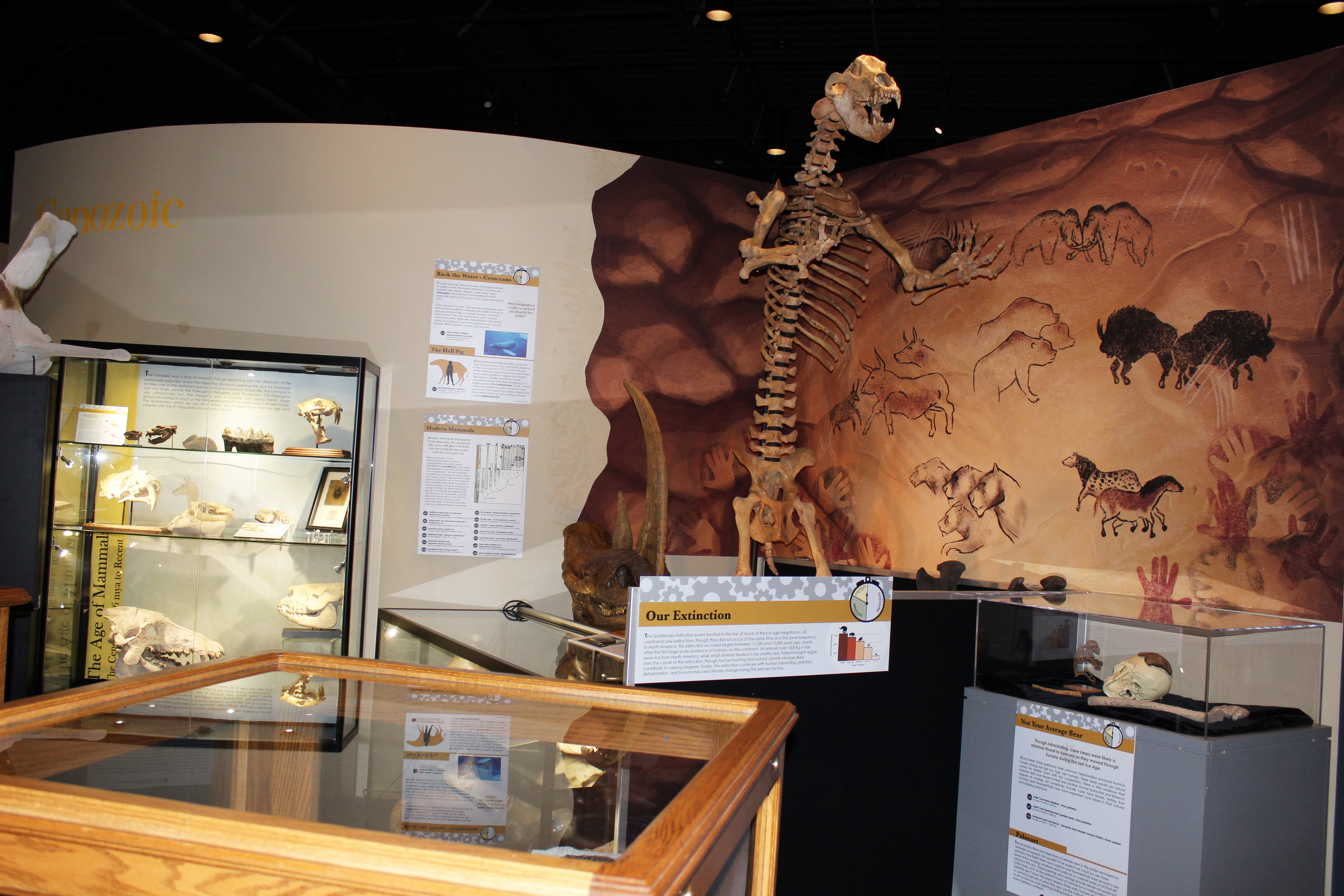
Animals through time - Cenozoic

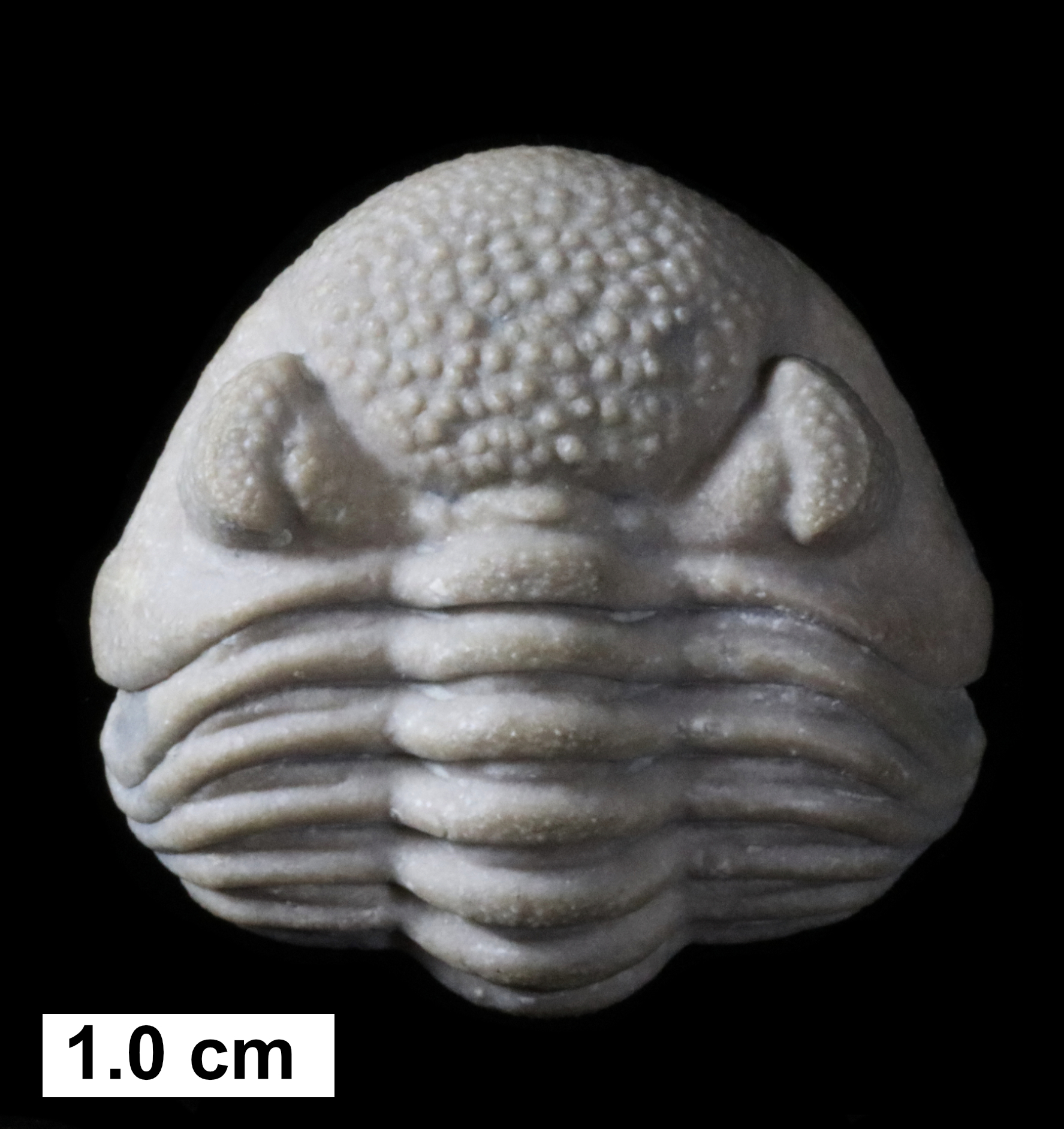
The Devonian trilobite Eldredgeops? norwoodensis, Milwaukee

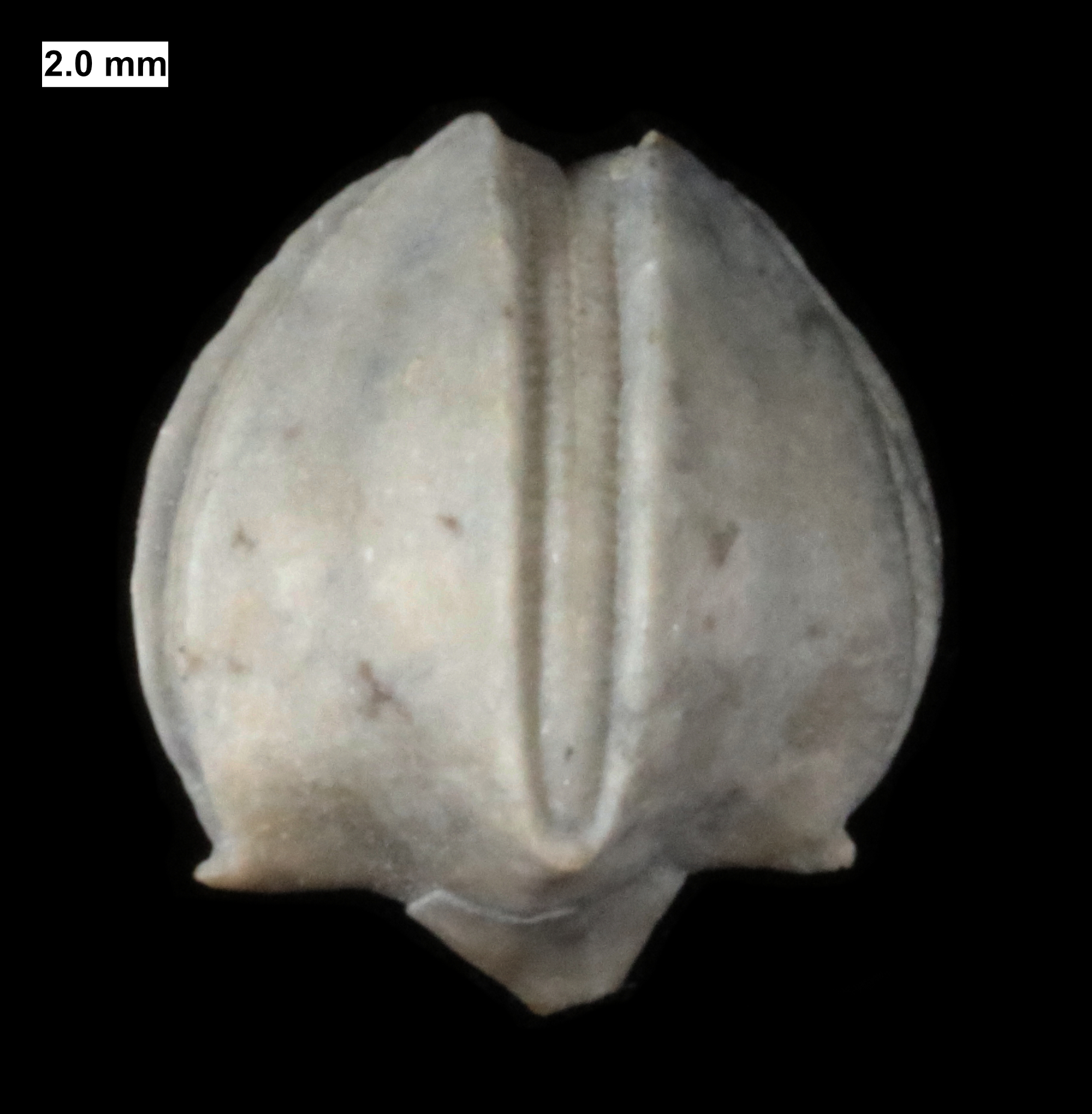
Head of the Devonian blastoid Hyperoblastus, Milwaukee

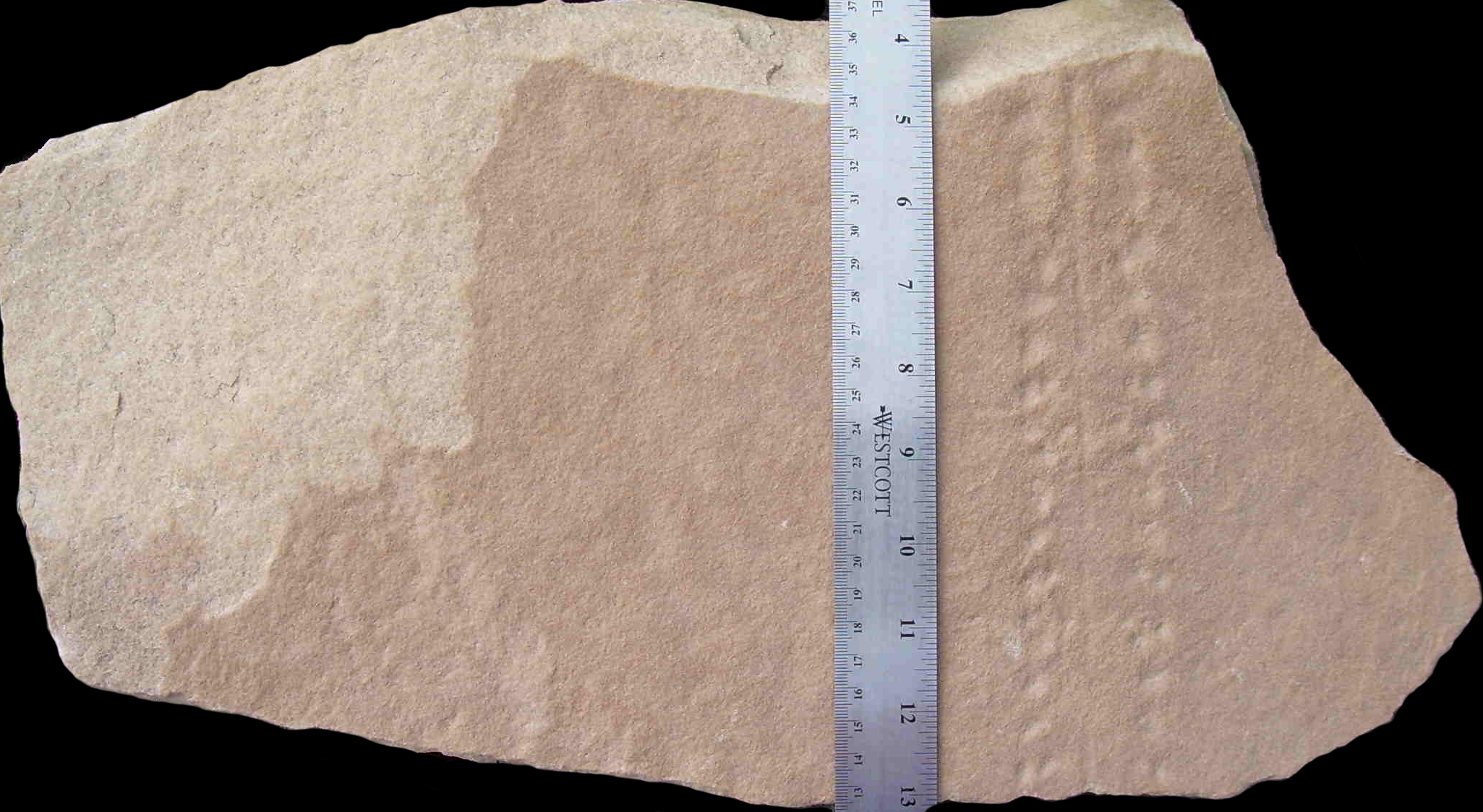
Trackway of one of the earliest land-walkers, Cambrian, central Wisconsin.
