= Menasha, Wisconsin =

- City
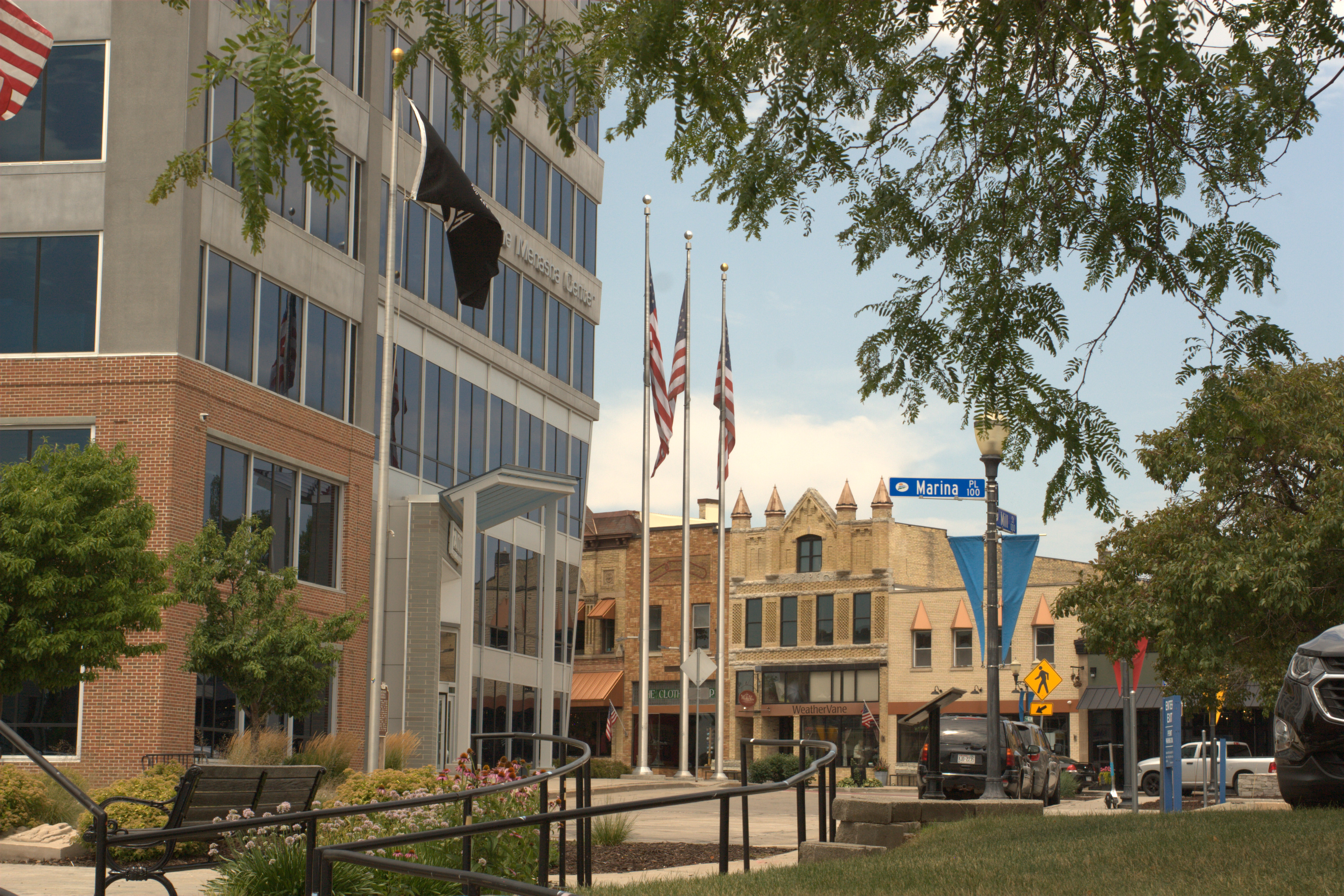
- Downtown Menasha
- Motto: "Your Place on the Water"
- Location of Menasha in Winnebago and Calumet counties, Wisconsin.

- Location within Wisconsin Location within the United States
- Coordinates: 44°13′N 88°26′W
- Country: United States
- State: Wisconsin
- Counties: Winnebago, Calumet
- Settled: 1835
- Incorporated: 1848 (town); 1853 (village); 1874 (city)
- Named for: Menominee word for "little island"

Government
  - Type: Mayor–council
  - Mayor: Austin Hammond

Area
  - Total: 7.78 sq mi (20.16 km^{2})
  - Land: 6.05 sq mi (15.66 km^{2})
  - Water: 1.74 sq mi (4.50 km^{2})
- Elevation: 750 ft (230 m)

Population (2020)
  - Total: 18,268
  - Density: 20,268.3/sq mi (7,825.64/km^{2})
- Demonym: Menashan
- Time zone: UTC−6 (Central (CST))
  - Summer (DST): UTC−5 (CDT)
- ZIP code: 54952
- Area code: 920
- FIPS code: 55-50825
- GNIS feature ID: 1569330
- Website: menashawi.gov

Menasha (/məˈnæʃə/) is a city in Winnebago and Calumet counties in the U.S. state of Wisconsin. The population was 18,268 at the 2020 census, of which 15,144 were in Winnebago County and 2,209 were in Calumet County. The city's name comes from the Menominee language, in which it is known as Menāēhsaeh, meaning "little island". At the time of European contact, a Ho-Chunk village known as "Menashay" stood on what is now Doty Island, led by Chief Hootschope (Four Legs). It is part of the Fox Cities region of Wisconsin. Doty Island is located partially in Menasha, which it shares with Neenah.

The Menominee people inhabited the Fox River Valley for over 10,000 years. In the Treaty of the Cedars (1836), the Menominee ceded approximately 4,000,000 acres of land, including present-day Menasha, to the United States for $700,000 (approximately 17 cents per acre). This cession opened the region to logging and European-American settlement. Menasha's location on the Fox River and Lake Winnebago subsequently led to its development as a transportation hub and later a center for paper production and wooden ware products.

== History ==
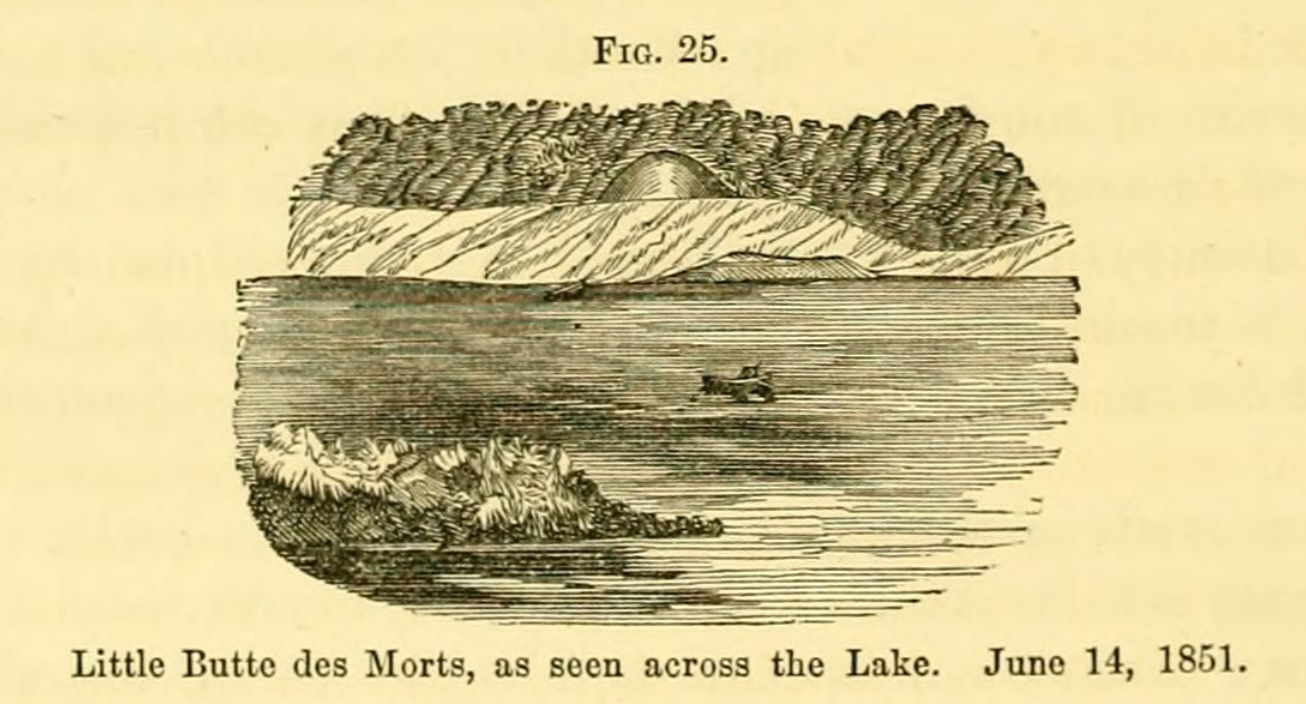
An illustration of Butte Des Morts on June 14, 1851.

The Menominee people inhabited the Fox River Valley for over 10,000 years. Ancestors of the Ho-Chunk also occupied what is currently Menasha, with a village known as "Menashay" on what is now Doty Island, led by Chief Hootschope (Four Legs). In the 1600s, the Meskwaki established a village just north of Menasha. In 1730, a surprise attack by French soldiers and traders led by Captain Paul Marin resulted in the deaths of over 1,000 Meskwaki (Fox) people residing in the area. The bodies were subsequently piled into a mass grave 12 feet high, 60 feet long, and 35 feet wide, known as Butte des Morts ("Hill of the Dead"). Despite the protests of early Wisconsin preservationist Increase A. Lapham—who argued there was "neither necessity nor excuse for its destruction"—the hill was leveled in 1863 to make way for a Chicago and North Western Railway line. The company used the excavated earth as landfill and ballast, with remains reportedly "strewn along the right of way for miles."

In 1836, the Menominee ceded approximately 4,000,000 acres of land, including present-day Menasha, to the United States in the Treaty of the Cedars for $700,000 (approximately 17 cents per acre). This opened up land for public sale, and James Duane Doty, a land speculator and politician, was one of the first investors. Doty was known for using aggressive tactics to acquire land and political influence, including offering legislators choice lots in exchange for favorable votes; one of his business partners, Michigan Governor Stevens Mason, described him as "a liar, a calumniator and a swindler." In 1848, Doty and his associates, including Curtis Reed, formed the town of Menasha on the channel north of Doty Island. In 1849, Reed and Doty were successful in convincing the United States government to place the navigational channel of the Fox-Wisconsin waterway through the north channel in Menasha. In 1854 Menasha approved $150,000 in bonding to bring the Manitowoc & Mississippi Railroad in with the intent of establishing Menasha as the principal transportation axis in Wisconsin. Menasha was incorporated as a city in 1874, and at that point was considered to be a transportation hub.

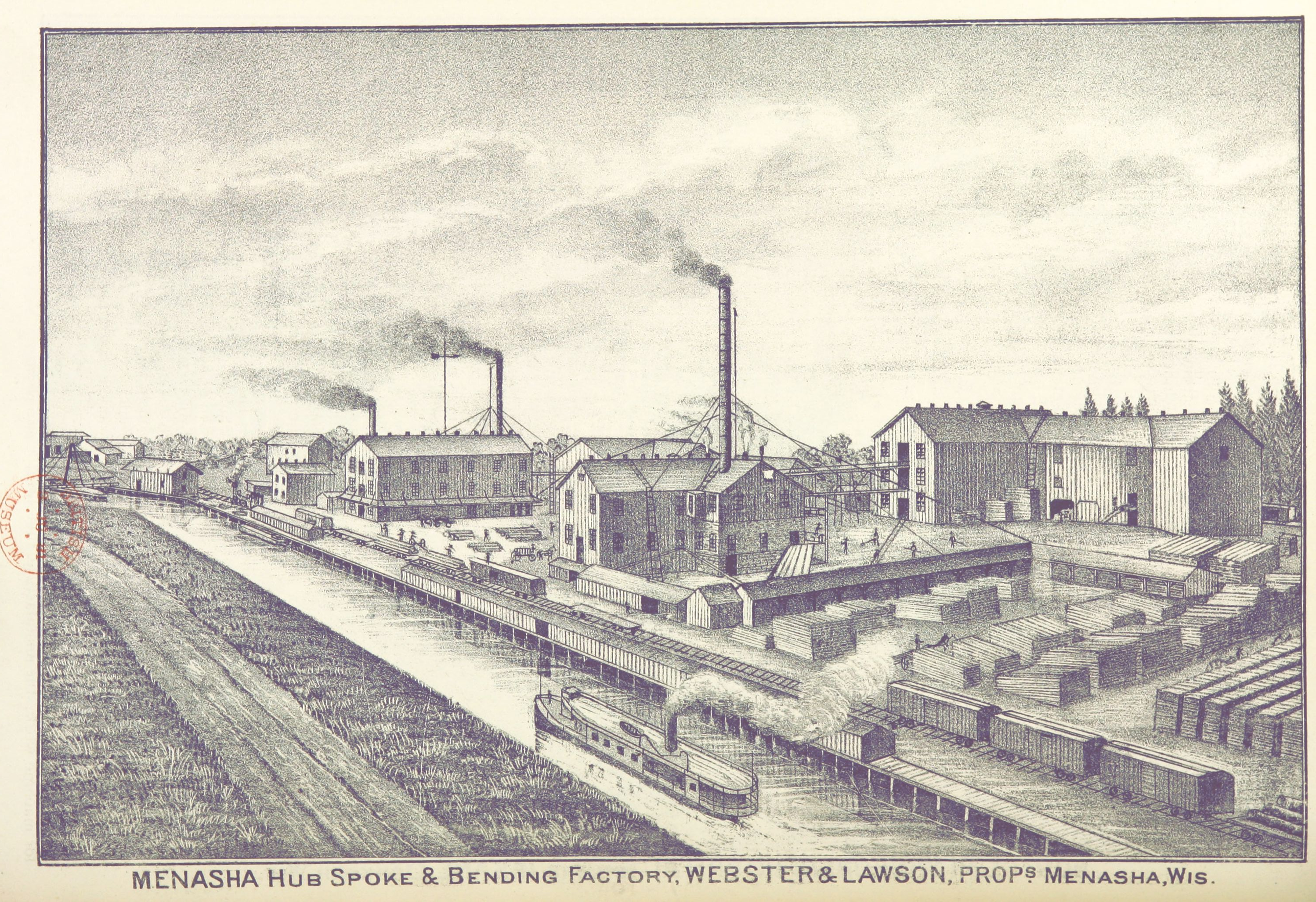
Former Menasha Hub Spoke and Bending Factory

The early 1900s saw a shift to industrial production of general and specialized papers. Menasha was home to many paper mills including the George A. Whiting Paper Company Mill, the John Strange Paper Mill, Island Paper Company, and Gilbert Paper Company, to name a few. Menasha was also home to the George Banta Publishing Company which published textbooks, military manuals, yearbooks, and magazines.

Menasha Corporation also called Menasha home. It was established in 1849 by Elisha D. Smith as Menasha Wooden Ware. It produced wooden containers like butter tubs and barrels and eventually became the world's largest wooden ware products manufacturer. After wooden ware products fell out of use in the early 1900s, Menasha Wooden Ware shifted to the corrugated packaging business, changing its name to Menasha Corporation.

On July 27, 2026, Menasha was struck by a large and extremely destructive EF3 tornado, causing severe damage to the city. The tornado had initially touched down to the north in neighboring Appleton, and inflicted severe damage in both cities before moving over Lake Winnebago, becoming a waterspout and dissipating. There were 98 injuries as a result of the tornado, although there were no fatalities.

== Geography ==
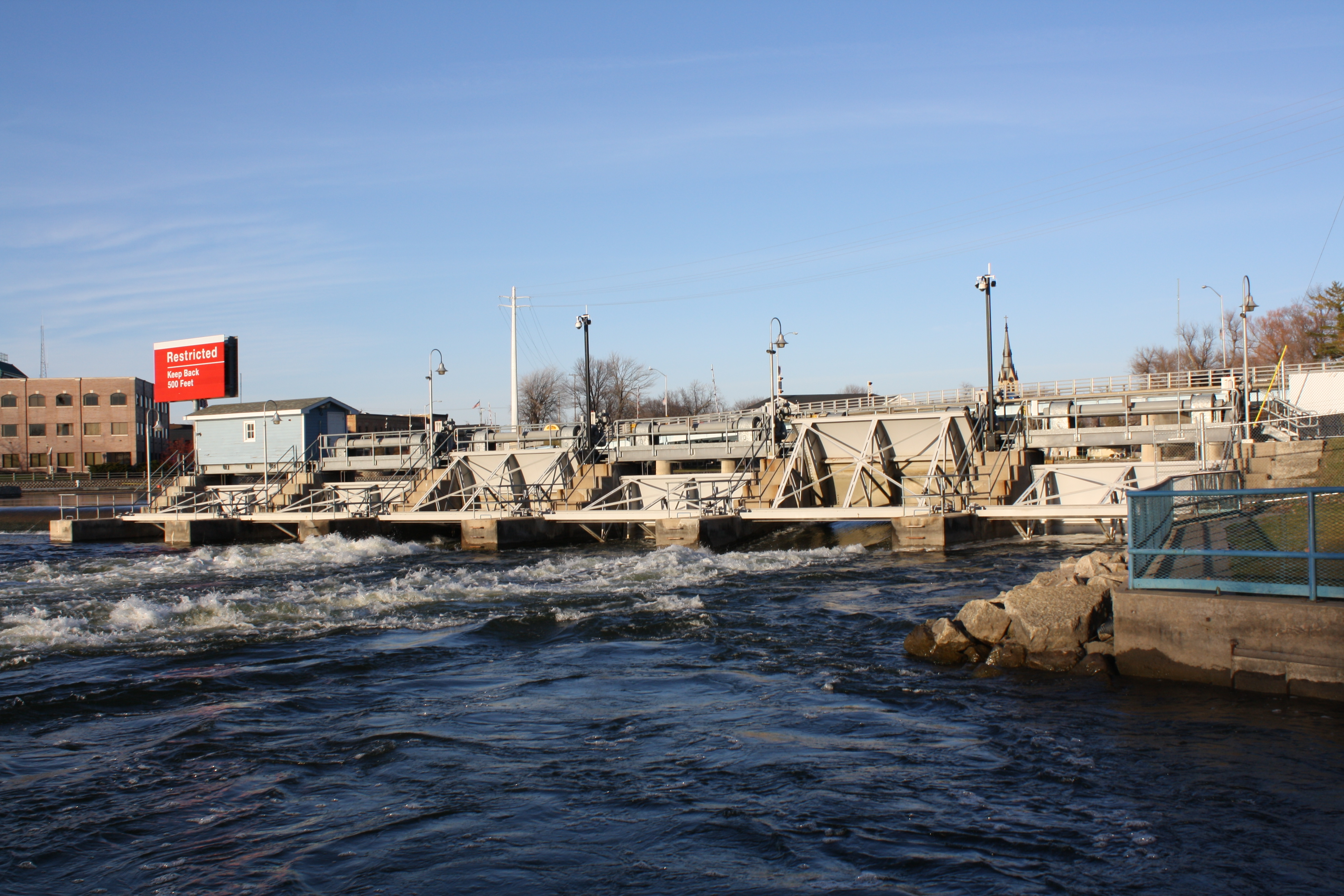
Menasha Dam

Menasha is located at 44°13′N 88°26′W (44.2129, −88.4362). According to the United States Census Bureau, the city has a total area of 7.52 square miles (19.48 km^{2}), of which, 6.03 square miles (15.62 km^{2}) is land and 1.49 square miles (3.86 km^{2}) is water.

== Demographics ==
Historical population
| Census | Pop. | Note | %± |
|---|---|---|---|
| 1860 | 1,436 | | — |
| 1870 | 2,484 | | 73.0% |
| 1880 | 3,144 | | 26.6% |
| 1890 | 4,581 | | 45.7% |
| 1900 | 5,589 | | 22.0% |
| 1910 | 6,081 | | 8.8% |
| 1920 | 7,214 | | 18.6% |
| 1930 | 9,062 | | 25.6% |
| 1940 | 10,481 | | 15.7% |
| 1950 | 12,385 | | 18.2% |
| 1960 | 14,647 | | 18.3% |
| 1970 | 14,836 | | 1.3% |
| 1980 | 14,728 | | −0.7% |
| 1990 | 14,711 | | −0.1% |
| 2000 | 16,331 | | 11.0% |
| 2010 | 17,353 | | 6.3% |
| 2020 | 18,268 | | 5.3% |
U.S. Decennial Census

Menasha is a city in the Appleton–Oshkosh–Neenah CSA, a Combined Statistical Area which includes the Appleton (Calumet and Outagamie counties) and Oshkosh–Neenah (Winnebago County) metropolitan areas, which had a combined population of 392,660 at the 2010 census and an estimated population of 409,881 as of 2019.

=== 2020 census ===
As of the 2020 census, Menasha had a population of 18,268. The population density was 3,021.5 inhabitants per square mile (1,166.6/km^{2}). The median age was 38.5 years. 22.3% of residents were under the age of 18 and 15.2% of residents were 65 years of age or older. For every 100 females there were 99.7 males, and for every 100 females age 18 and over there were 97.2 males age 18 and over.

100.0% of residents lived in urban areas, while 0.0% lived in rural areas.

There were 7,891 households in Menasha, of which 27.5% had children under the age of 18 living in them. Of all households, 42.3% were married-couple households, 21.7% were households with a male householder and no spouse or partner present, and 26.3% were households with a female householder and no spouse or partner present. About 33.0% of all households were made up of individuals and 11.5% had someone living alone who was 65 years of age or older.

There were 8,282 housing units, of which 4.7% were vacant. The homeowner vacancy rate was 0.8% and the rental vacancy rate was 4.5%.

Racial composition as of the 2020 census
| Race | Number | Percent |
|---|---|---|
| White | 14,817 | 81.1% |
| Black or African American | 420 | 2.3% |
| American Indian and Alaska Native | 160 | 0.9% |
| Asian | 701 | 3.8% |
| Native Hawaiian and Other Pacific Islander | 1 | 0.0% |
| Some other race | 922 | 5.0% |
| Two or more races | 1,247 | 6.8% |
| Hispanic or Latino (of any race) | 1,873 | 10.3% |

=== 2010 census ===
At the 2010 census there were 17,353 people, 7,405 households, and 4,415 families living in the city. The population density was 2,877.8 inhabitants per square mile (1,111.1/km^{2}). There were 7,973 housing units at an average density of 1,322.2 units per square mile (510.5 units/km^{2}). The racial makeup of the city was 90.8% White, 1.2% African American, 0.7% Native American, 2.2% Asian, 0.1% Pacific Islander, 3.0% from other races, and 2.1% from two or more races. Hispanic or Latino of any race were 6.9%.

Of the 7,405 households 30.7% had children under the age of 18 living with them, 43.6% were married couples living together, 10.9% had a female householder with no husband present, 5.1% had a male householder with no wife present, and 40.4% were non-families. 32.2% of households were one person and 9.9% were one person aged 65 or older. The average household size was 2.32 and the average family size was 2.95.

The median age was 36 years. 24.8% of residents were under the age of 18; 8.2% were between the ages of 18 and 24; 29.1% were from 25 to 44; 26.4% were from 45 to 64; and 11.6% were 65 or older. The gender makeup of the city was 49.4% male and 50.6% female.

=== 2000 census ===
At the 2000 census there were 16,331 people, 6,951 households, and 4,233 families living in the city. The population density was 3,106.9 people per square mile (1,199.6 people/km^{2}). There were 7,271 housing units at an average density of 1,383.3 units per square mile (534.1 units/km^{2}). The racial makeup of the city was 94.80% White, 0.54% African American, 0.61% Native American, 1.62% Asian, 0.02% Pacific Islander, 1.38% from other races, and 1.04% from two or more races. Hispanic or Latino of any race were 3.61%.

Of the 6,951 households 31.7% had children under the age of 18 living with them, 46.1% were married couples living together, 10.8% had a female householder with no husband present, and 39.1% were non-families. 31.8% of households were one person and 10.0% were one person aged 65 or older. The average household size was 2.35 and the average family size was 2.99.

The age distribution was 25.6% under the age of 18, 9.6% from 18 to 24, 33.6% from 25 to 44, 19.4% from 45 to 64, and 11.8% 65 or older. The median age was 34 years. For every 100 females, there were 96.7 males. For every 100 females age 18 and over, there were 93.4 males.

The median household income was $39,936 and the median family income was $47,401. Males had a median income of $36,705 versus $25,176 for females. The per capita income for the city was $20,743. About 5.4% of families and 6.5% of the population were below the poverty line, including 8.5% of those under age 18 and 8.2% of those age 65 or over.

=== Religion ===
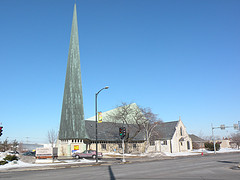
Menasha's St. Thomas Episcopal Church was designed by Harry Weese

The Wisconsin Evangelical Lutheran Synod (WELS) has two churches in Menasha: Bethel Lutheran Church and Mount Calvary Lutheran Church.

Architect Harry Weese designed Menasha's St Thomas' Episcopal Church.

== Parks and recreation ==
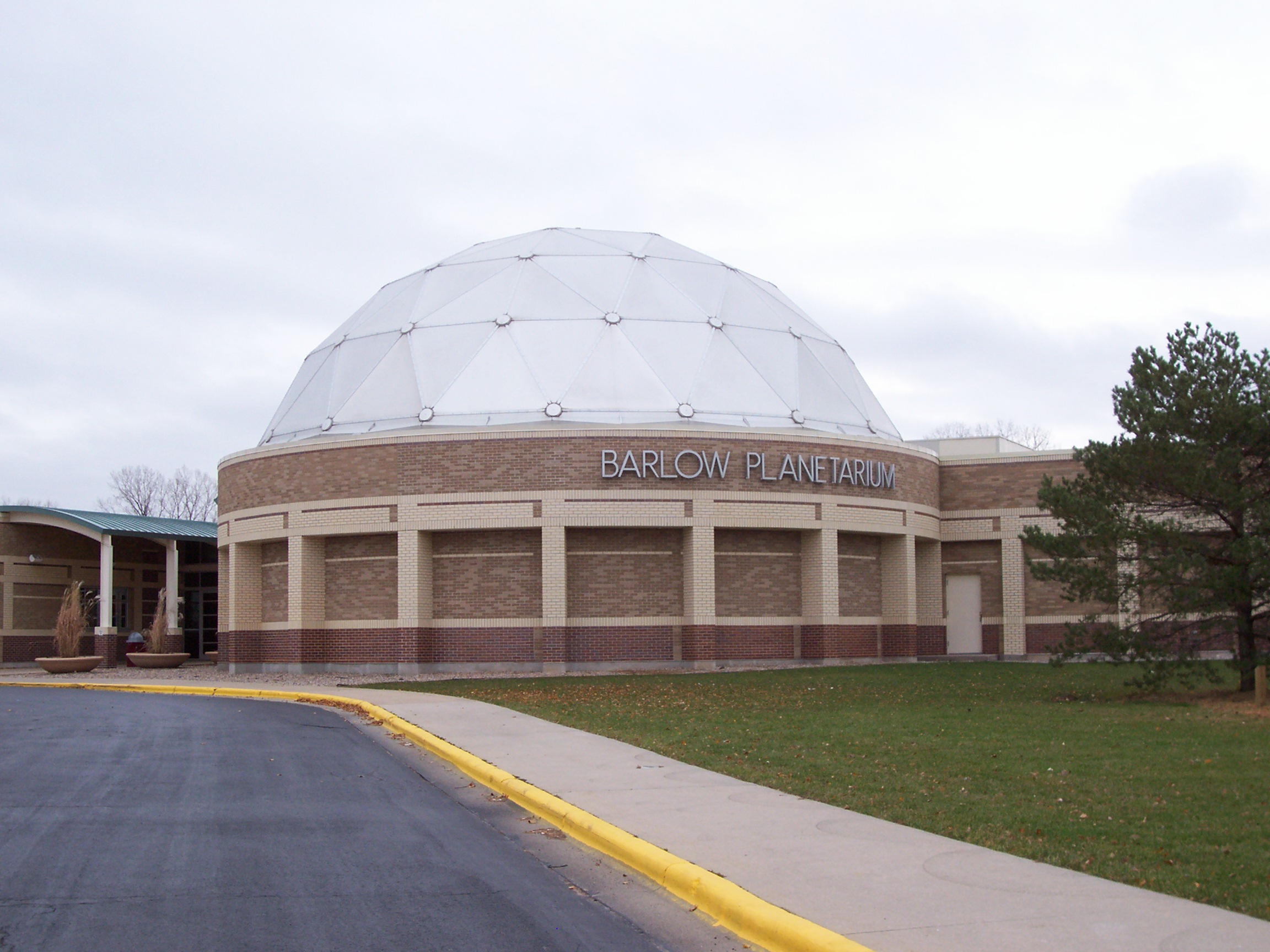
Barlow Planetarium

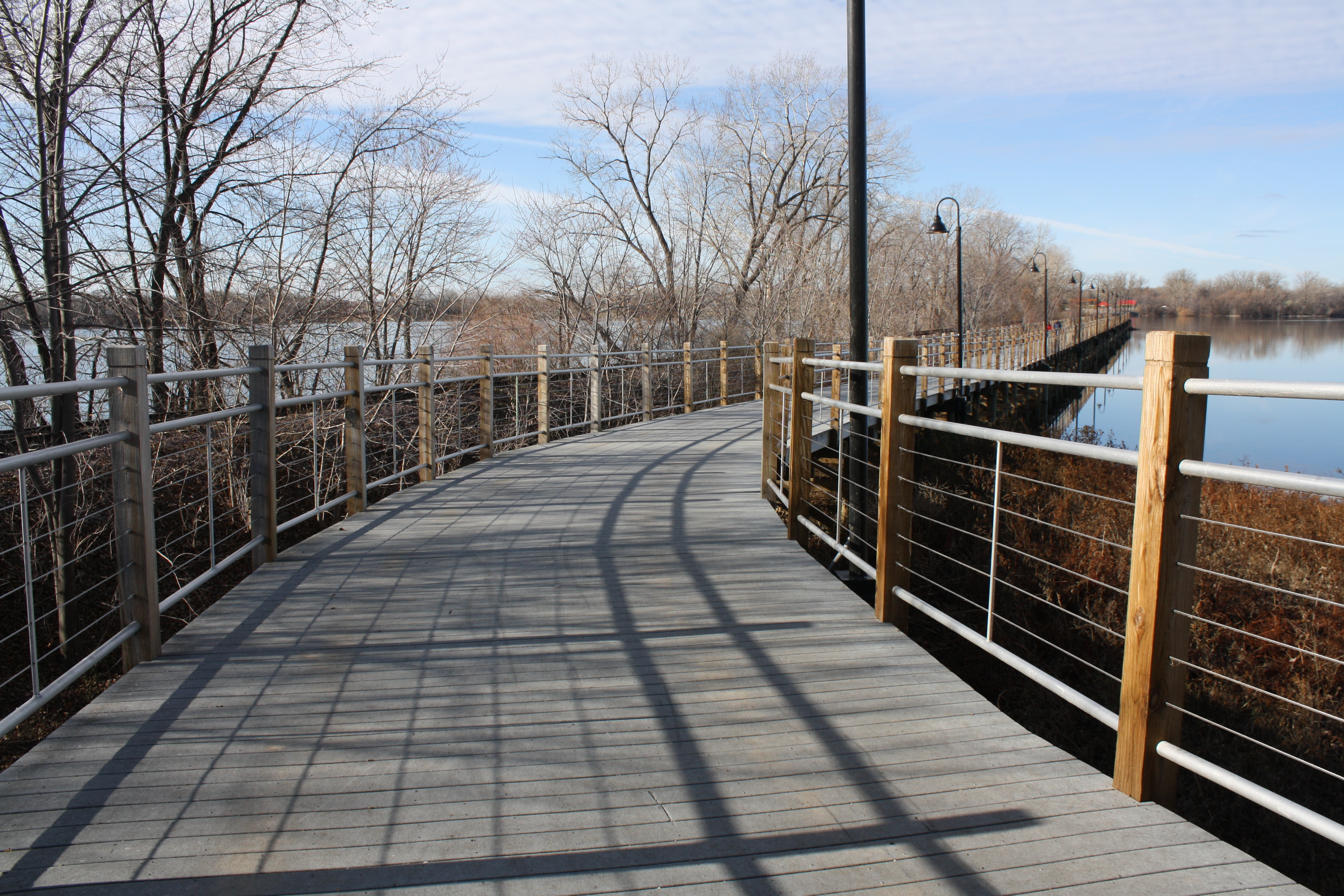
The Loop the Little Lake Trail

The 91-acre Heckrodt Wetland Reserve is an urban nature reserve with habitats including forested wetland, cattail marsh, open water, created prairie, open field, and upland forest. The University of Wisconsin–Oshkosh, Fox Cities Campus houses the Weis Earth Science Museum and the Barlow Planetarium.

Menasha contains numerous parks. It has a public pool located in Jefferson Park. Smith Park is the oldest park in the Menasha Park system, established in 1897.

A railroad caboose in Smith Park commemorates the original Wisconsin Central Railroad. At the southern end of the park are several Native American burial mounds and a natural amphitheater used for summer concerts. The north end of the park features semi-formal gardens planted each year with approximately 6,000 annuals, a setting that is a favorite for summer weddings. A gazebo funded with corporate donations was built in this area in 1997.

== Government ==
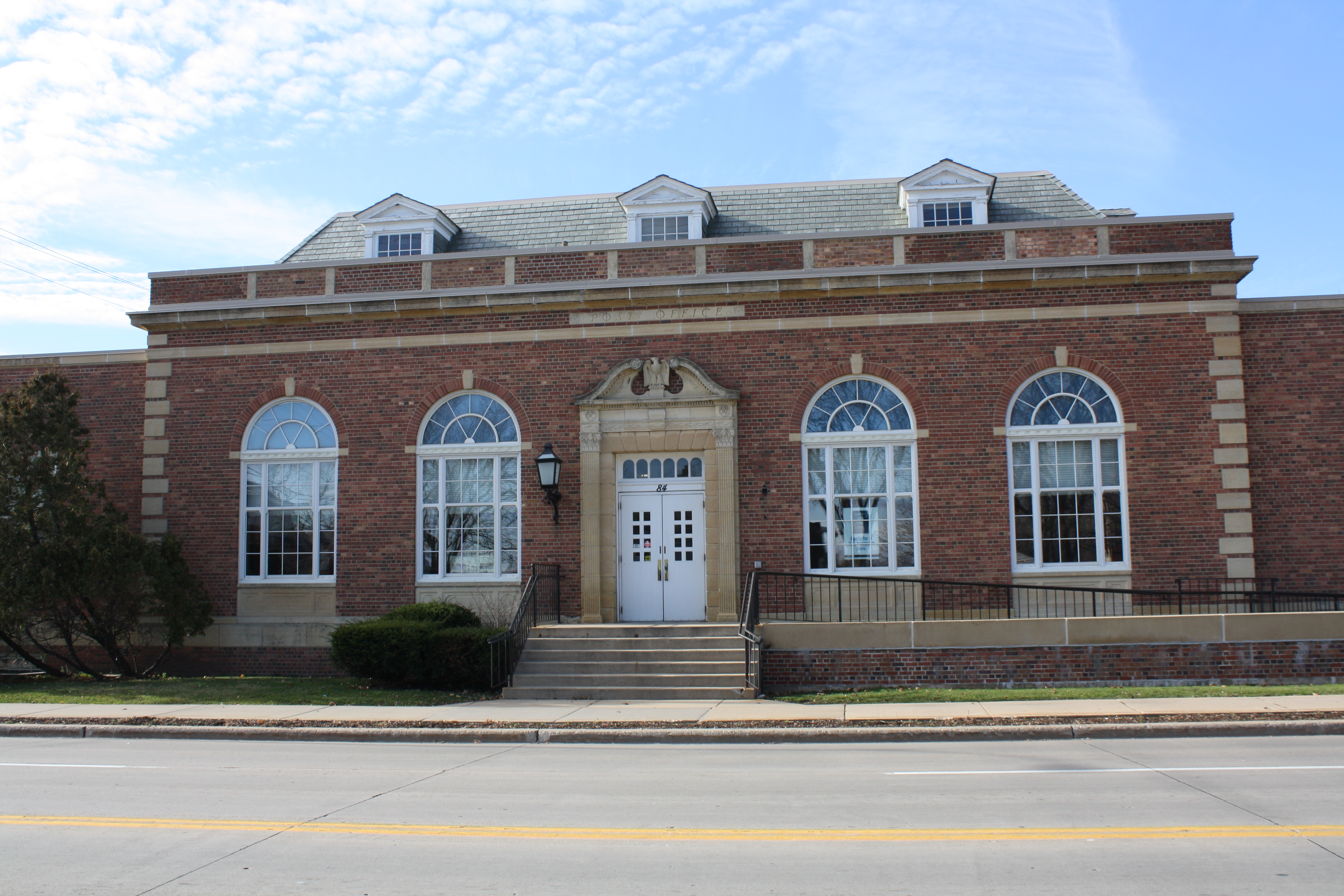
Menasha Post Office

The city of Menasha has a mayor–council government. There are eight districts in the city, each represented by an aldermen. The council meets weekly with the mayor, Austin Hammond.

List of Menasha's village presidents:

Village Presidents of Menasha, Wisconsin, since incorporation as a village in 1853
| Order | Term start | Term end | Village President | Notes |
|---|---|---|---|---|
| 1 | 1853 | 1854 | Curtis Reed | There is no official record for the first election, although the first meeting minutes lists Curtis Reed as president. |
| 2 | 1854 | 1855 | Curtis Reed | |
| 3 | 1855 | 1856 | Joseph Turner | |
| 4 | 1856 | 1857 | Joseph Turner | |
| 5 | 1857 | 1858 | Joseph Turner | |
| 6 | 1858 | 1859 | Curtis Reed | |
| 7 | 1859 | 1860 | John A. Bryan | |
| 8 | 1860 | 1861 | John A. Bryan | |
| 9 | 1861 | 1862 | Charles Doty | |
| 10 | 1862 | 1863 | Charles Doty | |
| 11 | 1863 | 1864 | Elisha D. Smith | |
| 12 | 1864 | 1865 | Elisha D. Smith | |
| 13 | 1865 | 1866 | Curtis Reed | |
| 14 | 1866 | 1867 | Curtis Reed | |
| 15 | 1867 | 1868 | Curtis Reed | No record of election, though the same officers stayed in their offices. |
| 16 | 1868 | 1869 | John Potter, Jr. | |
| 17 | 1869 | 1870 | John Potter, Jr. | No record of election, though the same officers stayed in their offices. |
| 18 | 1870 | 1871 | A. E. Bates | |
| 19 | 1871 | 1872 | Fred Schuellen | |
| 20 | 1872 | 1873 | Fred Schuellen | |
| 21 | 1873 | 1874 | O. J. Hall | |

List of Menasha's mayors:

Mayors of Menasha, Wisconsin, since incorporation as a city in 1874
| Order | Term start | Term end | Mayor | Notes |
|---|---|---|---|---|
| 1 | 1874 | 1875 | O.J. Hall | |
| 2 | 1875 | 1879 | P.V. Lawson, Sr. | |
| 3 | 1879 | 1882 | A.J. Webster | |
| 4 | 1882 | 1883 | Silas Bullard | |
| 5 | 1883 | 1885 | A.J. Webster | |
| 6 | 1885 | 1886 | L.G. Noble | |
| 7 | 1886 | 1890 | P.V. Lawson, Jr. | |
| 8 | 1890 | 1892 | Curtis Reed | |
| 9 | 1892 | 1893 | George Banta | |
| 10 | 1893 | 1894 | P.V. Lawson, Jr. | |
| 11 | 1894 | 1895 | John Rosch | |
| 12 | 1895 | 1896 | George Banta | |
| 13 | 1896 | 1897 | P.V. Lawson, Jr. | |
| 14 | 1897 | 1898 | J.M. Pleasants | |
| 15 | 1898 | 1900 | M.M. Schoetz | |
| 16 | 1900 | 1901 | J.M. Pleasants | |
| 17 | 1901 | 1902 | Henry Fitzgibbon | |
| 18 | 1902 | 1904 | George Banta | |
| 19 | 1904 | 1908 | August J. Henning | |
| 20 | 1908 | 1910 | N.G. Remmel | |
| 21 | 1910 | 1912 | Joesph Hill | |
| 22 | 1912 | 1919 | N.G. Remmel | |
| 23 | 1919 | 1922 | T.E. McGillan | "Elected mayor of Menasha to fill out an unexpired term" and then re-elected without opposition. |
| 24 | 1922 | 1924 | M.M. Schoetz | |
| 25 | 1924 | 1928 | N.G. Remmel | |
| 26 | 1928 | 1930 | W.E. Held | |
| 27 | 1930 | 1934 | N.G. Remmel | |
| 28 | 1934 | 1936 | F.O. Heckrodt | |
| 29 | 1936 | 1938 | W.E. Held | |
| 30 | 1938 | 1946 | W.H. Jensen | |
| 31 | 1946 | 1956 | John R. Scanlon | |
| 32 | 1956 | 1960 | R.G. DuCharme | |
| 33 | 1960 | 1966 | John L. Klein | |
| 34 | 1966 | 1968 | Kenneth E. Holmes | |
| 35 | 1968 | 1970 | John L. Klein | |
| 36 | 1970 | 1974 | James Adams | |
| 37 | 1974 | 1982 | Victor V. Wiecki | |
| 38 | 1982 | 1988 | Thom A. Ciske | |
| 39 | 1988 | 2008 | Joseph F. Laux | |
| 40 | 2008 | 2024 | Donald Merkes | |
| 41 | 2024 | Present | Austin R. Hammond | |

== Education ==
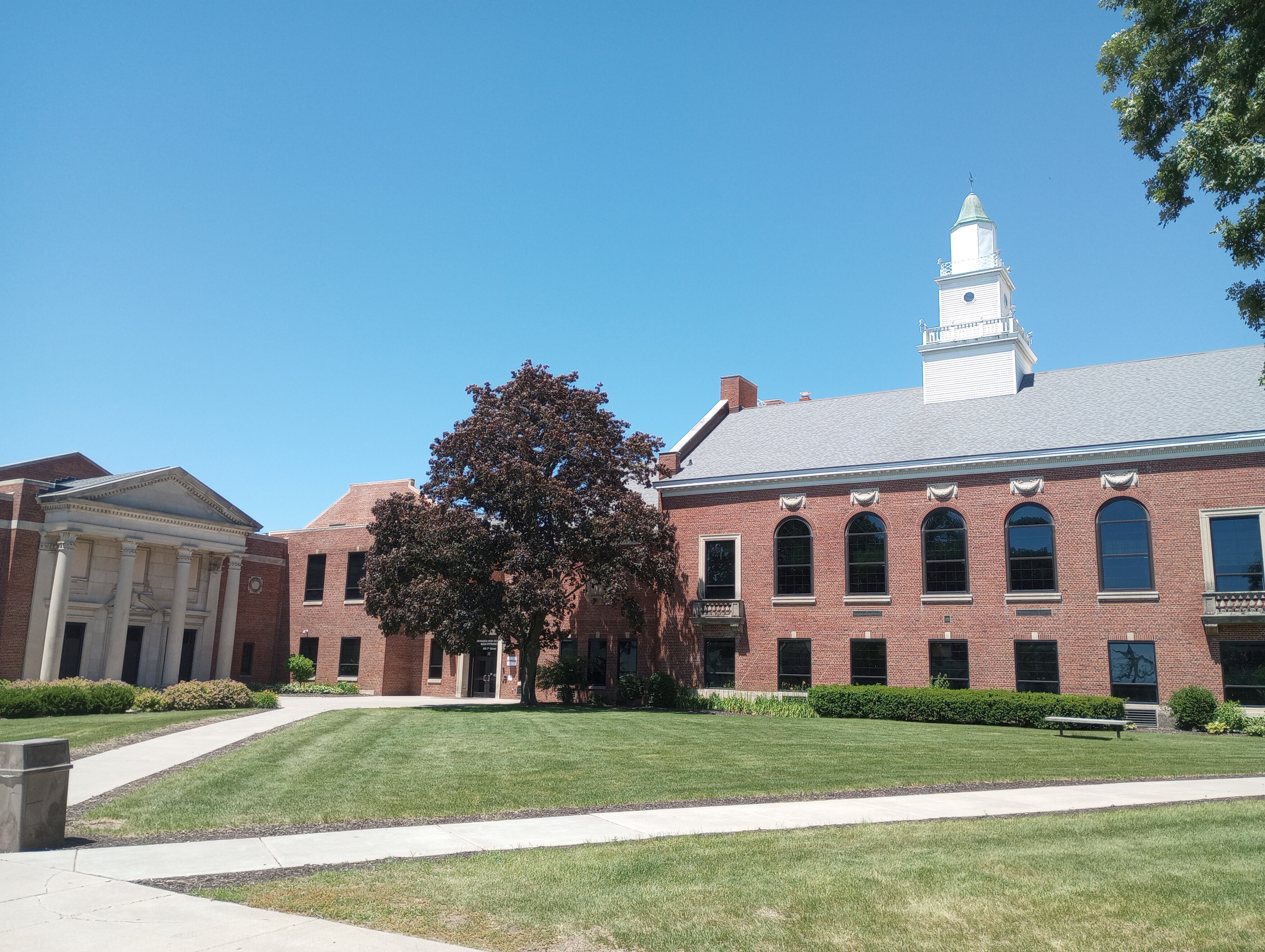
Menasha High School

Menasha's Public School system, called the Menasha Joint School District has one high school (Menasha High School), one middle school, and five elementary schools. Banta Bilingual Elementary School's program provides instruction in both English and Spanish, with the goal of developing students with proficiency in both languages.

Parochial education is offered at St. Mary Catholic Elementary School, Bethel Lutheran School (elementary and middle), and Trinity Lutheran School (elementary and middle).

Menasha was home to the University of Wisconsin–Oshkosh, Fox Cities Campus, a two-year campus part of the UW System. The campus closed in 2025 as part of four other campus closures.

== Friendly cities ==
- Maebashi, Japan

== Notable people ==
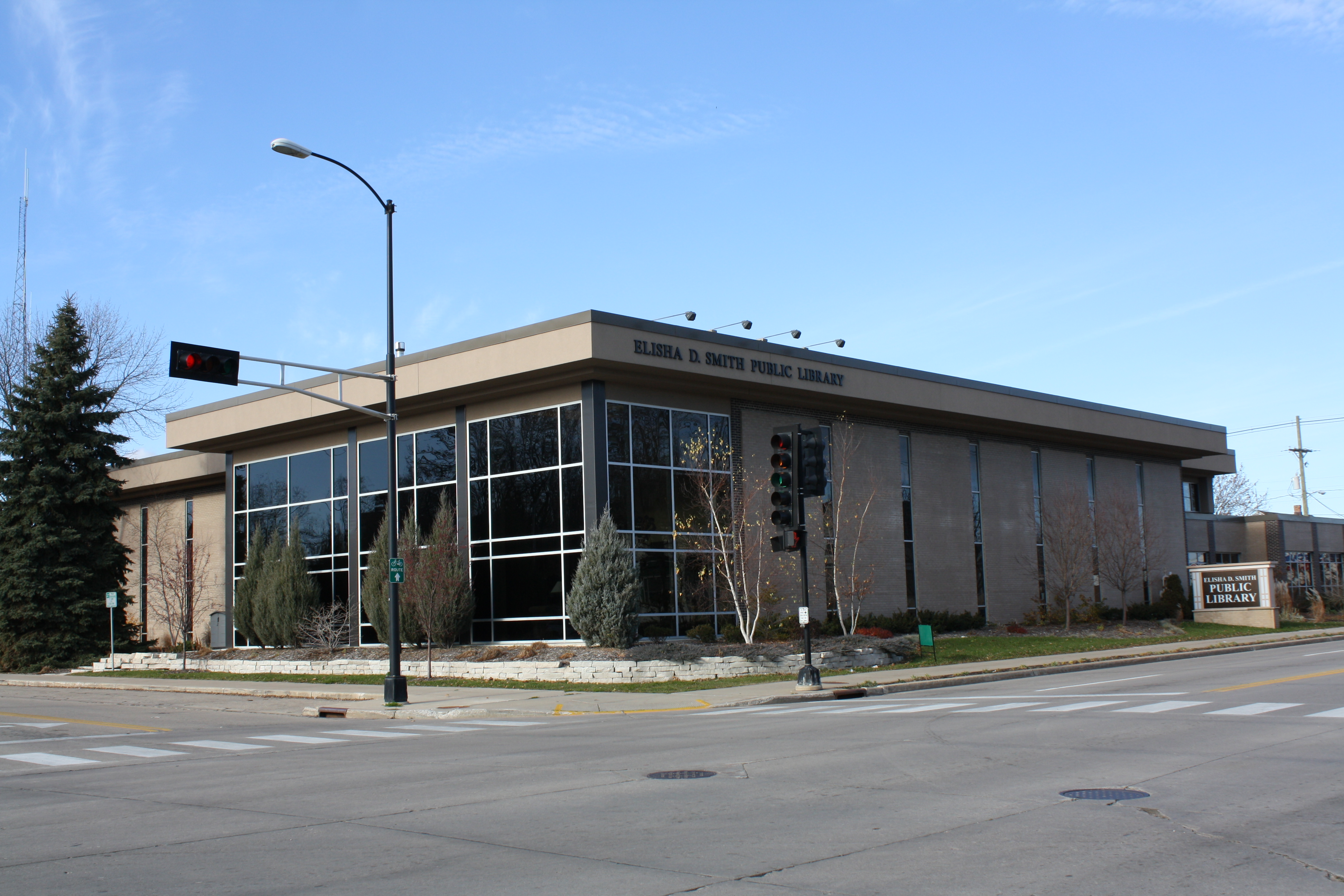
Elisha D. Smith Public Library in Menasha

- Joseph H. Anderson, legislator
- John A. Bryan, U.S. diplomat
- Silas Bullard, jurist and legislator
- Elmer J. Burr, Medal of Honor recipient
- Arnold J. Cane, jurist and legislator
- Connie Clausen, television and Broadway actress, literary agent, and author of "I Love You Honey but The Season's Over", a memoir about Menasha
- Jean Pond Miner Coburn, sculptor
- Samuel A. Cook, U.S. Representative
- John Dollard, psychologist
- William Duchman, legislator and sawmill operator
- A. D. Eldridge, legislator and businessman
- William P. Grimes, legislator and businessman
- Eric Hinske, hitting coach for the Arizona Diamondbacks and 2002 American League Rookie of the Year
- Joan Jaykoski, baseball player
- James C. Kerwin, Wisconsin Supreme Court
- Dave Koslo, MLB player for the New York Giants, Baltimore Orioles, and the Milwaukee Braves
- Jean Kraft, opera singer
- Publius Virgilius Lawson, six-term mayor, historian, manufacturer, lawyer
- George Liberace, musician and television performer, older brother of Liberace
- Jeff Loomis, heavy metal guitarist
- Thomas J. O'Malley, Lieutenant Governor of Wisconsin
- Curtis Reed, mayor of Menasha, businessman
- Richard J. Steffens, legislator
- Leslie J. Westberg, U.S. Air Force brigadier general
