= Leslie J. Westberg =

United States Air Force general

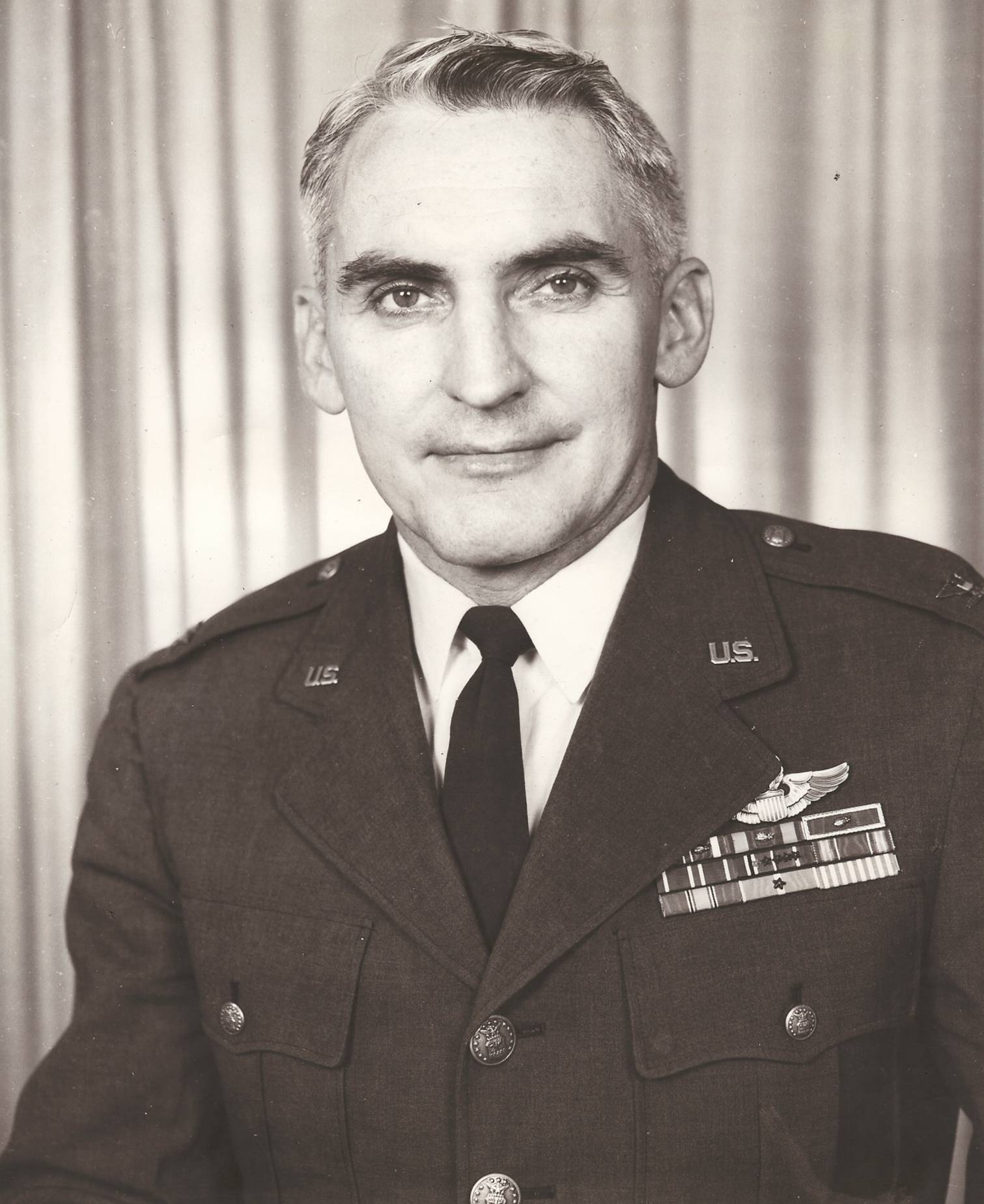
- Westberg in 1963
- Born: June 23, 1920; Menasha, Wisconsin, U.S.
- Died: January 4, 1997 (aged 76)
- Occupation: United States Air Force officer

Leslie J. Westberg (June 23, 1920 – January 4, 1997) was a brigadier general in the United States Air Force. He piloted bombers on combat missions in both World War II and the Korean War and reconnaissance aircraft in the Vietnam War.

== Early life and education ==
Westberg was born June 23, 1920, in Menasha, Wisconsin, the son of Charles Alfred Westberg and Marie A. Pawer Westberg. He attended Menasha High School in 1938, and later attended the University of Omaha. He graduated from the National War College in 1967.

== Career ==
=== World War II ===
Westberg enlisted in September 1942 in the United States Army Air Forces and entered civilian pilot training and the aviation cadet program. He graduated in November 1943 with a commission as second lieutenant and his pilot wings. He received training as a bomber pilot at Maxwell Field, Charleston, and Langley Field. Westberg served from June 1944 to April 1945 with the Fifteenth Air Force in Italy and flew 35 combat missions in B-24 Liberator bombers.

=== 1940s and 1950s ===
From 1945 to 1954, he served in various bomber organizations as lead crew aircraft commander on B-25 Mitchell, B-26 Invader, B-29 Superfortress, and B-36 Peacemaker medium and heavy bomber aircraft; operations officer; inspector; and as maintenance and tactical squadron commander at Memphis, Tennessee, and Fairchild Air Force Base, Washington.

He flew 27 combat missions in B-29s in 1950 with the United Nations Forces during the Korean War.

He served from October 1954 to August 1957 at March Air Force Base, California, in staff and command positions, flying B-47 Stratojets with the 22d and 320th Bombardment Wings. He then became base commander of Davis-Monthan Air Force Base in Arizona, a position he held until October 1958.

General Westberg next served at Strategic Air Command headquarters at Omaha, Nebraska, as deputy chief of the Command Control Division. In January 1962 he was transferred to Washington, D.C., where he served as Chief, Operations Division, and later as Deputy Chief, Joint Alternate Command Element, in the organization of the Joint Chiefs of Staff.

=== 1960s and Vietnam War ===
He served at Hahn Air Base, Germany, from September 1963 to June 1965 and flew F-100 Super Sabre aircraft with the 50th Tactical Fighter Wing as deputy commander for operations and later vice commander. He then served at Incirlik Air Base, Turkey, from June 1965 to August 1966 as commander of The United States Logistic Group Detachment 10 and flew F-105 and F-100 aircraft with Tactical Air Command rotational units.

After graduation from the National War College in August 1967, General Westberg served at Shaw Air Force Base, South Carolina, as commander of the 363d Tactical Reconnaissance Wing, and was an RF-4C Phantom pilot.

He was transferred in July 1968 to the Republic of Vietnam, where he commanded the 460th Tactical Reconnaissance Wing at Tan Son Nhut Airfield. Later he became chief of staff of the Seventh Air Force. During his Vietnam tour of duty, he flew 600 hours and a total of 240 combat missions in the RF-4C reconnaissance aircraft.

He moved to Hawaii in August 1969 to become Deputy Assistant Chief of Staff for Operations, Pacific Command.

=== 1970s and Civil Air Patrol ===
General Westberg was the commander of Headquarters Civil Air Patrol-U.S. Air Force, Maxwell Air Force Base, Ala., and the National Commander of the Civil Air Patrol, the Air Force auxiliary from 1972 to 1975.

== Awards and decorations ==
Westberg was a command pilot. His military decorations and awards include the Silver Star, Legion of Merit with oak leaf cluster, Distinguished Flying Cross with oak leaf cluster, Meritorious Service Medal, Air Medal with 16 oak leaf clusters, Air Force Commendation Medal, Presidential Unit Citation Emblem, Distinguished Unit Citation Emblem, and the Air Force Outstanding Unit Award Ribbon.

He was promoted to the rank of full colonel in 1957. He was promoted to the grade of brigadier general on September 1, 1969, with date of rank May 27, 1969.

== Personal life ==
Westberg was married twice, first to Jean K. Talbert in 1940; they had one daughter. After their 1955 divorce, he married Jeanne C. (Whitinger) Hehn in 1957. Hehn had three children from a previous marriage; she died in 1993. He died on January 4, 1997, at age 76, in San Diego, California. His grave is in Riverside National Cemetery.

== See also ==
- National Commanders of the Civil Air Patrol
