= Publius Virgilius Lawson =

American politician

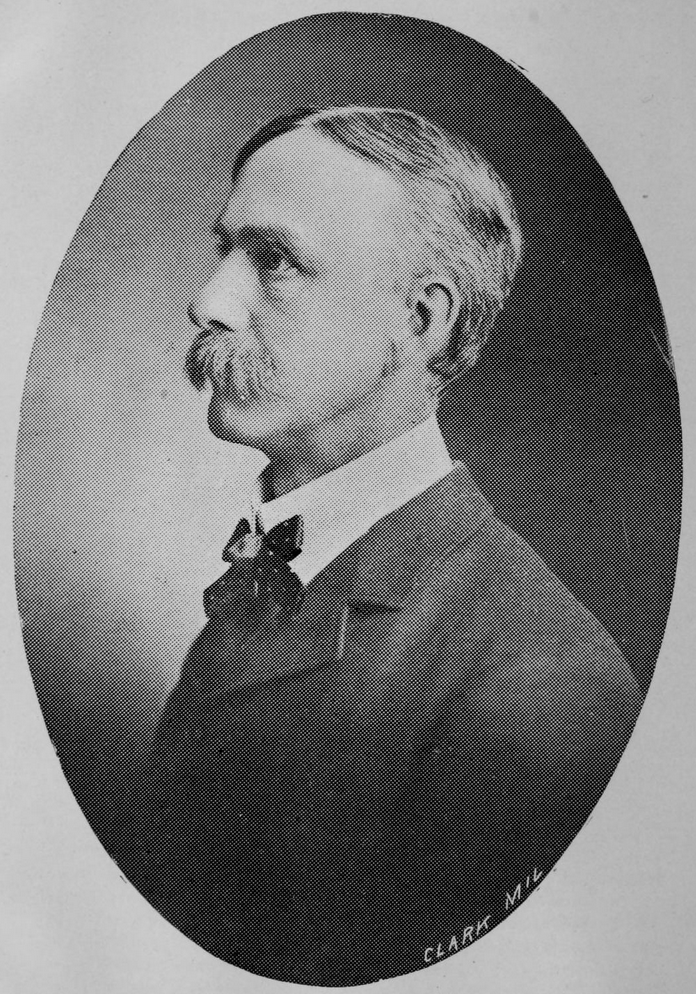
- Born: November 1, 1853; Corning, New York
- Died: December 1, 1920 (aged 67); Menasha, Wisconsin
- Occupations: Lawyer, manufacturer, politician, historian
- Known for: Multiple historical works on the Fox River Valley

Publius Virgilius Lawson (November 1, 1853 – December 1, 1920) was a lawyer, historian, manufacturer and politician from Menasha, Wisconsin.

== Biography ==
Publius Virgilius Lawson was born in Corning, New York on November 1, 1853. His father, Publius Virgilius Lawson Sr, was a carpenter and builder, born in 1825. In 1856 he decided to seek opportunity in Wisconsin. He travelled there first by himself, found work in his trade, and sent for his family in December of that year. In 1858 he founded the P. V. Lawson Company, a manufacturer of doors, sashes, blinds, wagon wheels, and other wagon products. He was involved in organizing the first bank in Menasha, and he was Menasha's first mayor, beginning in 1874. He died in 1881 at the age of 53.

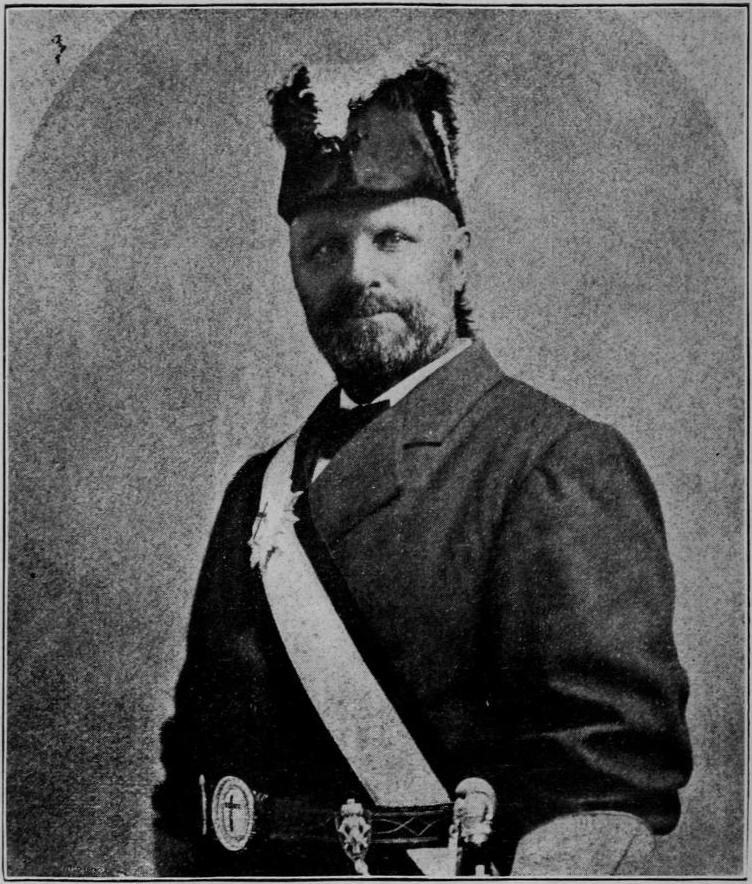
Publius Virgilius Lawson Sr

The son Publius (subject of this article) was educated in the schools of Menasha, and graduated from Menasha High School in 1872. The next year he enrolled at the University of Wisconsin where he was a classmate of Robert M. La Follette. He studied literature and law, and in 1878 received the degree of LLB. While in law school he studied under William F Vilas. By 1877 he was already practicing law on a limited scale in Menasha, which he continued for ten years after graduation.

When his father died, he took over his father's businesses. He refocused these businesses and increased their value, but eventually divested himself of these original businesses. In 1889 he and Wallace Field received three patents for a wooden pulley design, which was manufactured as the Lawson Split Pulley. These were sold all over the United States and in many countries around the world. Lawson also had an interest in a flour mill in Clintonville, but it went out of business, as many mills in Wisconsin did in that period, due to a shift based on an invention by John Stevens in nearby Neenah. Lawson himself wrote the foremost description of Stevens' invention, an account that was very praiseworthy despite the fact that it had a negative effect on a business he owned.

Lawson wrote prolifically on history, focused mostly on the Fox river Valley. His works spanned the time from before the French arrived, through the era of New France, the era of territorial Wisconsin, and up to his contemporary life time. These writings included monographs, books, academic journal articles, and newspaper articles. His magnum opus was The History of Winnebago County.

Lawson was a Republican. He was County Supervisor in 1878, Alderman in 1882–1883, and was a six-term mayor of Menasha: 1886–1889, 1893 and 1896. He ran for State Senator in 1890, but it was traditionally a Democratic district and he was not elected. Lawson served on many other boards and committees that supported museums, libraries, and schools. He was a co-founder of the Wisconsin Archeological Association and president of the Wisconsin Library association from 1901 to 1903.

In 1918, Lawson was elected to the Wisconsin State Assembly replacing William Arnemann who died in office and declined reelection at the end of his term.

On August 5, 1884, Lawson married Florence Josephine Wright. Her parents were I. H. and Rachel Wright. Her uncle was the evangelist Charles Grandison Finney. Publius and Florence had eight children, one of whom died as an infant.

== Additional works by Lawson ==
- Lawson, Publius V (1903). Summary of the Archeology of Winnebago County, Wisconsin. Milwaukee, WI: Wisconsin Archeological Society.
- Lawson, Publius V (1916). Mary Elizabeth Mears: "Nelly Wildwood". Madison, WI: State Historical Society of Wisconsin.
- Lawson, Publius V (1905). Prince or Creole; The Mystery of Louis XVII. Menasha, WI: G Banta Publishing Co.
- Lawson, Publius V (1904). Bravest of the Brave, Captain Charles de Langlade. Menasha, WI: G Banta Publishing Co.
- Lawson, Publius V. Story of Oshkosh, His Tribe and Fellow Chiefs.
