= William Duchman =

American businessman politician (1809–1881)

William Duchman (October 8, 1809 – November 14, 1881) was an American businessman and politician.

Born in Lancaster County, Pennsylvania, Duchman served as register of deeds for Lancaster County and was an aide on the staff of the Governor of Pennsylvania, William F. Johnston. In 1849, Duchman moved to Milwaukee, Wisconsin, and, in 1850, to Menasha, Wisconsin. He was a lumber sawmill operator and a manufacturer of paper. In 1858, Duchman served in the Wisconsin State Assembly and was a Republican. He died in Menasha.
