= John Potter Jr. =

American politician

John Potter Jr. (May 10, 1821 – January 29, 1879) was an American lawyer from Menasha, Wisconsin who was elected to two one-year terms as a Greenback Party member of the Wisconsin State Assembly from Winnebago County but died in office on January 29, 1879.

== Background ==
Potter was born May 10, 1821, in Potters Mills, Pennsylvania, received an academic education at Harrisburg, and became a lawyer. He came to Wisconsin in 1850, and settled in Menasha (the second lawyer ever to live in the new town), where he briefly taught school for an annual salary of $30, became secretary of the newly chartered Masonic lodge, and held various local offices. These included county supervisor; and clerk, trustee and president of the Village Board of Menasha while it was a village, and constable and alderman after it became a city.

== Legislature ==
He was elected in 1877 for the second Assembly district of Winnebago County (cities of Neenah and Menasha; the village of Winneconne; and the Towns of Clayton, Neenah, Menasha, Winchester and Winneconne, with 1,270 votes to 728 for Republican F. T. Moulton. (Republican incumbent Henry Leavens was not a candidate.) He was assigned to the standing committees on the judiciary and on incorporations, chairing the latter.

He was re-elected in 1878, receiving 1,274 votes, to 933 for Republican C. P. Northrop. His committee assignments remained the same, although he lost his chairmanship. He died in Madison during the Assembly session in January 1879, and was succeeded the next year by Democrat A. H. F. Krueger.
