= Silas Bullard =

American judge and politician

Silas Bullard (December 9, 1841 – December 9, 1922) was an American judge and politician.

Born in Greenfield, Massachusetts, Bullard studied at Power's Institute in Bernardston, Massachusetts and Bridgeton Academy. Bullard studied law in Portland, Maine and was admitted to the Maine bar. In 1871, Bullard settled in Menasha, Wisconsin. He was a lawyer and was in the banking and manufacturing businesses. Bullard served as superintendent of the Menasha schools. In 1881 and 1882, Bullard served as mayor of Menasha and also served as Menasha city attorney. Bullard also served on the Winnebago County, Wisconsin Board of Supervisors. From 1885 to 1889, Bullard served as Winnebago County District Attorney and was a Republican. From 1895 to 1899, Bullard served in the Wisconsin State Assembly. Wisconsin Governor James O. Davidson appointed Bullard county judge for Winnebago County to fill the vacancy created by the death of Chester Dwight Cleveland (1839–1910). Bullard died at his home in Menasha, Wisconsin on his 81st birthday.
