= A. D. Eldridge =

American politician

A. D. Eldridge was an American politician. He was a member of the Wisconsin State Assembly.

== Biography ==
Eldridge was born on April 29, 1851, in Menasha, Wisconsin. He would become involved in a number of businesses and work as a merchant.

== Political career ==
Eldridge was elected to the Assembly in 1904. Additionally, he was a member and President of the Neenah, Wisconsin, common council. He was a Republican.
