= George Liberace =

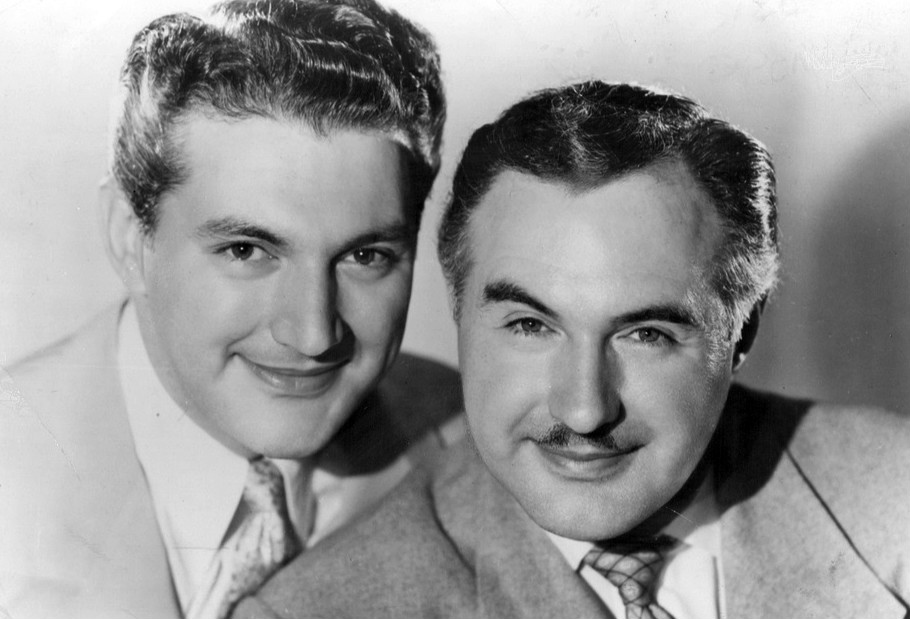
- George Liberace (right) with his brother Liberace in 1953

Background information
- Born: July 31, 1911; Menasha, Wisconsin, US
- Died: October 16, 1983 (aged 72) Las Vegas, Nevada, US
- Occupations: Musician, television performer
- Instrument: Violin
- Label: Imperial Records

George Liberace (July 31, 1911 – October 16, 1983) was an American musician and television performer.

== Biography ==
Born in Menasha, Wisconsin on July 31, 1911, to parents of Italian and Polish origin, George Liberace was the elder brother and business partner of famed entertainer Liberace. He appeared regularly on his brother's syndicated television show in the 1950s as a violin accompanist and orchestral arranger. On occasions when he did not appear, Liberace would often say his catchphrase "I wish my brother George was here".

In the 1960s and 1970s, his name was licensed to George Liberace Songsmiths, Inc., a mail-order music publishing operation of somewhat dubious integrity. On October 5, 1974, a new independent UHF television station, KMUV-TV Channel 31, signed on in Sacramento, California with George Liberace as the station's general manager and on-the-air host. The new station played non-stop movies. However, on May 1, 1976, KMUV abandoned its all-movie format and largely began to air Spanish-language programming, along with some English-language religious programs, with George Liberace resigning his managerial job with the station around this time.

In 1979, he retired from conducting and performing the violin on stage and devoted most of his time to managing the Liberace Museum in Las Vegas, even occasionally giving tours to visitors himself in showing the cars, pianos and costumes and other artefacts owned by his brother. From 1967 until his death, George Liberace was married to Eudora Albrecht. He lived most of his life in Palm Springs, California, in a house owned by his brother.

George Liberace died of leukemia at a hospital in Las Vegas, Nevada on October 16, 1983 at age 72, and was interred in Forest Lawn Memorial Park in the Hollywood Hills.
