= Wisconsin's 49th Assembly district =

American legislative district in southwest Wisconsin

Wisconsin's 49th State Assembly district
- 2024 map defined in 2023 Wisc. Act 94; 2022 map defined in Johnson v. Wisconsin Elections Commission; 2011 map was defined in 2011 Wisc. Act 43
Assemblymember
Travis Tranel; R–Cuba City
since January 3, 2011 (15 years)
- Demographics: 93.49% White; 1.87% Black; 2.0% Hispanic; 0.97% Asian; 1.09% Native American; 0.06% Hawaiian/Pacific Islander
- Population (2020) • Voting age: 59,584; 47,347
- Website: Official website
- Notes: Southwest Wisconsin

Wisconsin's 49th Assembly district is one of 99 districts in the Wisconsin State Assembly. Located in southwest Wisconsin, the district comprises all of Crawford County and most of Grant County. It includes the cities of Boscobel, Fennimore, Lancaster, Platteville, and Prairie du Chien, and the villages of Bagley, Bell Center, Bloomington, Cassville, De Soto, Dickeyville, Eastman, Ferryville, Gays Mills, Lynxville, Mount Hope, Mount Sterling, Patch Grove, Potosi, Soldiers Grove, Steuben, Tennyson, Wauzeka, and Woodman. The district also contains the University of Wisconsin–Platteville campus, Wyalusing State Park, and Nelson Dewey Memorial State Park, and historic landmarks such as the Potosi Brewery and the Grant County Courthouse. The district has been represented by Travis Tranel, a Republican, since January 2011.

The 49th Assembly district is located within Wisconsin's 17th Senate district, along with the 50th and 51st Assembly districts.

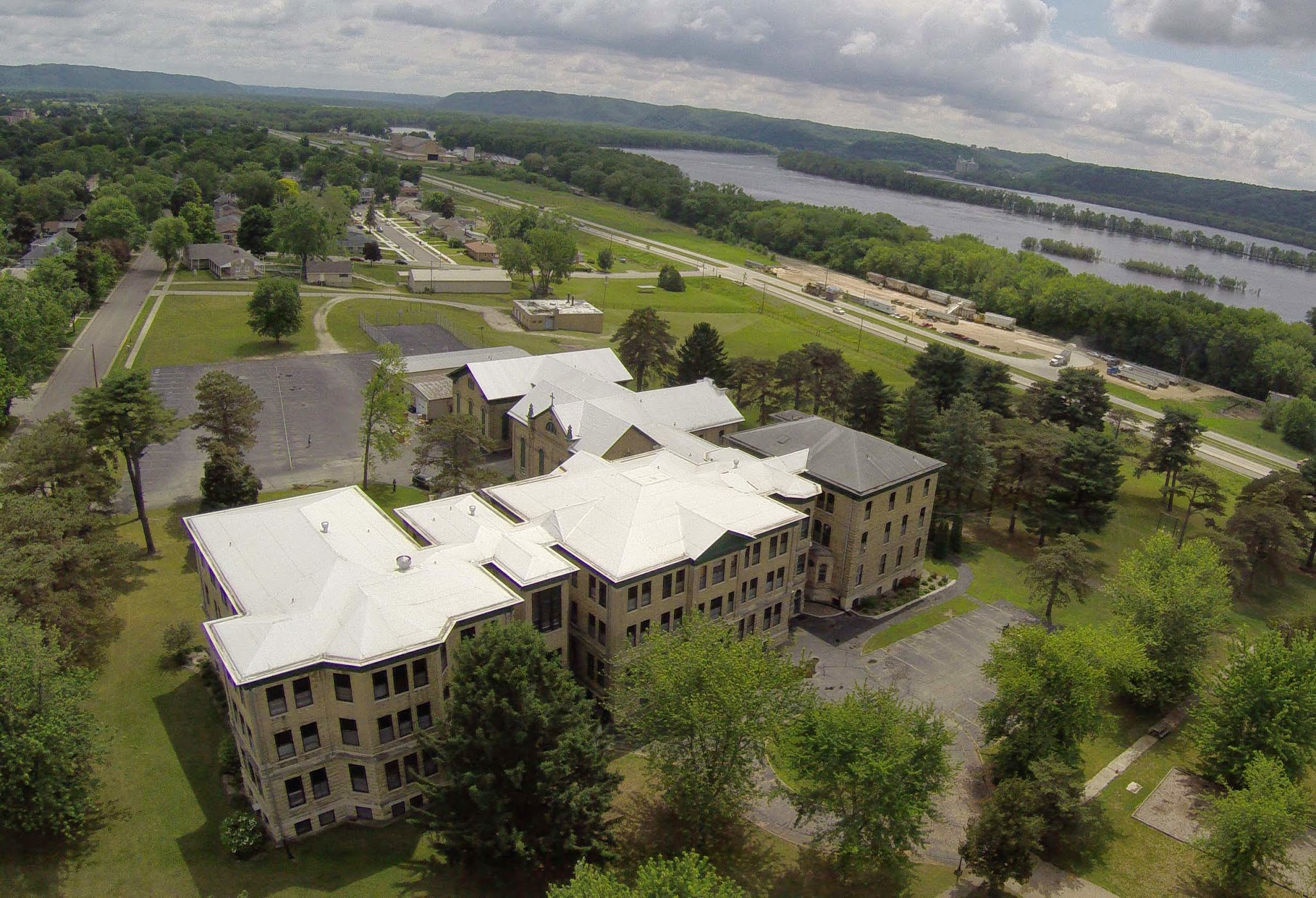
Wyalusing Academy, in Prairie du Chien, with the Mississippi River in the background

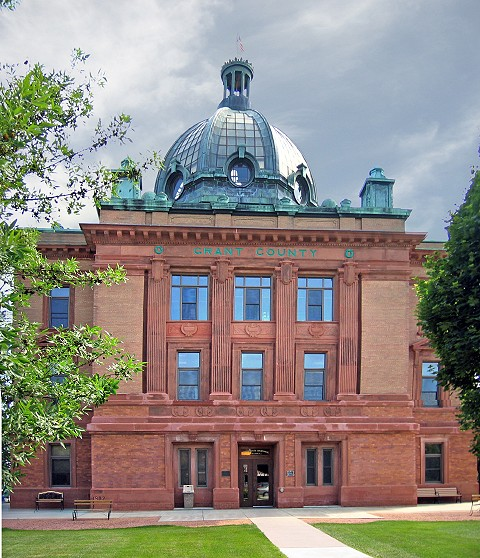
Historic Grant County Courthouse in Lancaster.

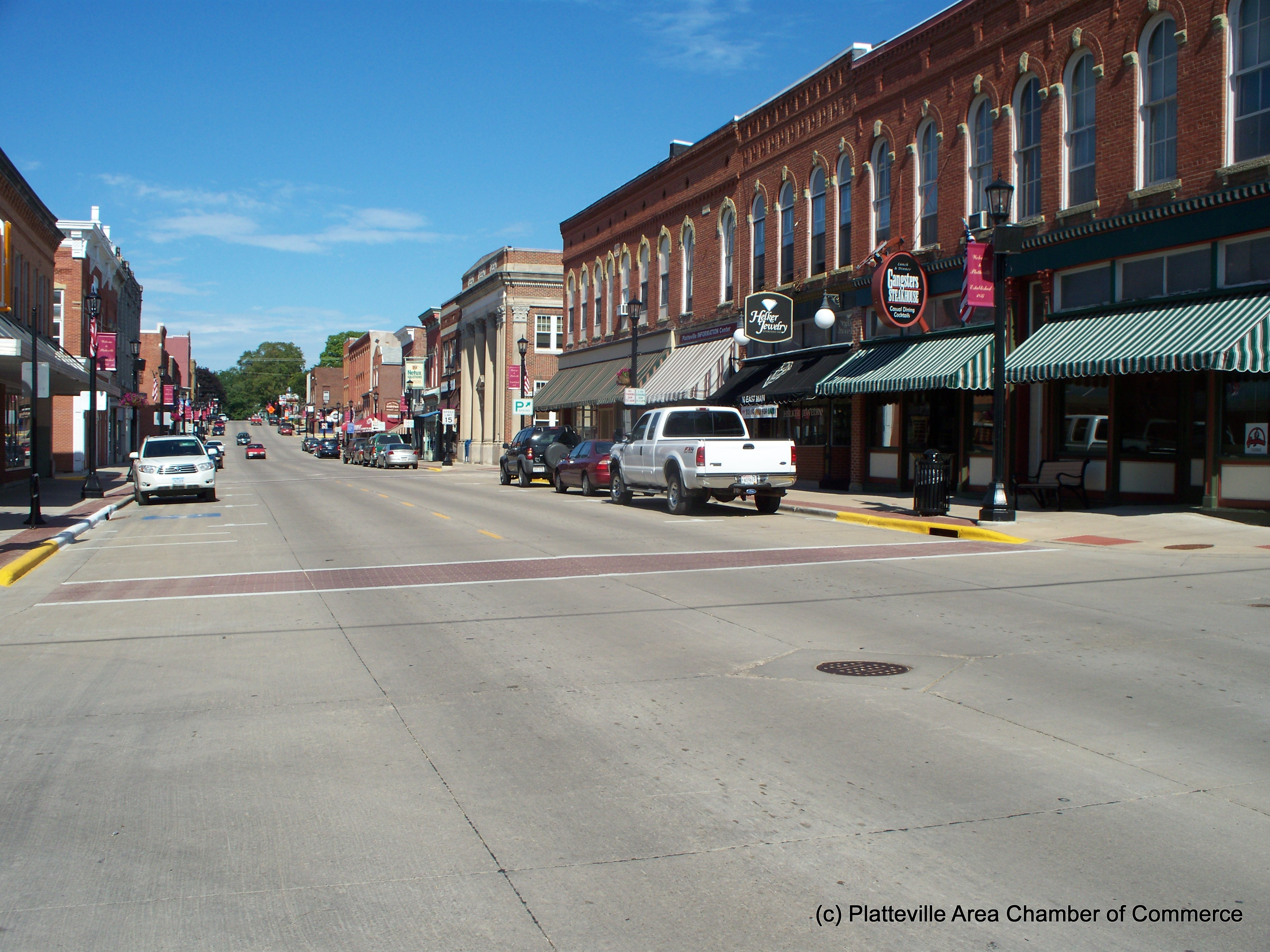
Downtown Platteville.

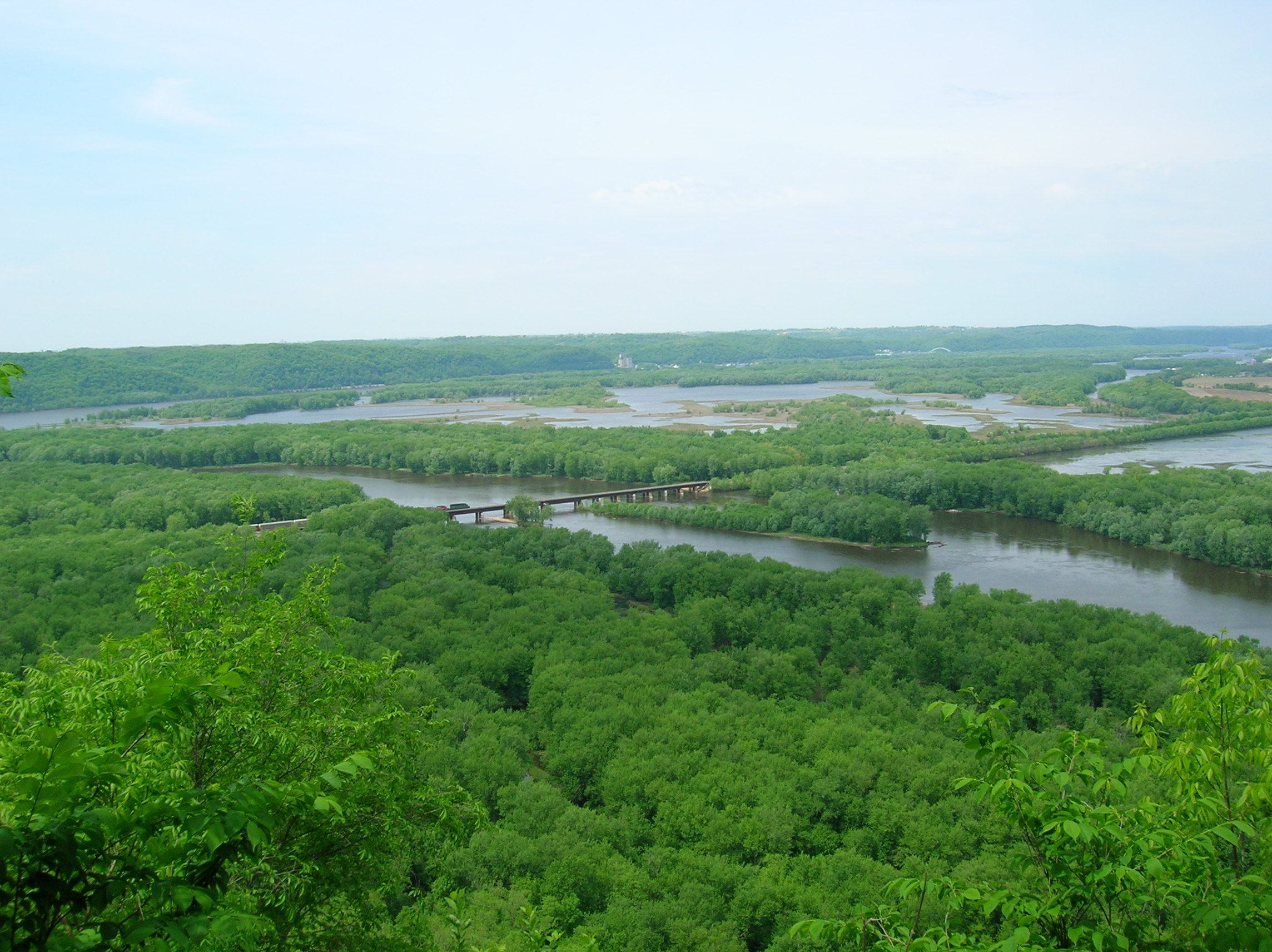
Wyalusing State Park.

== History ==
The district was created in the 1972 redistricting act (1971 Wisc. Act 304) which first established the numbered district system, replacing the previous system which allocated districts to specific counties. Under the pre-1972 districting scheme, Grant County was a single-district county. The 49th district was drawn mostly in line with the former Grant County district, but with several municipalities in the northwest portion of the state removed. The last representative of the Grant County district, James N. Azim Jr., was elected in 1972 as the first representative of the 49th Assembly district.

With the exception of the 1982 court-ordered redistricting plan, which scrambled all State Assembly districts, the 49th district has remained based in Grant County since 1972. The boundaries have varied somewhat, utilizing different combinations of neighboring municipalities in Richland, Iowa, and Lafayette counties.

== List of past representatives ==
List of representatives to the Wisconsin State Assembly from the 49th district
Member	Party	Residence	Counties represented	Term start	Term end	Ref.
District created
James N. Azim Jr.	Rep.	Muscoda	Grant	January 1, 1973	June 14, 1976	
Vacant			Grant	June 14, 1976	January 3, 1977	
Robert S. Travis Jr.	Rep.	Platteville	Grant	January 3, 1977	January 3, 1983	
Robert Jauch	Dem.	Poplar	Bayfield, Douglas	January 3, 1983	January 7, 1985	
Robert S. Travis Jr.	Rep.	Platteville	Grant, Richland	January 7, 1985	January 5, 1987	
David A. Brandemuehl	Rep.	Mount Ida	Grant, Richland	January 5, 1987	January 1, 2001	
David A. Brandemuehl	Rep.	Mount Ida	Grant, Iowa	January 5, 1987	January 1, 2001	
Gabe Loeffelholz	Rep.	Platteville	Grant, Lafayette, Richland	January 1, 2001	January 3, 2007	
Phil Garthwaite	Dem.	Dickeyville	Grant, Lafayette, Richland	January 3, 2007	January 3, 2011	
Travis Tranel	Rep.	Cuba City	Grant, Lafayette, Richland	January 3, 2011	January 6, 2025	
Travis Tranel	Rep.	Cuba City	Grant, Crawford	January 6, 2025	Current	
