= Gary Goldberg =

Gary Goldberg may refer to:

- Gary David Goldberg (1944–2013), American writer and producer for television and film
- Gary J. Goldberg, mining industry executive
