= James N. Azim Jr. =

American politician (1936–1976)

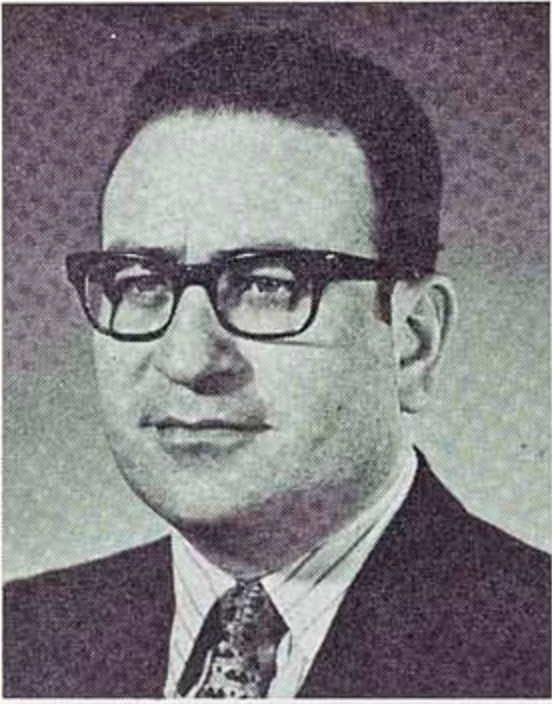

Member of the Wisconsin State Assembly
- In office January 1, 1973 – June 14, 1976
- Preceded by: District established
- Succeeded by: Robert S. Travis Jr.
- Constituency: 49th district
- In office April 13, 1964 – January 1, 1973
- Preceded by: Hugh A. Harper
- Succeeded by: District abolished
- Constituency: Grant County district

Personal details
- Born: January 17, 1936 Richland Center, Wisconsin, US
- Died: June 14, 1976 (aged 40) Rochester, Minnesota, US
- Resting place: Saint Johns Cemetery, Muscoda, Wisconsin
- Party: Republican
- Spouse: Elizabeth "Betty" Nalepinski (m. 1958–1976)
- Children: 3
- Education: University of Wisconsin–Platteville (B.S.); University of Wisconsin–Madison (LL.B.)

James N. Azim Jr. (January 17, 1936 – June 14, 1976) was an American attorney and Republican politician. He was a member of the Wisconsin State Assembly, representing Grant County from 1964 until his death in 1976.

== Early life and education ==
Azim was born in Richland Center, Wisconsin, in Richland County. During his childhood, he moved with his family to Muscoda, Wisconsin, and graduated from Muscoda's St. John's High School. He attended St. Thomas College in Saint Paul, Minnesota, but did not earn a degree there. He continued his education at Wisconsin State College–Platteville, where he received his bachelor's degree in 1957. After completing his undergraduate education, he worked briefly as an assistant in the history department at Marquette University, before returning to Muscoda, where he taught history at Muscoda High School.

== Political career ==
While attending college at Platteville, Azim had become involved with the Young Republicans and became a passionate member of the Republican Party of Wisconsin. A year after completing his undergraduate degree, in 1958, Azim made his first attempt at elected office when he launched a primary challenge against long-time Republican incumbent State Representative Hugh A. Harper. Despite a vigorous campaign, the 22-year-old Azim came in a distant third behind Harper and challenger William A. Loy, of Fennimore. He remained actively involved in politics, and was active in the 1960 congressional campaign of Vernon Wallace Thomson.

In 1961, he was elected to a seat on Muscoda Village Board. The next year, he launched another campaign for State Assembly, again challenging incumbent Hugh Harper in the Republican primary. Although he was defeated again, this time he came within 5% of Harper. Following the 1962 election, Azim went to Madison to attend the University of Wisconsin Law School and, while there, worked as a legislative assistant in the Assembly. When Harper died unexpectedly in 1963, Azim announced he would make another attempt at election to the Assembly. On his third attempt for State Assembly, Azim was finally victorious. He took 63% in the Republican primary and 62% in the April special election.

Azim was reelected to a full term in November 1964, and completed his law degree in the spring of 1965. He was subsequently reelected three more times in the Grant County Assembly district and two more times in the 49th Assembly district after the 1972 redistricting. In the Assembly, he was known as a moderate, outspoken against both the Republican and Democratic majorities at different times in his career.

== Personal life and family ==
Azim married Elizabeth "Betty" Nalepinski, April 26, 1958, at St. John's Catholic Church in Muscoda. They had three children together before his death in 1976.

Azim suffered kidney failure in 1973, and required dialysis three times a week. Inspired by his personal difficulties, he was an author of legislation in 1974 which authorized the state Medicaid program to fund dialysis treatments. After three years of dialysis, early on the morning of May 16, 1976, Azim received word from the Mayo Clinic that a compatible kidney was available for transplantation. He and his wife immediately drove to Minnesota, and the transplant took place at 10am that morning. Azim suffered complications from the surgery and required two additional surgeries to correct digestive problems. Azim's condition continued to deteriorate, and, after 30 days in the hospital, he died. He is buried in St. Johns Cemetery in Muscoda, Wisconsin.

Wisconsin State Assembly
Preceded by Hugh A. Harper	Member of the Wisconsin State Assembly from the Grant district April 13, 1964 – January 1, 1973	District abolished
New district	Member of the Wisconsin State Assembly from the 49th district January 1, 1973 – June 14, 1976	Succeeded by Robert S. Travis Jr.
