= Mark Hirsch =

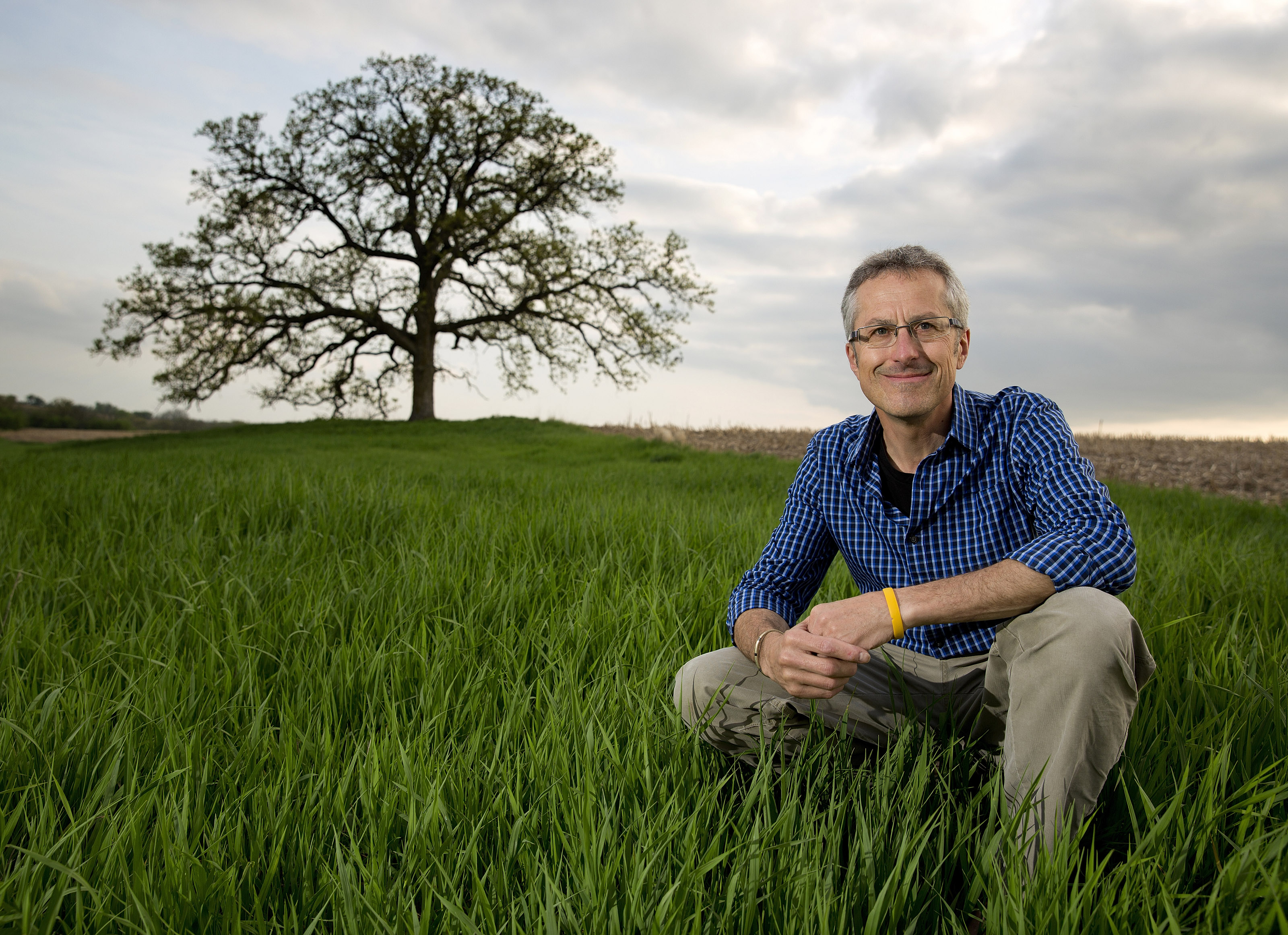
- Born: October 8, 1960 (age 65); Platteville, Wisconsin, U.S.
- Education: University of Wisconsin Platteville
- Occupations: Photographer and publisher
- Website: http://www.thattree.net/

Mark Hirsch is an American photographer and publisher based in Platteville, Wisconsin. Hirsch is known for publishing the book That Tree, a journal and photo history of the life of an ancient bur oak tree in a farm field in southwest Wisconsin. Every photograph in the book was taken with an iPhone 4s. Hirsch's work has been featured on multiple national and international news sources, including NPR and CBS Sunday Morning.

== Works ==
- Featured artist ((Voices Gallery))
- Honored and recognized by ((American Grove)), 2015 ((Great American Tree))
