= Bert A. Clemens =

American politician

Bert A. Clemens (August 15, 1874 – February 2, 1935) was an American farmer, businessman, and politician.

Born in Cuba City, Wisconsin, Clemens went to business school. He was a farmer. Clemens became involved with real estate and insurance in 1926. From 1933 until his death in 1935, Clemens served in the Wisconsin State Assembly and was a Republican. Clemens died of pneumonia at his home shortly after starting his second term in the Wisconsin State Assembly.
