= Cobb, Wisconsin =

- Village
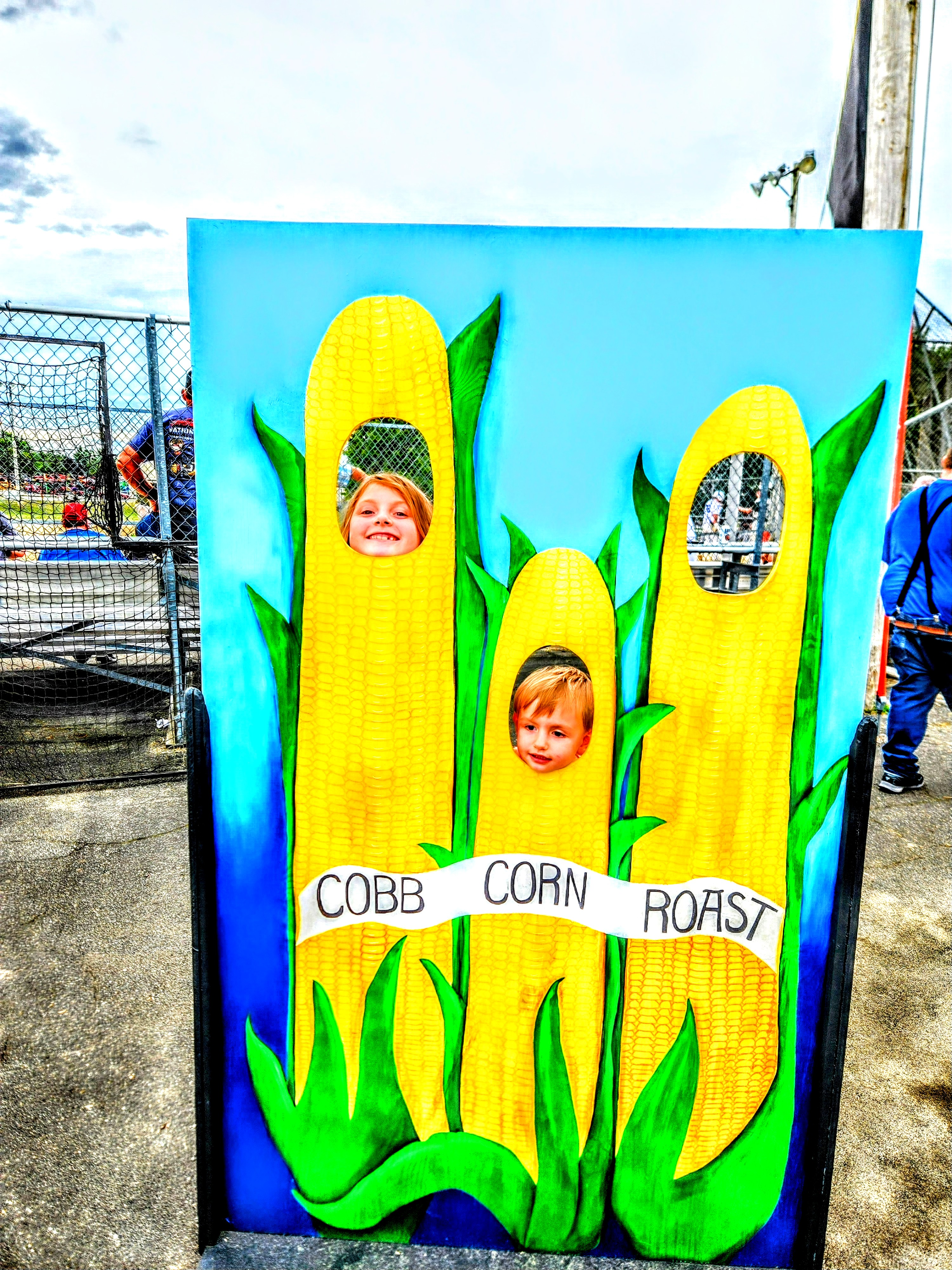
- Cobb Wisconsin Corn Festival [Corn Festival]

- Location of Cobb in Iowa County, Wisconsin.
- Coordinates: 42°58′1″N 90°19′52″W
- Country: United States
- State: Wisconsin
- County: Iowa

Area
  - Total: 0.89 sq mi (2.31 km^{2})
  - Land: 0.89 sq mi (2.31 km^{2})
  - Water: 0 sq mi (0.00 km^{2})
- Elevation: 1,171 ft (357 m)

Population (2020)
  - Total: 480
  - Density: 540/sq mi (210/km^{2})
- Time zone: UTC-6 (Central (CST))
  - Summer (DST): UTC-5 (CDT)
- Area code: 608
- FIPS code: 55-15975
- GNIS feature ID: 1563218
- Website: www.villageofcobb.com

Cobb is a village in Iowa County, Wisconsin, United States. The population was 480 at the 2020 census. It is part of the Madison Metropolitan Statistical Area.

== History ==
A post office called Cobb has been in operation since 1863. The village was named for Amasa Cobb, a member of the United States House of Representatives from Wisconsin.

== Geography ==
Cobb is located at 42°58′1″N 90°19′52″W (42.966873, −90.331150).

According to the United States Census Bureau, the village has a total area of 0.83 square miles (2.15 km^{2}), all land.

== Demographics ==
Historical population
Census	Pop.	Note	%±
1910	230		—
1920	230		0.0%
1930	276		20.0%
1940	276		0.0%
1950	284		2.9%
1960	387		36.3%
1970	410		5.9%
1980	409		−0.2%
1990	440		7.6%
2000	442		0.5%
2010	458		3.6%
2020	480		4.8%
U.S. Decennial Census

=== 2010 census ===
As of the census of 2010, there were 458 people, 199 households, and 126 families living in the village. The population density was 551.8 inhabitants per square mile (213.1/km^{2}). There were 210 housing units at an average density of 253.0 per square mile (97.7/km^{2}). The racial makeup of the village was 98.3% White, 1.1% Asian, and 0.7% from other races. Hispanic or Latino of any race were 0.2% of the population.

There were 199 households, of which 29.6% had children under the age of 18 living with them, 50.3% were married couples living together, 7.0% had a female householder with no husband present, 6.0% had a male householder with no wife present, and 36.7% were non-families. 29.1% of all households were made up of individuals, and 11.5% had someone living alone who was 65 years of age or older. The average household size was 2.30 and the average family size was 2.81.

The median age in the village was 41.1 years. 22.7% of residents were under the age of 18; 7.8% were between the ages of 18 and 24; 27.2% were from 25 to 44; 25.8% were from 45 to 64; and 16.6% were 65 years of age or older. The gender makeup of the village was 49.8% male and 50.2% female.

=== 2000 census ===
As of the census of 2000, there were 442 people, 188 households, and 121 families living in the village. The population density was 491.7 people per square mile (189.6/km^{2}). There were 199 housing units at an average density of 221.4 per square mile (85.4/km^{2}). The racial makeup of the village was 99.32% White, 0.45% Native American, and 0.23% from two or more races. Hispanic or Latino of any race were 0.45% of the population.

There were 188 households, out of which 30.9% had children under the age of 18 living with them, 58.5% were married couples living together, 4.3% had a female householder with no husband present, and 35.6% were non-families. 31.4% of all households were made up of individuals, and 14.4% had someone living alone who was 65 years of age or older. The average household size was 2.35 and the average family size was 3.02.

In the village, the population was spread out, with 25.6% under the age of 18, 7.5% from 18 to 24, 27.4% from 25 to 44, 19.7% from 45 to 64, and 19.9% who were 65 years of age or older. The median age was 38 years. For every 100 females, there were 111.5 males. For every 100 females age 18 and over, there were 103.1 males.

The median income for a household in the village was $34,531, and the median income for a family was $40,278. Males had a median income of $32,143 versus $21,838 for females. The per capita income for the village was $18,815. About 2.2% of families and 4.2% of the population were below the poverty line, including 4.7% of those under age 18 and 7.9% of those age 65 or over.

== Cobb Corn Roast ==
The Cobb Corn Boil takes place annually in August at Shepherd Park. Sponsored by the town itself, the centerpiece event is exactly what the name suggests: free corn-on-the-cob prepared and served in large quantities with BBQ chicken on an open pit grill. There are car shows, bands, beer, and softball tournaments.

== Notable people ==
- Greg Gard, University of Wisconsin–Madison men's head basketball coach
- William H. Goldthorpe, newspaper editor and Wisconsin State Representative, was born in Cobb.
- Todd Novak, Representative 51st Assembly District & Mayor of Dodgeville

== Images ==
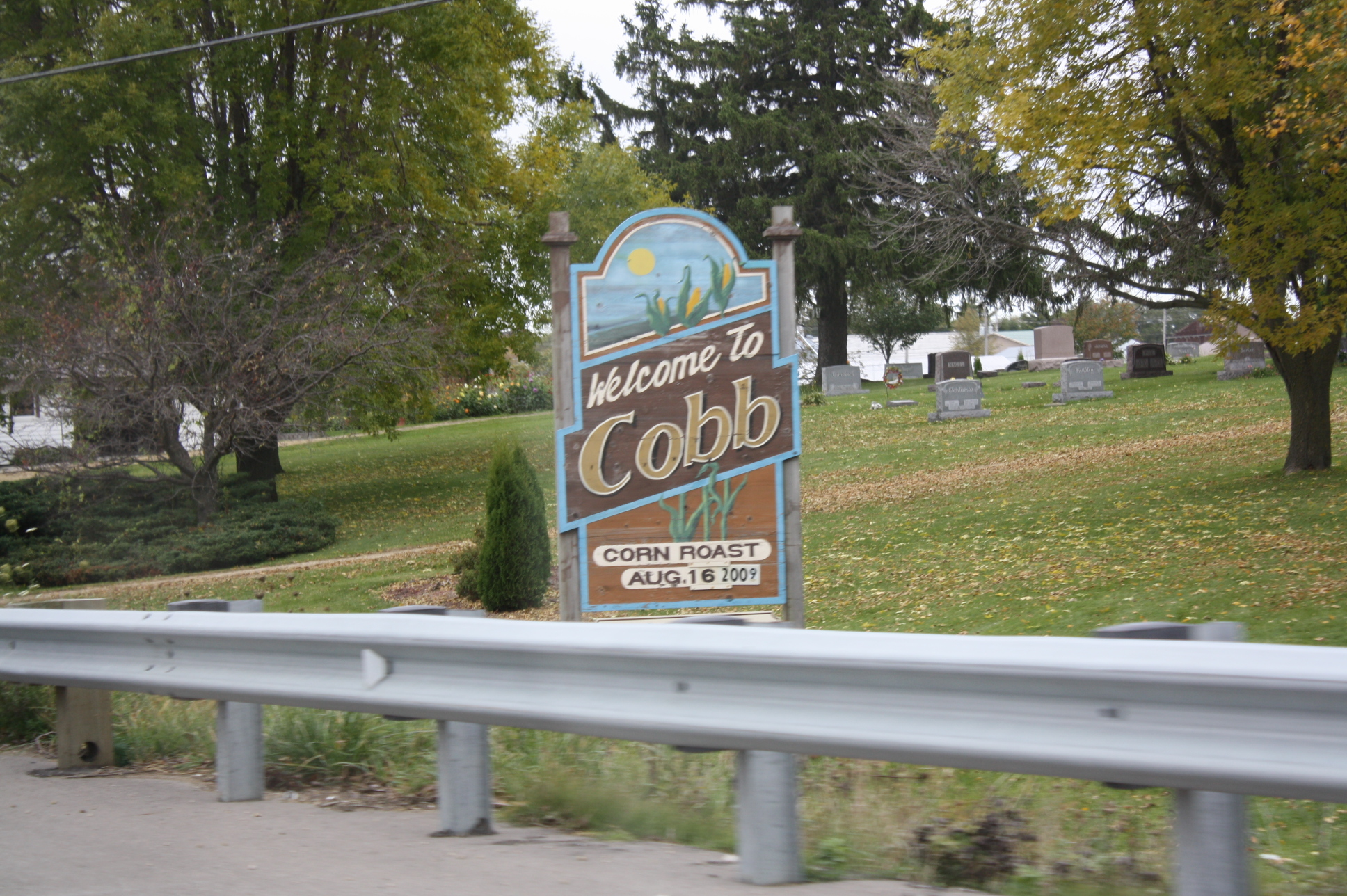
Welcome sign

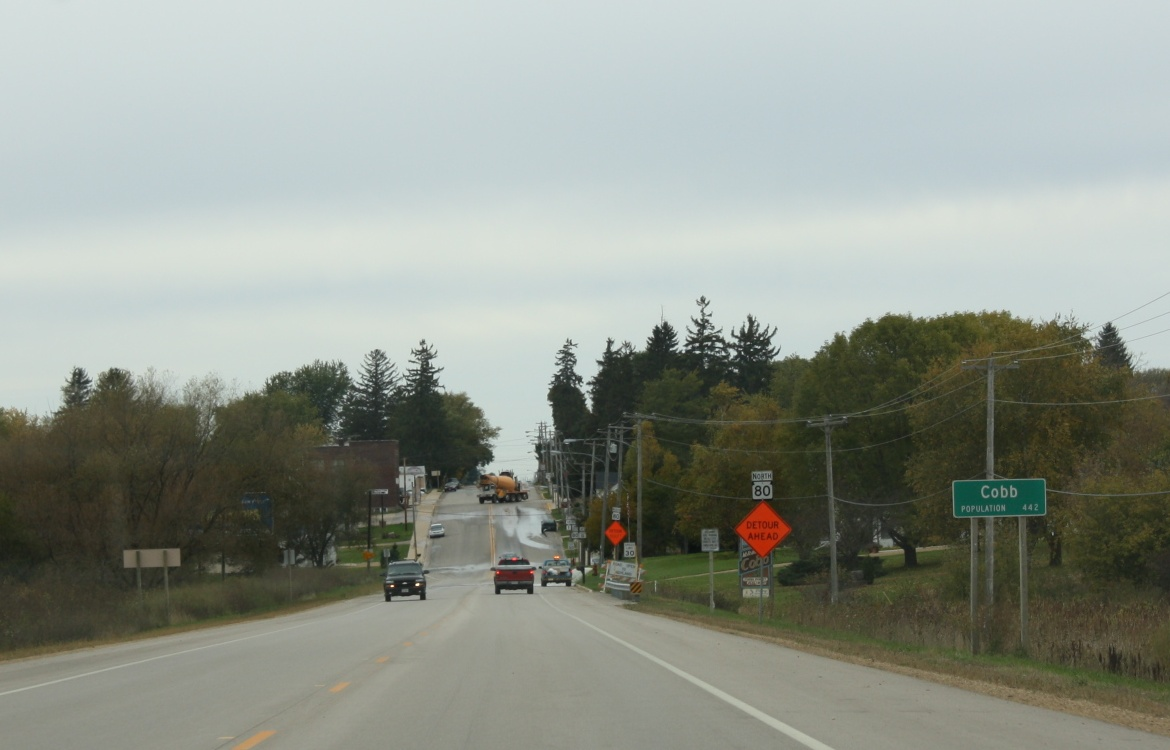
Looking east at Cobb

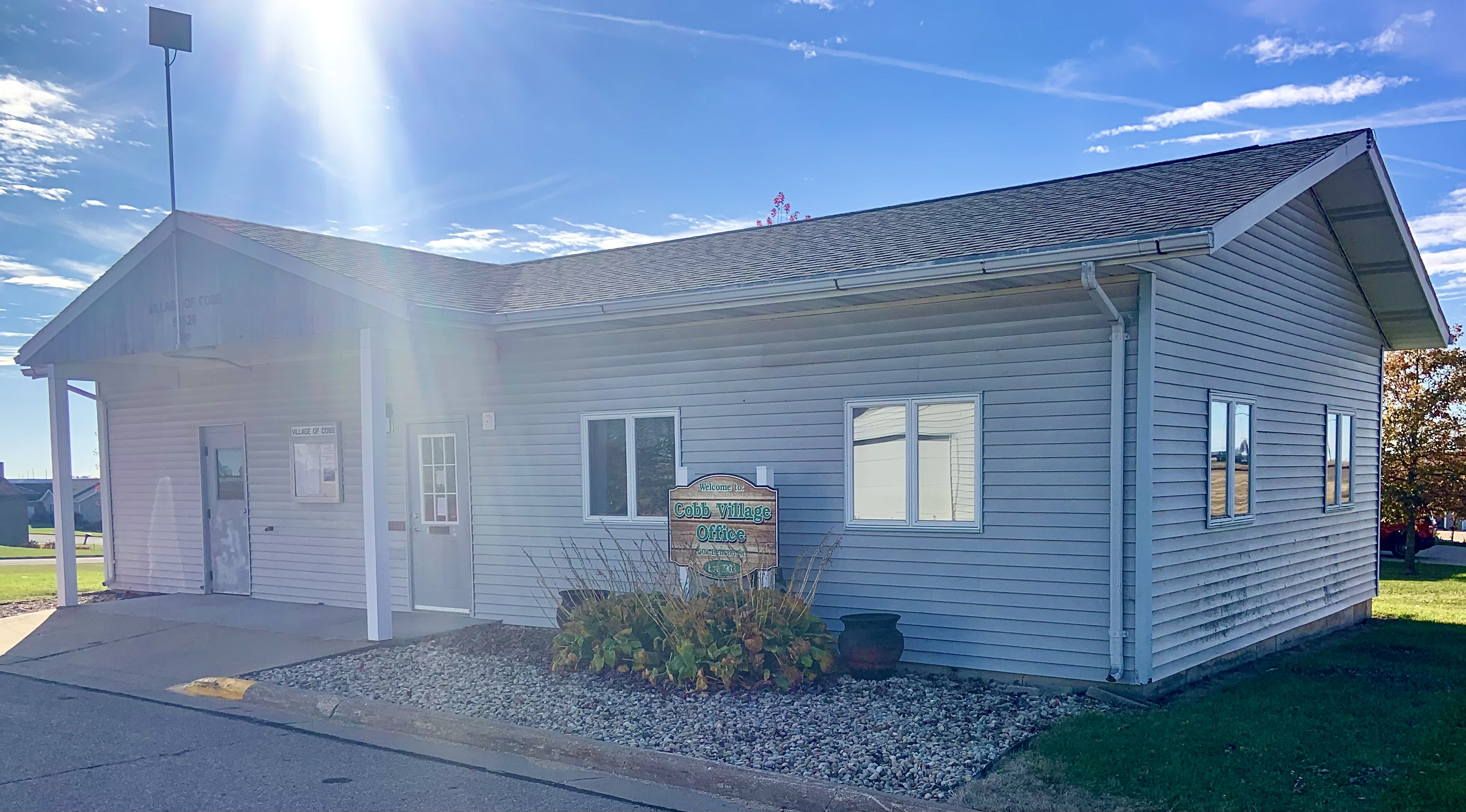
Cobb Village Hall
