= William H. Goldthorpe =

American newspaper publisher, postmaster, and politician

William Goldthorpe
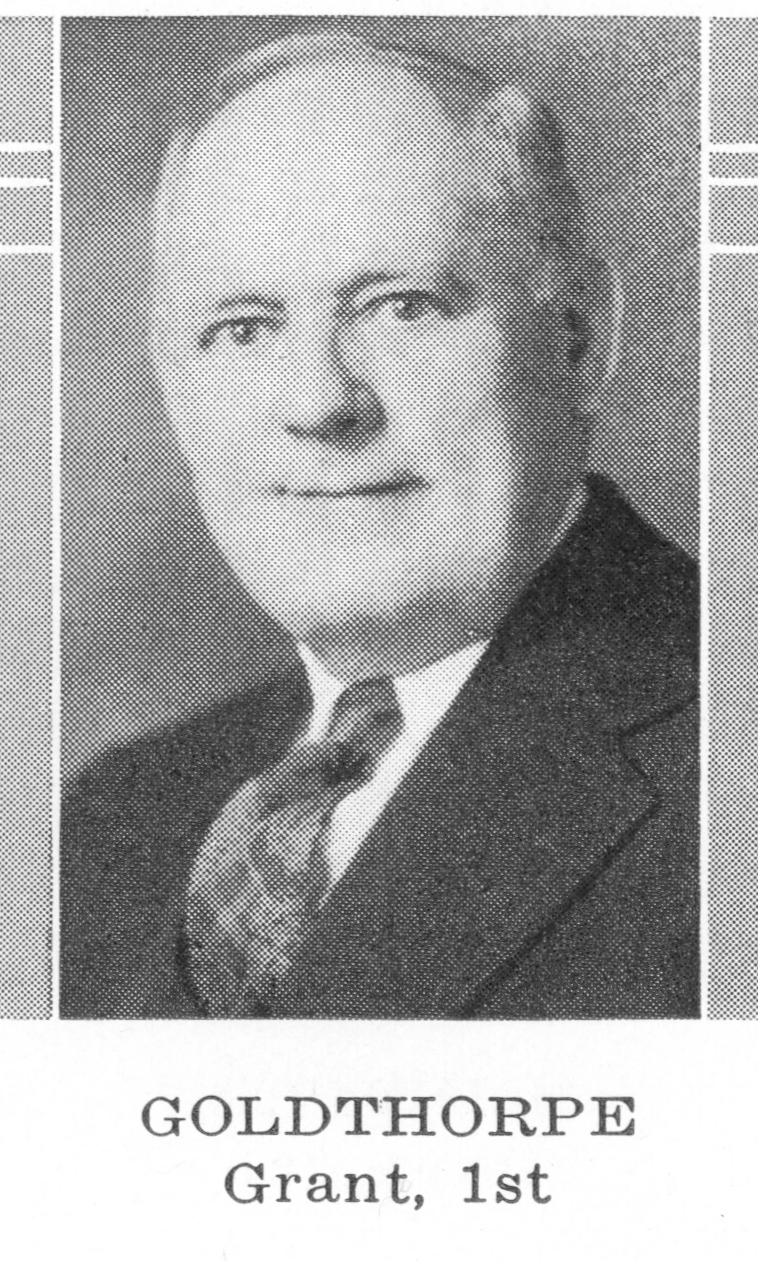

Member of the Wisconsin State Assembly
- In office 1935–1946

Personal details
- Born: September 25, 1880 Cobb, Wisconsin
- Died: June 1, 1964 (aged 83) Cuba City, Wisconsin
- Party: Republican
- Education: University of Wisconsin–Platteville

William H. Goldthorpe (September 25, 1880 – June 1, 1964) was an American newspaper publisher, postmaster, and politician who served as a member of the Wisconsin State Assembly.

== Biography ==
Goldthorpe was born on September 25, 1880, in Cobb, Wisconsin. He graduated from the University of Wisconsin–Platteville in 1900. During his time there, he organized the school band. Goldthorpe was a publisher of the Tri-Country Press and was president of the board of education.

Goldthorpe was a member of the Wisconsin State Assembly from 1935 to 1946. Additionally, he served as the postmaster of Cuba City, Wisconsin. He was a Republican.

He died on June 1, 1964, in Cuba City, Wisconsin.
