= Elmer Lloyd Rundell =

American politician

Elmer Lloyd Rundell (September 15, 1879 – October 20, 1968) was a member of the Wisconsin State Assembly.

== Early life ==
Rundell was born in Livingston, Wisconsin, the son of Albert and Nancy (née Fruit) Rundell. Rundell graduated from the University of Wisconsin-Platteville.

== Career ==
Rundell was first elected to the Assembly in 1940. He was a Republican.
