= WSUP =

Radio station in Platteville, Wisconsin

Coordinates: 42.733°N 90.486°W

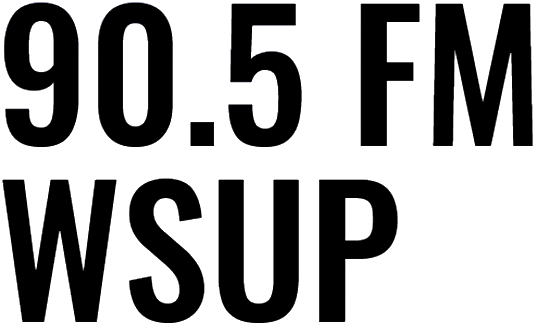
- United States
- Broadcast area: Platteville, WI
- Frequency: 90.5 MHz
- Branding: The Evolution 90.5FM

Programming
- Format: Classic rock, Alternative rock

Ownership
- Owner: University of Wisconsin System

History
- First air date: 1964; 62 years ago
- Call sign meaning: Wisconsin State University Platteville

Technical information
- Licensing authority: FCC
- Class: A
- ERP: 1,000 watts
- HAAT: 45 meters

Links
- Public license information: Public file; LMS
- Webcast: Listen Live 24/7
- Website: wsup.us

WSUP is a university-run radio station located in Platteville, Wisconsin. It is run by an all-volunteer student body at University of Wisconsin-Platteville.

WSUP is the oldest student-operated radio station in the UW System, originating in 1964, when the university was Wisconsin State University-Platteville (hence the call letters). The station is licensed to the Wisconsin State Board of Regents and is administered by the University of Wisconsin System.

WSUP operates on an assigned frequency of 90.5 MHz with an effective radiated power of 1,000 watts. Studios and transmitter for WSUP are located in Pioneer Tower on the campus of the University of Wisconsin-Platteville.

The mission of WSUP is two-fold, as identified by the Board of Regents: to provide a valuable on-site practicum for university instruction through practical experience to students; and, to act in a service and outreach capacity for the university to the campus community and to the city of license.

On February 1, 2006, WSUP launched a live web stream of their programming. This was disabled temporarily for legal reasons regarding the playing of copyrighted music in 2008. WSUP still continued to webcast many of their UWP athletic events. As of March 1, 2010, WSUP has once again begun to stream all of its content 24/7 for all of its listeners around the world.

WSUP went off air in the summer of 2020 because of technical difficulties. As of September 2020, it is back on air.
