= Cuba City, Wisconsin =

- City
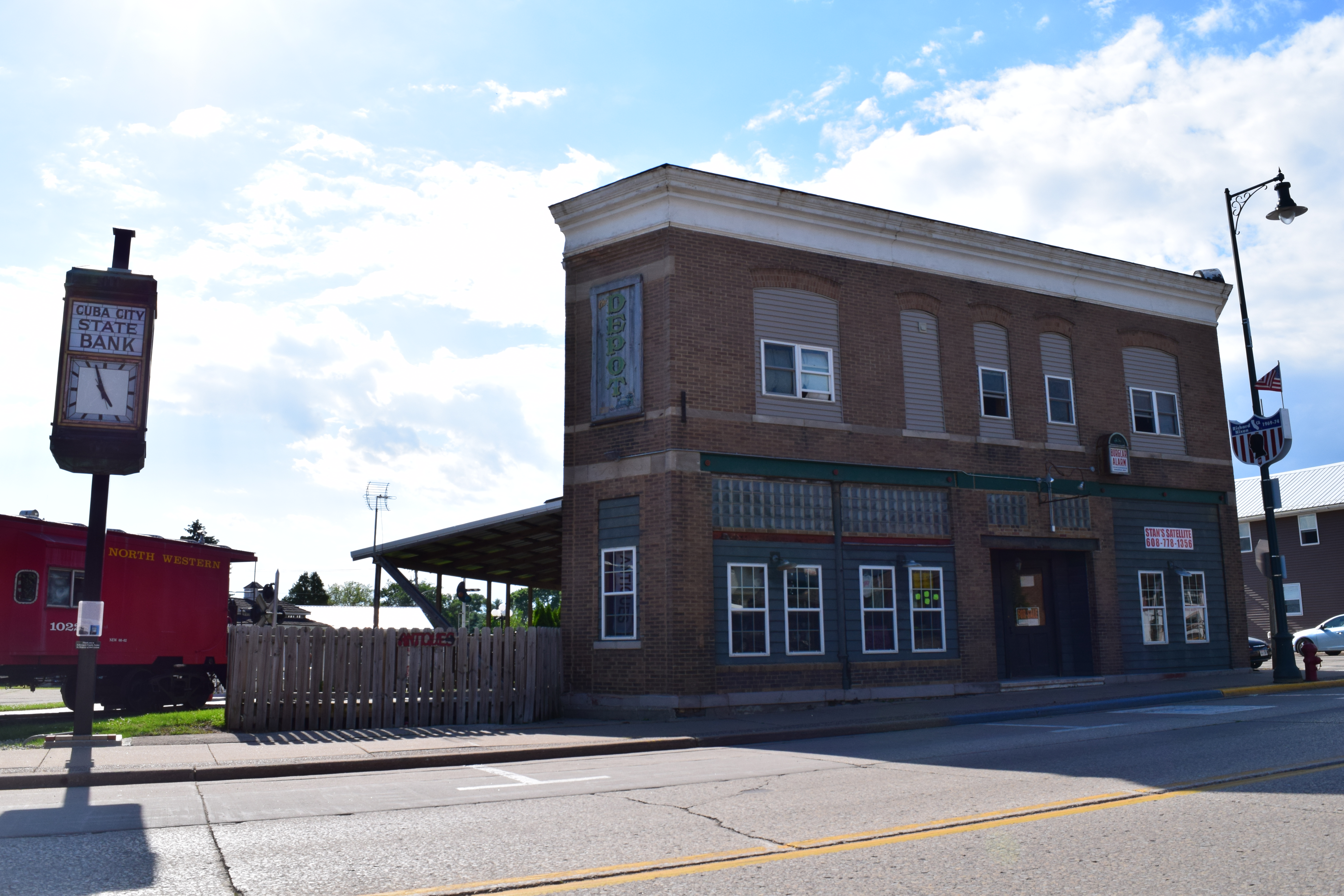
- Former Cuba City State Bank and Post Office
- Motto: "The City of Presidents"
- Location of Cuba City in Grant County, Wisconsin.

- Location within Wisconsin Location within the United States
- Coordinates: 42°36′21″N 90°25′49″W
- Country: United States
- State: Wisconsin
- Counties: Grant, Lafayette

Area
  - Total: 1.16 sq mi (3.00 km^{2})
  - Land: 1.16 sq mi (3.00 km^{2})
  - Water: 0 sq mi (0.00 km^{2})
- Elevation: 1,010 ft (308 m)

Population (2020)
  - Total: 2,138
  - Density: 1,850/sq mi (713/km^{2})
- Time zone: UTC-6 (Central (CST))
  - Summer (DST): UTC-5 (CDT)
- Zip Code: 53807
- Area code: 608
- FIPS code: 55-17950
- GNIS feature ID: 1563606
- Website: cubacity.org

Cuba City is a city in Grant and Lafayette counties in the U.S. state of Wisconsin. The population was 2,138 at the 2020 census. Of this, 1,890 were in Grant County, and 248 were in Lafayette County. The city is nicknamed "The City of Presidents" because of the presidential banners displayed along the city's Main Street.

== History ==
The history of the city began in 1836, when John Amie Merle and Mathais Comstock purchased 160 acres (65 ha) of land from the American Government in Grant County. The first structure in the community was erected in 1846 by Jack Deboard. Deboard is considered the first settler in Cuba City.

The name "Yuba City" was finally picked after a dispute about the name of the new village, but after discovering another location had already been given that name, a new name, "Cuba City," was selected.

The community incorporated as a village in Grant County only in 1894. The village incorporated as a city in 1925 and annexed into Lafayette County between 1960 and 1970.

== Geography ==
Cuba City is located at 42°36′21″N 90°25′49″W (42.605874, -90.430274).

According to the United States Census Bureau, the city has a total area of 1.08 square miles (2.80 km^{2}), all land. Most of the city lies in Grant County, with only a small portion in Lafayette County.

The community is located on State Highway 80.

== Education ==
Cuba City is notable in terms of education because of its high school, Cuba City High School. Though the school is small in terms of attendance (250-300 students), it stands out in its academic and athletic performance. In 2007, it won a National Blue Ribbon Award from the National Blue Ribbon Schools Program. The Cuba City Varsity Women's Basketball team has qualified for and won the Wisconsin Interscholastic Athletic Association's state basketball tournament more times than any other team since the tournament began in 1976. Though its Women's Basketball team is its most successful, its Wrestling team and Track & Field team has also been somewhat successful at the state level.

Students that attend Cuba City High School matriculate from Cuba City Middle School, St. Rose of Lima Catholic School in Cuba City (serving grades K-8), and Immaculate Conception in Kieler, Wisconsin (serving grades 4-8).

Cuba City Elementary School (serving grades K-5) and Cuba City Middle School (serving grades 6-8) are located in the same building just north of the High School. As the building housing the schools is a circle, it is often affectionately called "The Round School".

== Demographics ==
Historical population
Census	Pop.	Note	%±
1880	48		—
1900	636		—
1910	967		52.0%
1920	1,175		21.5%
1930	1,157		−1.5%
1940	1,259		8.8%
1950	1,333		5.9%
1960	1,673		25.5%
1970	1,993		19.1%
1980	2,129		6.8%
1990	2,024		−4.9%
2000	2,156		6.5%
2010	2,086		−3.2%
2020	2,138		2.5%
U.S. Decennial Census

=== 2010 census ===
As of the census of 2010, there were 2,086 people, 847 households, and 537 families living in the city. The population density was 1,931.5 inhabitants per square mile (745.8/km^{2}). There were 899 housing units at an average density of 832.4 per square mile (321.4/km^{2}). The racial makeup of the city was 99.1% White, 0.2% African American, 0.1% Native American, 0.1% Asian, and 0.5% from two or more races. Hispanic or Latino of any race were 0.5% of the population.

There were 847 households, of which 29.0% had children under the age of 18 living with them, 51.0% were married couples living together, 7.8% had a female householder with no husband present, 4.6% had a male householder with no wife present, and 36.6% were non-families. 29.4% of all households were made up of individuals, and 15.4% had someone living alone who was 65 years of age or older. The average household size was 2.36 and the average family size was 2.95.

The median age in the city was 40.9 years. 23.1% of residents were under the age of 18; 8.4% were between the ages of 18 and 24; 23.4% were from 25 to 44; 23.1% were from 45 to 64; and 21.9% were 65 years of age or older. The gender makeup of the city was 48.6% male and 51.4% female.

=== 2000 census ===
As of the census of 2000, there were 2,156 people, 861 households, and 569 families living in the city. The population density was 1,997.1 people per square mile (770.8/km^{2}). There were 900 housing units at an average density of 833.7 per square mile (321.8/km^{2}). The racial makeup of the city was 99.49% White, 0.05% Native American, 0.23% Asian, and 0.23% from two or more races. Hispanic or Latino of any race were 0.09% of the population.

There were 861 households, out of which 30.7% had children under the age of 18 living with them, 56.1% were married couples living together, 6.7% had a female householder with no husband present, and 33.9% were non-families. 29.7% of all households were made up of individuals, and 15.4% had someone living alone who was 65 years of age or older. The average household size was 2.39 and the average family size was 2.98.

In the city, the population was spread out, with 24.1% under the age of 18, 7.7% from 18 to 24, 25.6% from 25 to 44, 21.0% from 45 to 64, and 21.7% who were 65 years of age or older. The median age was 40 years. For every 100 females, there were 94.4 males. For every 100 females age 18 and over, there were 88.7 males.

The median income for a household in the city was $38,750, and the median income for a family was $46,550. Males had a median income of $30,884 versus $21,359 for females. The per capita income for the city was $19,375. About 5.9% of families and 8.8% of the population were below the poverty line, including 17.8% of those under age 18 and 4.3% of those age 65 or over.

== Notable people ==
- Travis Tranel, Wisconsin State Representative
- Bert A. Clemens, Wisconsin State Representative, was born in Cuba City.
- Judd Conlon, music arranger for Walt Disney, was born in Cuba City.
- William H. Goldthorpe, Wisconsin state representative, was postmaster of Cuba City.
- Chuck Harris, NFL player, was born in Cuba City.
- Sherman E. Smalley, Wisconsin State Representative and jurist, lived in Cuba City.
- Robert S. Travis, Jr., Wisconsin State Representative, was born in Cuba City.
