= Phil Garthwaite =

American politician (born 1972)

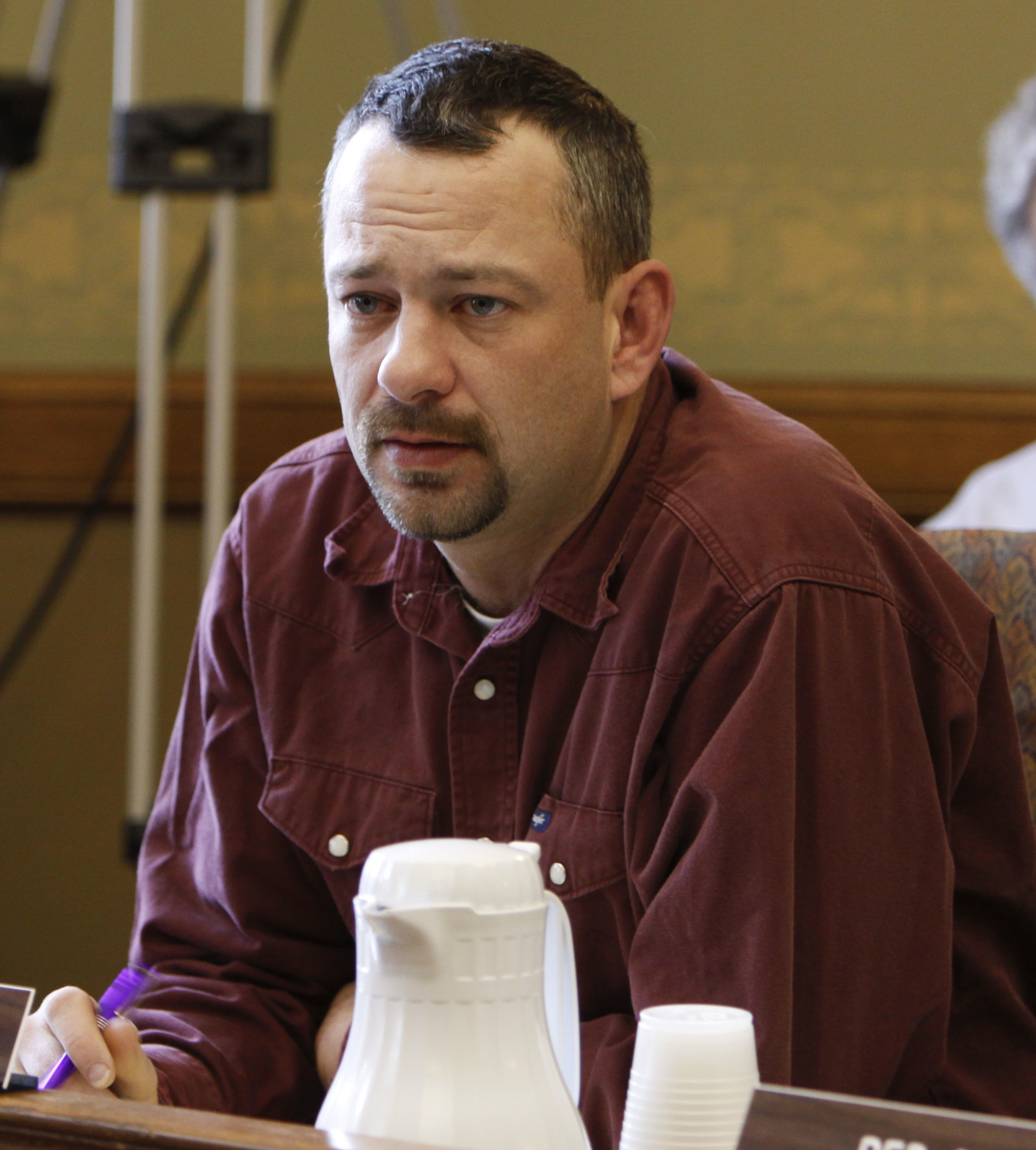
- Garthwaite in 2009

Member of the Wisconsin State Assembly from the 49th district
- In office January 3, 2007 – January 3, 2011
- Preceded by: Gabe Loeffelholz
- Succeeded by: Travis Tranel

Personal details
- Born: October 6, 1972 (age 53) Lancaster, Wisconsin
- Party: Democratic
- Occupation: farmer, radio broadcaster

Phil Garthwaite (born October 6, 1972) is a Democratic former member of the Wisconsin State Assembly, representing the 49th Assembly District from 2006 until his defeat in 2010. He was a member of the Committees on Agriculture, Transportation, Rural Affairs, and Rural Economic Development and the Council on Highway Safety.

Garthwaite attended UW-River Falls. He is a graduate of Continental Auctioneers University in Mankato, MN and Madison Media Institute. He is a former radio director and on-air personality. He is also a farmer manager and member of the National Association of Farm Broadcasting and the National Dairy Shrine.

He was defeated for re-election by Travis Tranel in 2010.

== Education ==
Phil Garthwaite has received his education from the following institutions:

- Graduated, Madison Media Institute, 1999
- Attended, Agricultural Communications, University of Wisconsin, River Falls 1991-1995
- Graduated, Continental Auctioneers University, Mankato, Montana, 1993

== Political experience ==
Phil Garthwaite has had the following political experience:

- Candidate, Wisconsin Assembly, District 49, 2010
- Assembly Member, Wisconsin State Assembly, 2006–2010

== Professional Experience ==
Phil Garthwaite has had the following professional experience:

- Farm Manager
- Farm Radio Broadcaster/Director
