= Travis Tranel =

American politician (born 1985)

Member of the Wisconsin State Assembly from the 49th district
- Incumbent
- Assumed office January 3, 2011
- Preceded by: Phil Garthwaite

Personal details
- Born: September 12, 1985 (age 41)
- Party: Republican
- Spouse: Stephanie Herbst
- Children: 5
- Education: Loras College (BA)
- Occupation: Politician; dairy farmer; businessman
- Website: travistranel.com

Travis Tranel (born September 12, 1985) is an American politician, dairy farmer and businessman from Wisconsin. A member of the Republican Party, he has served as a member of the Wisconsin State Assembly from the 49th district since 2011.

== Personal life ==
Tranel was born on September 12, 1985. He graduated from Loras College, where he received a Bachelor of Arts in economics and finance.

He married Stephanie Herbst in 2008. They have five children.

== Political career ==
Tranel announced his 2008 campaign for the 49th district of the Wisconsin State Assembly on January 21, 2008. He campaigned on a policy of lowering taxes, affordable health care, creating new jobs and quality education. He won the Republican primary, although lost to incumbent Phil Garthwaite.

He was elected as a member of the Wisconsin State Assembly in 2010. After winning his primary election by 3,024 to 2,519 votes, he unseated incumbent Democrat Phil Garthwaite, with 10,384 votes to his opponent's 7,844. He is a member of the Knights of Columbus and the National Rifle Association of America.

== Electoral history ==
=== Wisconsin Assembly (2008–present) ===
Year	Election	Date	Elected				Defeated				Total	Plurality
2008	Primary	Sep. 9	Travis Tranel	Republican	2,150	40.38%	Dennis Lundell	Rep.	1,599	30.03%	5,324	551
2008	Primary	Sep. 9	Travis Tranel	Republican	2,150	40.38%	David E. Kuhle	Rep.	1,571	29.51%	5,324	551
2008	General	Nov. 4	Phil Garthwaite (inc)	Democratic	13,865	53.96%	Travis Tranel	Rep.	11,793	45.90%	25,693	2,072
2010	Primary	Sep. 14	Travis Tranel	Republican	3,024	54.53%	Dave Kuhle	Rep.	2,519	45.42%	5,546	505
2010	General	Nov. 2	Travis Tranel	Republican	10,384	56.92%	Phil Garthwaite (inc)	Dem.	7,844	42.99%	18,244	2,540
2012	Primary	Aug. 14	Travis Tranel (inc)	Republican	3,773	64.47%	Dave Kuhle	Rep.	2,075	35.46%	5,852	1,698
2012	General	Nov. 6	Travis Tranel (inc)	Republican	14,218	54.19%	Carol Beals	Dem.	11,977	45.65%	26,235	2,241
2014	General	Nov. 4	Travis Tranel (inc)	Republican	12,240	61.38%	Chad Henneman	Dem.	7,689	38.56%	19,941	4,551
2016	General	Nov. 8	Travis Tranel (inc)	Republican	15,056	56.99%	Jesse Bennett	Dem.	11,344	42.94%	26,418	3,712
2018	General	Nov. 6	Travis Tranel (inc)	Republican	12,858	58.86%	Mike Mooney	Dem.	8,968	41.05%	21,844	3,890
2020	General	Nov. 3	Travis Tranel (inc)	Republican	16,741	59.19%	Shaun Murphy-Lopez	Dem.	11,528	40.76%	28,282	5,213
2022	General	Nov. 8	Travis Tranel (inc)	Republican	14,626	62.59%	Lynne Parrott	Dem.	8,725	37.34%	23,369	5,901
2024	General	Nov. 5	Travis Tranel (inc)	Republican	19,701	62.99%	Scott A. Walker	Dem.	11,546	36.92%	31,276	8,155
