= Gabe Loeffelholz =

American politician (born 1940)

Gabe Loeffelholz (born November 11, 1940) is an American Republican politician from Wisconsin

Born in the town of Paris, Grant County, Wisconsin, Loeffelholz served in the Wisconsin National Guard. He served in the Wisconsin State Assembly from 2001 until 2007, when he was defeated by Phil Garthwaite for reelection in 2006.
