= Gary J. Goldberg =

Gary J. Goldberg is the president, CEO and director of Newmont Mining Corporation, positions he has held since March 1, 2013. He joined the Newmont board of directors at the same time.

== Career ==
Gary Goldberg has spent over three decades in the mining industry. Before his work at Newmont, he was the president and chief executive officer at Rio Tinto Minerals from 2006 until 2011; as well as president and chief executive officer of Rio Tinto Borax from 2004 to 2006. In 2011, he was elected as the executive vice president and COO of Newmont Mining. In July 2012, he was promoted to president and COO. On March 1, 2013, he became the president and CEO of Newmont Mining Corp.

Goldberg was elected a member of the National Academy of Engineering in 2021 for promoting safety, sustainability, inclusion, value, ethics, and responsibility in the mining industry.

== Board memberships and chairmanships ==
Goldberg served as the chairman of the National Mining Association in the United States from 2008 to 2010. He was appointed to the Australian Government's Business Roundtable on Sustainable Development. He was formerly on the Boards as a director at Coal & Allied Industries Ltd. and Rio Tinto Zimbabwe.

== Awards ==
- Daniel C. Jackling Award (2014).
- National Academy of Engineering (2021)

== Education ==
Goldberg received his Bachelor of Science degree in Mining Engineering from the University of Wisconsin–Platteville.
