= Robert S. Travis Jr. =

American politician (born 1947)

Robert S. Travis Jr. (born August 24, 1947) is a former American politician.

Born in Cuba City, Wisconsin, Travis graduated from Platteville High School in Platteville, Wisconsin, and then went to University of Wisconsin–Platteville from 1965 to 1969. He served in the United States Army from 1969 to 1976. Travis served in the Wisconsin State Assembly from 1977 to 1987 and was a Republican. His father was Robert S. Travis who also served in the Wisconsin Legislature.
