= University of Wisconsin–Platteville =

Public university in Platteville, Wisconsin, US

University of Wisconsin-Platteville
- Former names: List: Platteville Normal School (1866–1926); Platteville State Teachers College (1926–1951); Wisconsin State College, Platteville (1951–1959); Wisconsin Mining Trade School (1907–1939); Wisconsin Institute of Technology (1939–1959); Wisconsin State College and Institute of Technology (1959–1966); Wisconsin State University–Platteville (1966–1971)
- Motto: A Smart Investment
- Type: Public university
- Established: 1866; 160 years ago
- Parent institution: Universities of Wisconsin
- Chancellor: Tammy Evetovich
- Provost: Laura Reynolds
- Students: 6,486 (fall 2022)
- Undergraduates: 6,028
- Postgraduates: 458
- Location: Platteville, Wisconsin, United States; 42.733°N 90.488°W
- Campus: 820 acres (332 ha)
- Colors: Orange and blue
- Nickname: Pioneers
- Sporting affiliations: NCAA Division III - WIAC
- Mascot: Pioneer Pete
- Website: uwplatt.edu

University of Wisconsin–Platteville (UW–Platteville or UW Platt) is a public university in Platteville, Wisconsin, United States. Part of the University of Wisconsin System, it offers bachelor's and master's degrees across three colleges and enrolls approximately 6,400 students as of 2024.

== History ==
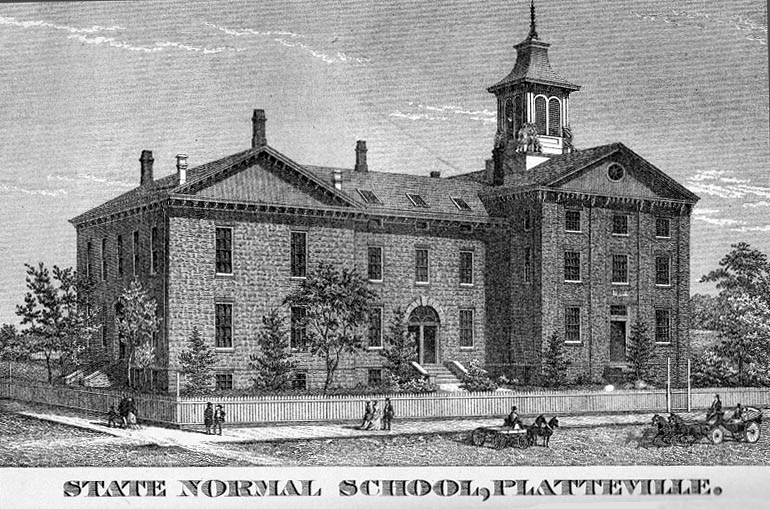
Platteville Normal School, from the 1885 edition of the Wisconsin Blue Book

The university grew from the 1959 merger of two schools: Wisconsin State College, Platteville, and the Wisconsin Institute of Technology. WSC–Platteville was founded in 1866 as "Platteville Normal School", the first teacher preparation school in Wisconsin. It was renamed "Platteville State Teachers College" in 1926 and "Wisconsin State College, Platteville" in 1951. The Wisconsin Institute of Technology, founded in 1907 as the "Wisconsin Mining Trade School", was founded to train technicians for the numerous mining operations around Platteville. It evolved into the first three-year program for mining engineers in the United States. It changed its name to the "Wisconsin Institute of Technology" in 1939.

The merged school took the name "Wisconsin State College and Institute of Technology" in 1959. In 1966, along with Wisconsin's other state colleges, it was granted university status as "Wisconsin State University–Platteville". It took its current name, the University of Wisconsin-Platteville, after the Wisconsin State University system merged with the University of Wisconsin in 1971.

Starting in the late 1960s, the University of Wisconsin–Platteville expanded its academic program and established new colleges, the largest being a business college. The mining college was transformed into an engineering college encompassing mining, electrical, mechanical, and eventually electronic engineering. In the late 1980s, the mining engineering degree was phased out because of falling enrollment. By that time it had been overshadowed by the other engineering degrees.

From 1984 to 2000, the Chicago Bears of the National Football League held pre-season training camp at UW–Platteville. They were considered a member of the "Cheese League" that in 1999 consisted of the Green Bay Packers, New Orleans Saints and Kansas City Chiefs, with each team practicing at a different university in Wisconsin. In 2001, the Illinois General Assembly asked the Bears to move to an Illinois practice facility in order to raise funds for remodeling Soldier Field. Before the Bears left, they donated $250,000 to UW–Platteville for a new computer lab, which was named "The Bears Den" and is located in the Markee Pioneer Student Center.

In the 1980s, UW–Platteville made an effort to bring businesses to the Platteville area to take advantage of university resources. Rockwell Automation started this trend in the 1980s when it recruited two engineering professors at UW–Platteville to start an engineering firm. Rockwell provided financing and awarded them major contracts. The resulting business was Insight Industries, which later changed to AVISTA Inc. (now a division of Esterline, Inc.).

On June 16, 2014, an EF2 tornado struck the UW–Platteville campus, causing $18.6 million in damage.

The Agriculture and Manual Arts Building/Platteville State Normal School, now known as Ullrich Hall, is listed on the National Register of Historic Places.

In 2018, the University of Wisconsin System restructured through the Collaborative Integration Project, which bound the University of Wisconsin Colleges to the Universities. The University of Wisconsin-Richland and the University of Wisconsin-Baraboo/Sauk County were joined with Platteville as branch campuses, and renamed the University of Wisconsin–Platteville Richland and the University of Wisconsin–Platteville Baraboo/Sauk County respectively.

In 2019, UW-Platteville opened a 1,500 square-foot hydroponics laboratory in Glenview Commons. The lab is operated entirely by students and grows a variety of greens for campus dining services using a film of water to disperse nutrients. The system grows around 100 pounds of lettuce a week, with the food being available to students within hours after harvest.

In 2021, UW-Platteville installed a 2.4-megawatt solar array in Memorial Park. The university reported that the array was expected to offset energy use by 17% and save around $217,000 annually. On Earth Day 2021, Chancellor Dennis Shields pledged that UW-Platteville would become a zero-waste campus by 2035.

In August 2021, Boebel Hall, located on the UW-Platteville campus and originally built in 1976, underwent a comprehensive $23.7 million state-funded renovation complete with a ribbon-cutting ceremony. The renovation featured specialized labs including cadaver, microbiology, molecular, and freshwater environmental science labs.

In October 2021, UW-Platteville opened a new engineering building, Sesquicentennial Hall, that includes one of the Upper Midwest's largest "maker spaces" designed to support entrepreneurs and innovation.

On September 1, 2022, more than 300 people attended the ribbon-cutting for Sesquicentennial Hall, a $55 million, 200,000 square-foot engineering building connecting to Busby Hall of Engineering. Interim Chancellor Tammy Evetovich described the facility as "the beginning of a new era," and noted that it would provide more hands-on learning experiences.

On May 19, 2025, two students were killed in a shooting at a residence hall on campus.

On October 17, Chancellor Tammy Evetovich that the UW-Platteville Baraboo Sauk County campus would be closing in spring of 2026.

== Campus ==
The University of Wisconsin-Platteville (UW–Platteville) campus is 821 acres (332 ha) in size:

- Campus proper: 362 acres (146 ha)
- Pioneer Farm: 400 acres (160 ha)
- The mound: 90 acres (36 ha)

Since 2015, UW‐Platteville has had a written plan to guide decisions affecting the 362 acres of our campus. This plan "…establishes a broad scope for how we plan to oversee our land in the future and strives to responsibly invest in and steward our 120 acres of open space."

UW–Platteville's campus has no city streets that cut through campus. During the 1960s, all city streets and parking lots within the campus were replaced with wide sidewalks and manicured lawns.

UW–Platteville has 13 residence halls. Southwest Hall opened in the fall of 2006. To accommodate a rapidly growing student body, Rountree Commons opened in August 2012 and Bridgeway Commons opened in August 2013.

Ullsvik Hall, renovated and expanded between 2006 and 2008, houses administrative offices, academic facilities, visitor center, and other support departments. It also has banquet and catering facilities, including the Robert I. Velzy Commons, and the Nohr Art Gallery.

In 2002, a new student union, the Markee Pioneer Student Center, was opened at the center of campus. The new location makes the student union the heart of the campus. The union also serves as a technology and activity hub with a large computer lab (the Bear's Den), an involvement center, and on-campus activities. The union houses three of eight dining complexes, the Pioneer Crossing, Pioneer Haus, and The Pioneer Perk. The other location for food on campus is Bridgeway Commons, located in the residence hall section of campus. In 2011 the student center building was named the Markee Pioneer Student Center, after former chancellor David Markee and his wife Lou Ann.

=== Campus buildings ===
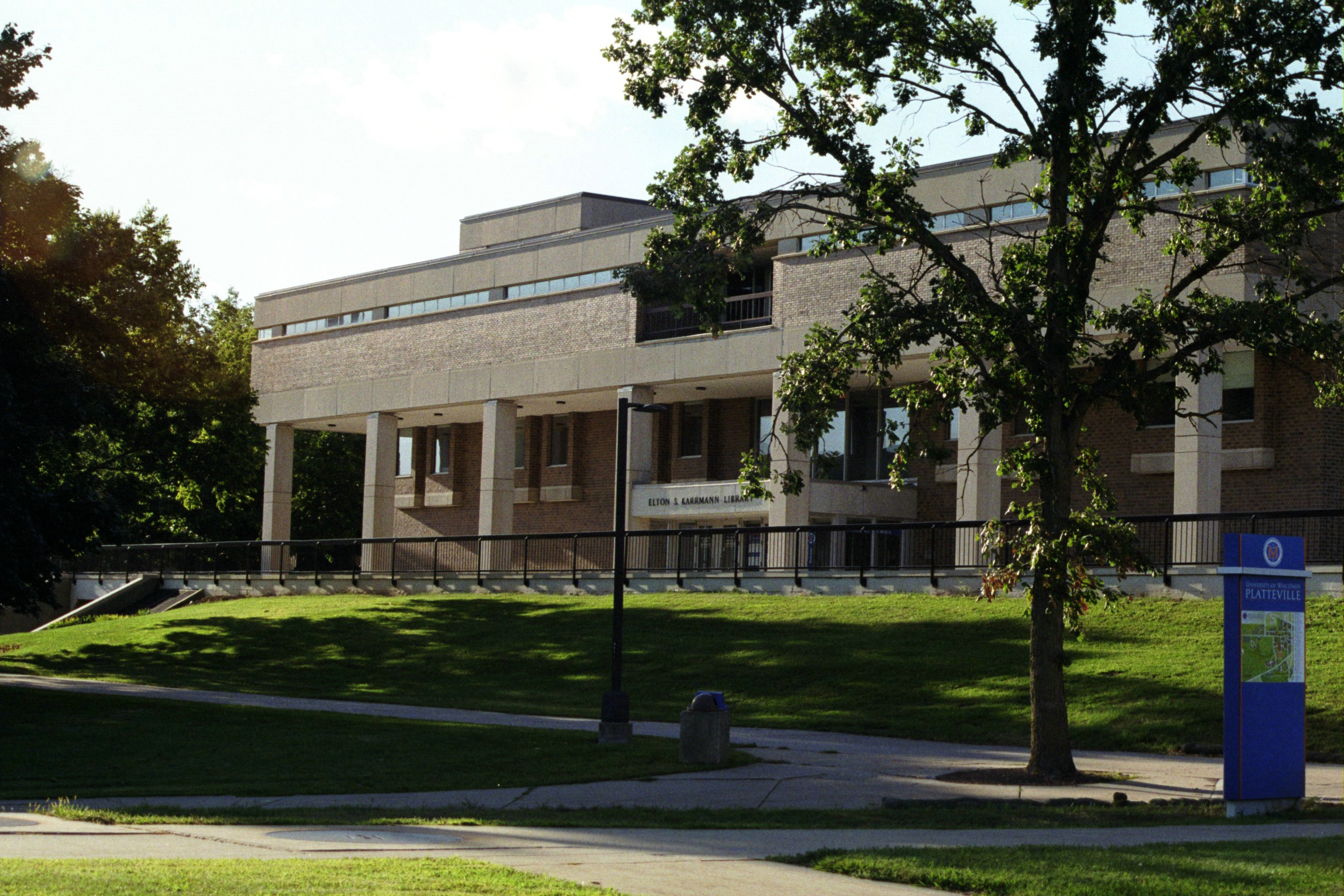
Elton S. Karrmann Library

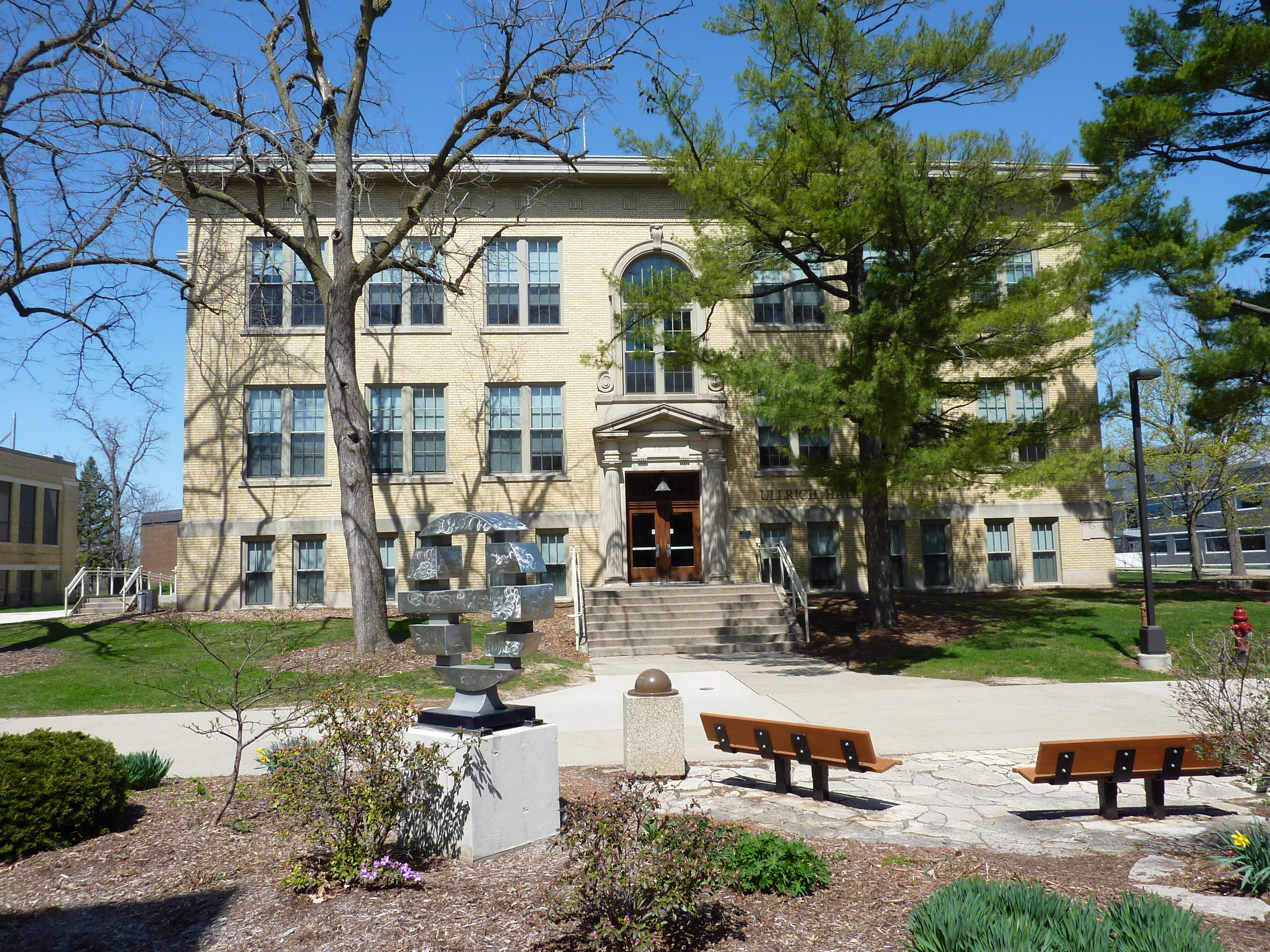
Ullrich Hall

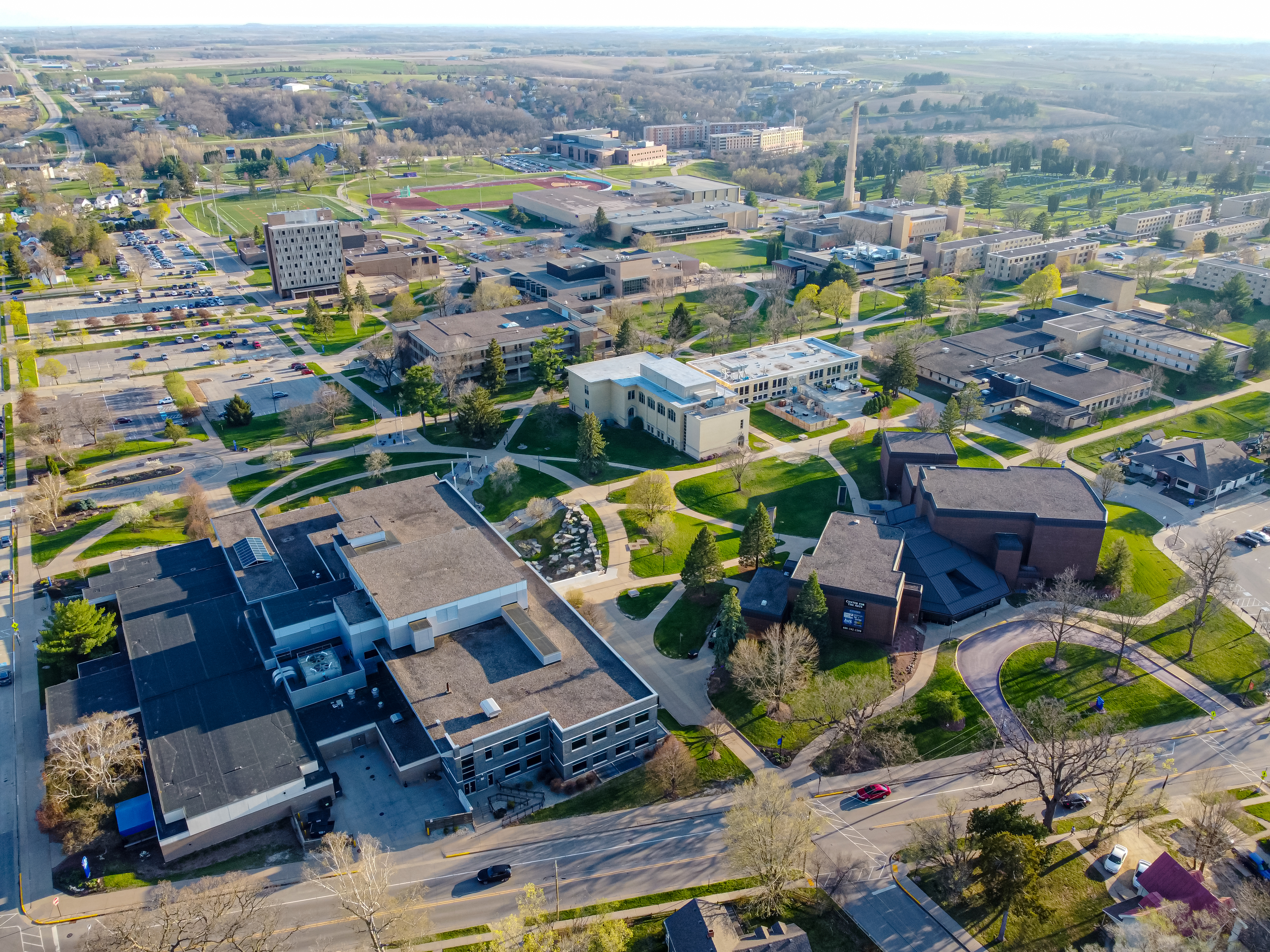
Aerial view of UW–Platteville

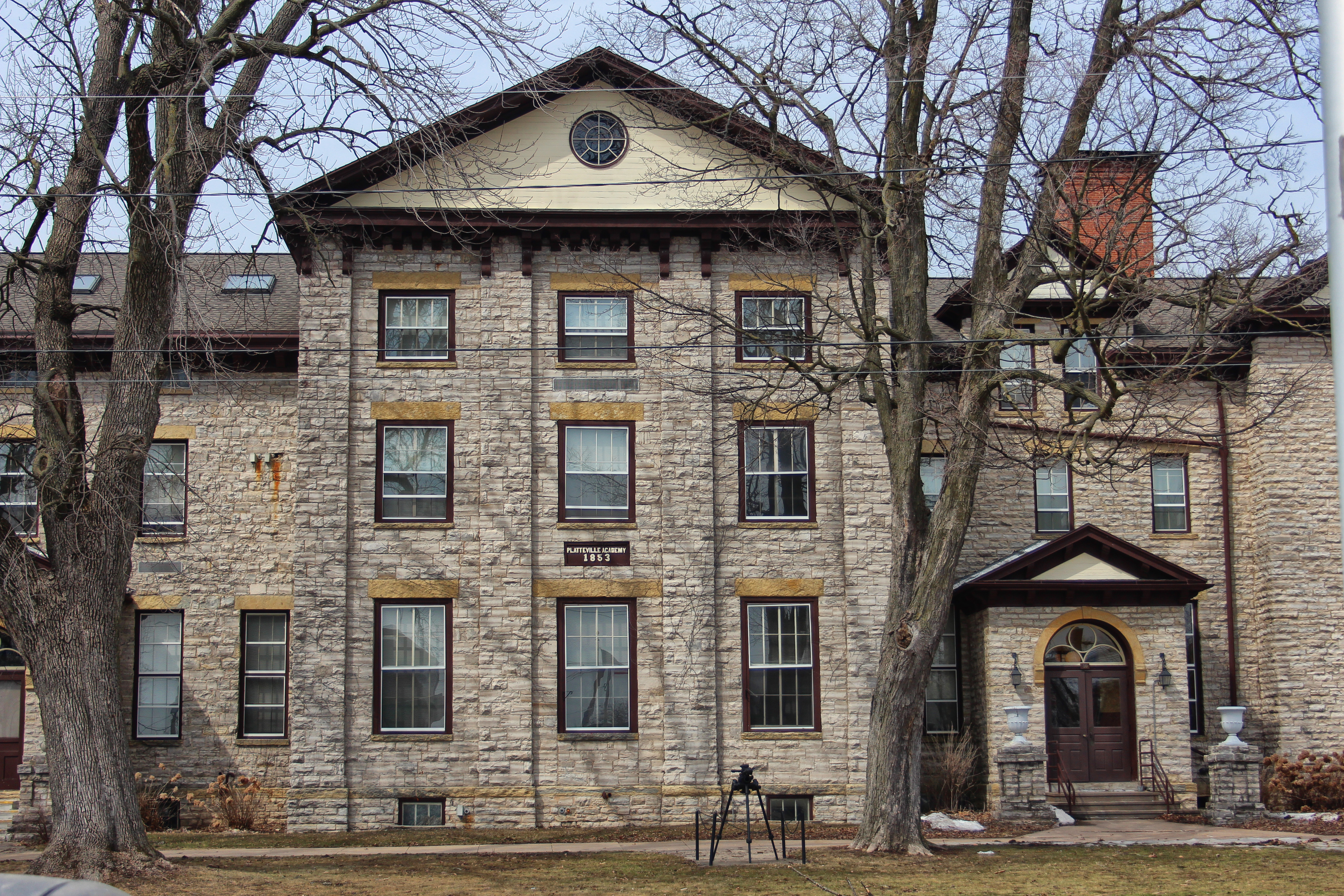
Rountree Hall

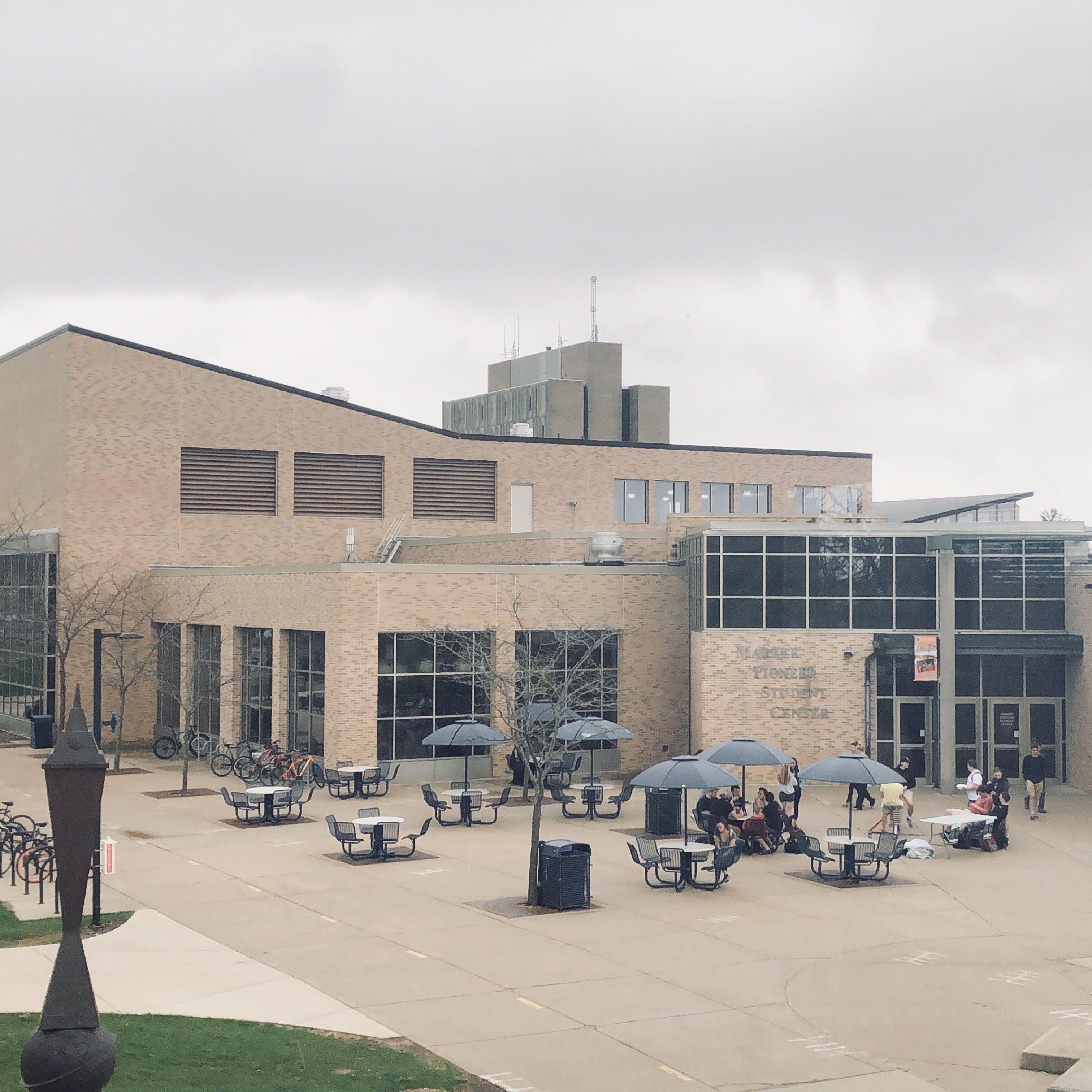
Markee Pioneer Student Center

== Organization and administration ==
The university is part of the University of Wisconsin System, and has an administrative staff headed by a chancellor. Its colleges are headed by deans and departments chairpersons who report to the deans. The university consists of three colleges that offer bachelor's and master's degrees:

- The College of Business, Industry, Life Sciences and Agriculture – offering programs in modern business and industrial applications, biology and agricultural sciences.
- The College of Liberal Arts and Education – with programs in humanities, social sciences (such as psychology), fine arts and education
- The College of Engineering, Mathematics and Science – consisting of electrical, mechanical, industrial, civil/environmental, computer science, software engineering, chemistry, engineering physics, and mathematics.

== Academics ==
In 2004, UWP received approval from the UW system to increase its enrollment from 5,500 to 7,500 students. UWP started a program called the Tri-State Initiative, which aims to attract prospective students from Illinois and Iowa. The enrollment of UWP, as of Spring 2008, stood at 7,795 undergraduates and 830 graduate students. As of 2004, UWP was staffed by 336 faculty.

In 1978, the University introduced print-based courses to enable Wisconsin residents living in isolated areas to earn an undergraduate degree in business administration without having to travel to a university campus. In 1996, the residency requirement was amended and the distance program was extended to working adults living throughout the United States. In 1999, online graduate programs in criminal justice, engineering, and project management were introduced, allowing students throughout the world to earn an accredited degree at a distance from UWP. In addition to accredited degree programs, UWP has also developed online leadership and management courses in association with the Wisconsin Department of Justice and on-site project management courses in association with a project management consulting company.

== Student life ==
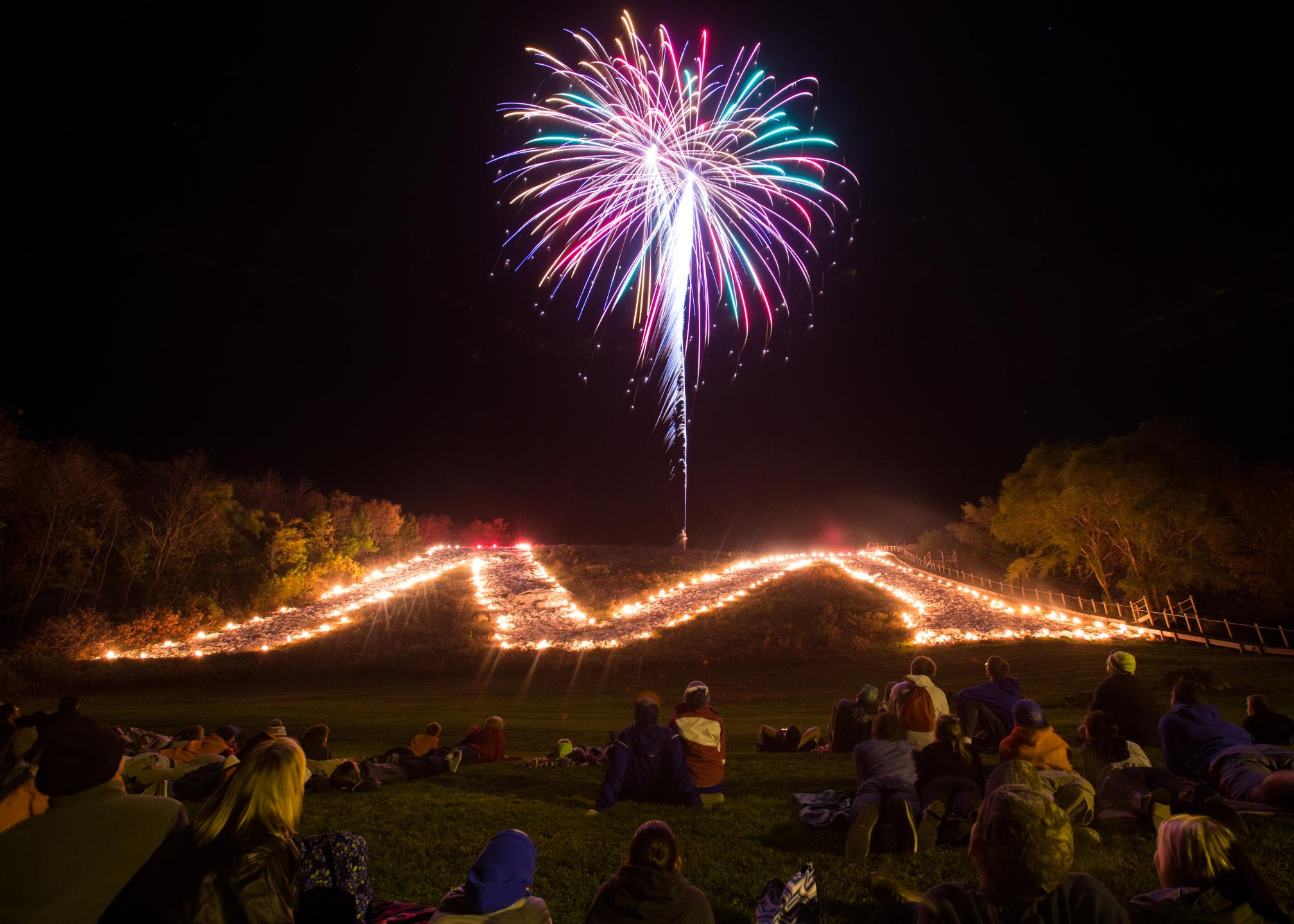
Lighting of the Platte Mound M

Of the student body, over 3,700 live in campus residence halls, with a growing number of students staying in town during the weekends. Students who don't live on campus typically live in houses off-campus which are rented by the year. The local music scene has been active, producing several bands a year.

UW–Platteville has over 250 clubs and organizations. The student newspaper, The Exponent, is published weekly by a student staff. The student radio station, WSUP, is the oldest radio station in the UW system.

The largest celebration by UW–Platteville students is the twice-annual lighting of the Platte Mound M. The "M" is located on Platte Mound, a nearby large hill east of the city of Platteville.

Each Spring, the men's and women's rugby clubs host Mudfest on campus, a large fifteen-style rugby tournament for teams around the Midwest.

== Athletics ==
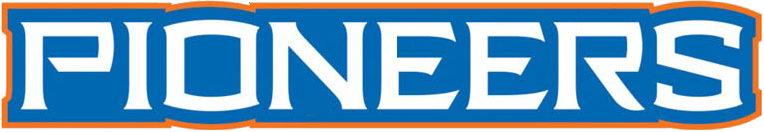
UW Platteville athletics wordmark

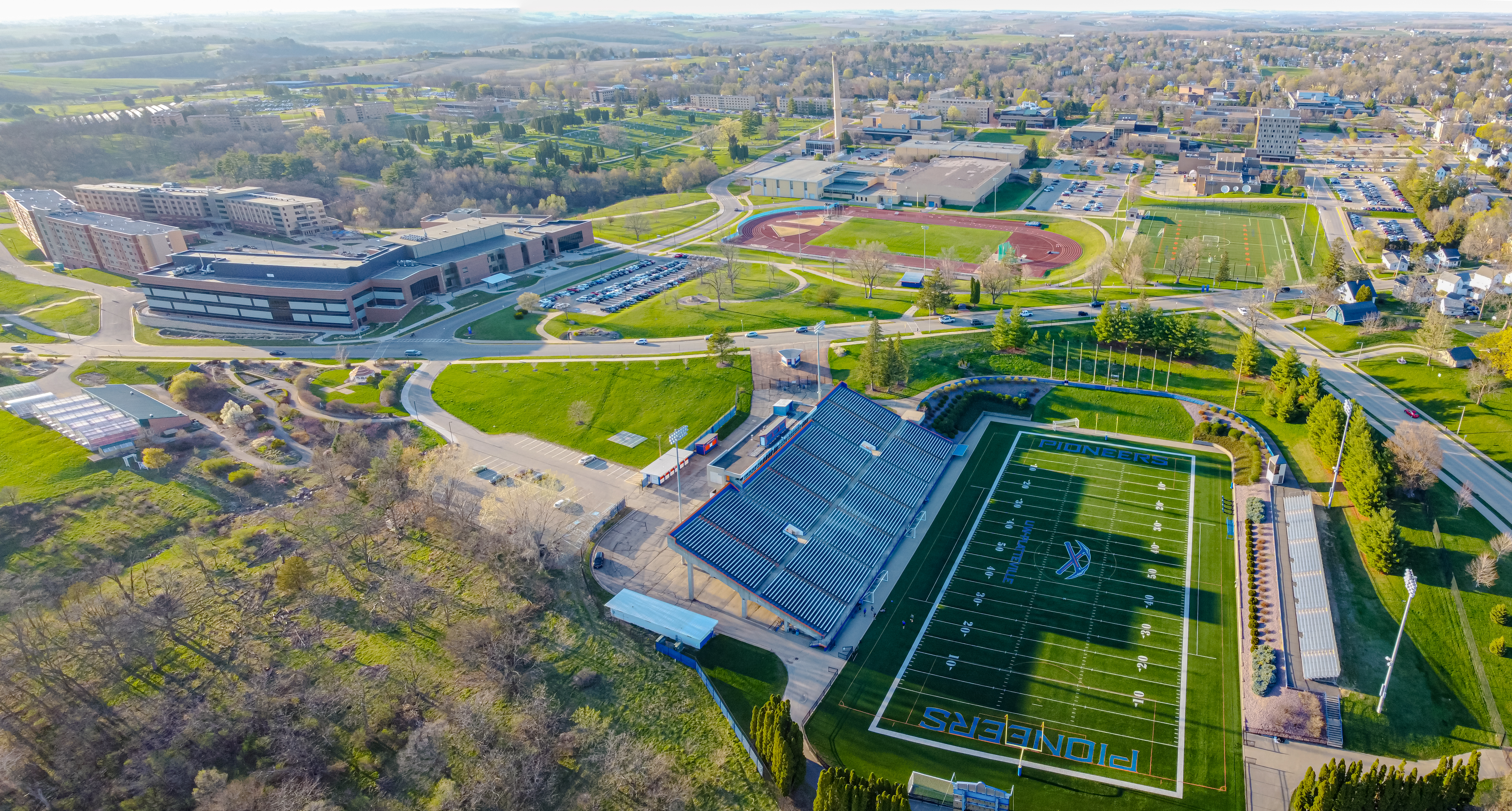
UW-Platteville athletic fields

UW–Platteville is a member of the Wisconsin Intercollegiate Athletic Conference in 14 sports, including football and basketball. The teams are nicknamed "the Pioneers". Men's sports include basketball, football, indoor and outdoor track and field, cross country, wrestling, soccer, and baseball. Women's sports include basketball, soccer, indoor and outdoor track and field, volleyball, cross country, golf, softball, and cheerleading. All teams compete in NCAA Division III and Wisconsin Intercollegiate Athletic Conference. There are also a number of club sports teams such as hockey and lacrosse which are partially funded through the university. The Ralph E. Davis Pioneer Stadium is home to the football team, lacrosse team, and soccer team. Williams Fieldhouse is home to the men's and women's basketball teams.

The men's basketball team won NCAA Division III championships in 1991, 1995, 1998, and 1999. The Pioneers qualified for the Division III men's basketball tournament from 1991-1999 and returned 10 years later in 2009. Bo Ryan, who later became head coach of the Wisconsin Badgers, guided the Pioneers to a 353-76 record and the best winning percentage in NCAA Division III basketball. Ryan established one of the best home court advantages of all time as the Pioneers only lost 5 games at home in a decade. The team averaged 26 wins a season in the 1990s, when the Division III men's regular season schedule only allowed 25 games per year. The university named the basketball floor "Bo Ryan Court" in January 2007.

== Notable people ==
The following have attended or held positions at University of Wisconsin–Platteville:

=== Athletics ===
- Dan Arnold – professional football player
- Geep Chryst – college and professional football coach
- Greg Gard – college basketball player and coach
- Rob Jeter – college basketball player and coach
- Saul Phillips – college basketball player and coach
- Chester J. Roberts – college basketball and college football coach
- Bo Ryan – college basketball coach

=== Alumni ===
- James N. Azim, Jr. – Wisconsin State Representative
- Taylor G. Brown – Wisconsin State Senator
- Joseph L. Bull (B.S. 1992) – biomedical engineer, first Native American dean of a U.S. engineering college.
- James R. Charneski – Wisconsin State Representative
- Lee Croft – professional football player
- Glenn Robert Davis – U.S. Representative
- Tom Davis – college basketball coach
- George Engebretson – Wisconsin State Senator
- Charles E. Estabrook – Wisconsin Attorney General
- Greg Gard – college basketball coach
- Gary J. Goldberg – President and Chief Executive Officer, Newmont Mining Corporation
- William H. Goldthorpe – Wisconsin State Representative
- Mike Hintz – professional football player
- William A. Jones – Wisconsin State Representative
- Arthur W. Kopp – Wisconsin politician and jurist
- Dennis R. Larsen – U.S. Air Force Lieutenant General
- James B. McCoy – Wisconsin State Representative
- Phil Micech – professional football player
- James William Murphy – U.S. Representative
- David Ott – classical music composer
- John F. Reynolds – Wisconsin State Representative and Senator
- Elmer Lloyd Rundell – Wisconsin State Representative
- Edward H. Sprague – Wisconsin State Representative
- Barbara Thompson – Wisconsin Superintendent of Public Instruction
- Jerome Van Sistine – Wisconsin State Senator
- A. V. Wells – Wisconsin State Representative
- T. Harry Williams – historian
- James Wright – historian and president of Dartmouth College

=== Faculty ===
- Charles Herman Allen – founding principal of the Platteville Normal School
- Duncan McGregor – Wisconsin State Representative
- Kathryn Morrison – Wisconsin State Senator

== See also ==
- WSUP-FM – student radio station (90.5 MHz)
- Platteville Public Transportation - Transit agency which serves campus
