= History of San Jose, California =

- Location in Santa Clara, California
- 37°18′15″N 121°52′22″W
- Location: San Jose, California

California Historical Landmark
- Official name: First Site of El Pueblo de San Jose de Guadalupe
- Designated: March 16, 1949
- Reference no.: 433

San Jose, California, is the third largest city in the state, and the largest of all cities in the San Francisco Bay Area and Northern California, with a population of 1,021,795.

== Site chosen by Anza ==
For thousands of years before the arrival of European settlers, the area now known as San Jose was inhabited by several groups of Ohlone Native Americans. Permanent European presence in the area came with the 1770 founding of the Presidio of Monterey and Mission San Carlos Borromeo de Carmelo by Gaspar de Portolà and Junípero Serra, about sixty miles (97 km) to the south. Don Pedro Fages, the military governor at Monterey, passed through the area on his 1770 and 1772 expeditions to explore the East Bay and Sacramento River Delta.

Late in 1775, Juan Bautista de Anza led the first overland expedition to bring colonists from New Spain (Mexico) to California and to locate sites for two missions, one presidio, and one pueblo (town). He left the colonists at Monterey in 1776, and explored north with a small group. He selected the sites of the Presidio of San Francisco and Mission San Francisco de Asís in what is now San Francisco; on his way back to Monterey, he sited Mission Santa Clara de Asís and the pueblo San Jose in the Santa Clara Valley. Anza returned to Mexico City before any of the settlements were actually founded, but his name lives on in many buildings and street names.

== Founding ==
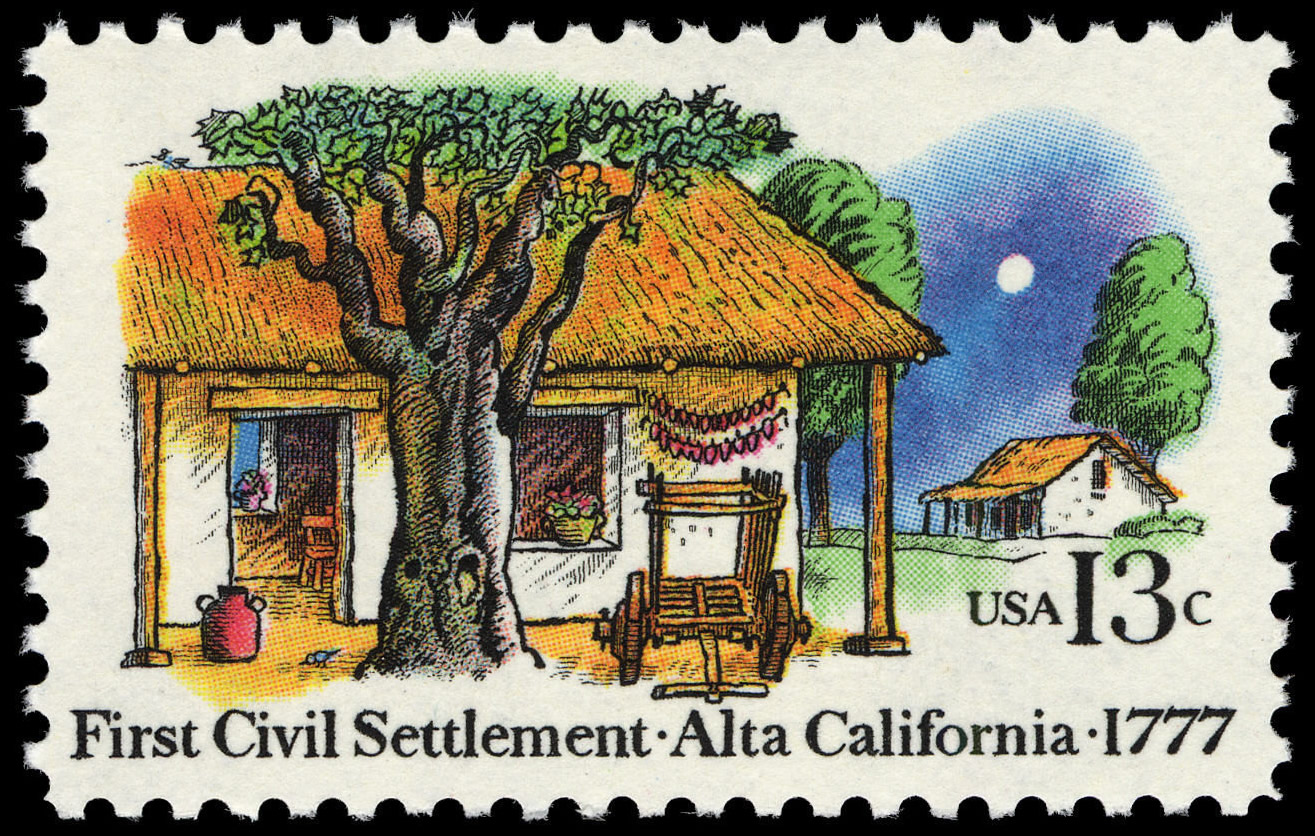
Commemorative stamp marking the 200th anniversary (1977) of the El Pueblo de San José de Guadalupe .

El Pueblo de San José de Guadalupe (The Town of Saint Joseph of Guadalupe) was founded by José Joaquín Moraga on November 29, 1777, the first pueblo-town not associated with a mission or a military post (presidio) in upper Las Californias. (Mission Santa Clara, the closest mission, was founded earlier in 1777, three miles (4.8 km) from the original pueblo site in neighboring Santa Clara. Mission San José was not founded until 1797, about 20 miles (32 km) north of San Jose in what is now Fremont.) The town was founded by the colonists led to California by Anza, as a farming community to provide food for the presidios of San Francisco and Monterey. In 1778, the pueblo had a population of 68.

In 1781, Governor Felipe de Neve issued the first rules regarding governance of secular pueblos (only two at that time; San José and Los Ángeles), the "Regulations for the Government of the Province of the Californias" (Reglamento para el gobierno de la provincia de Californias)

In 1785, José Manual Gonzáles was elected alcalde, or mayor. He served until 1789. In 1797 he built the Peralta Adobe, which is now the oldest surviving structure in San José.

In 1797, the pueblo was moved from its original location, near the present-day intersection of Hobson and San Pedro streets, to a location in what is now Downtown San Jose, surrounding Pueblo Plaza (now Plaza de César Chávez).

In the ensuing years a number of Mexican Rancho Land Grants were confirmed within the lands now considered San Jose.

== 19th century ==
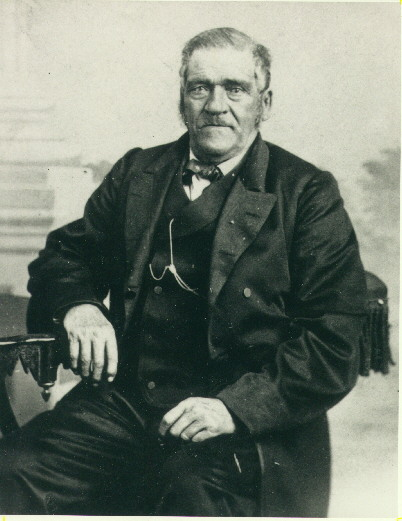
Don Salvio Pacheco served as alcalde from 1827 to 1828.

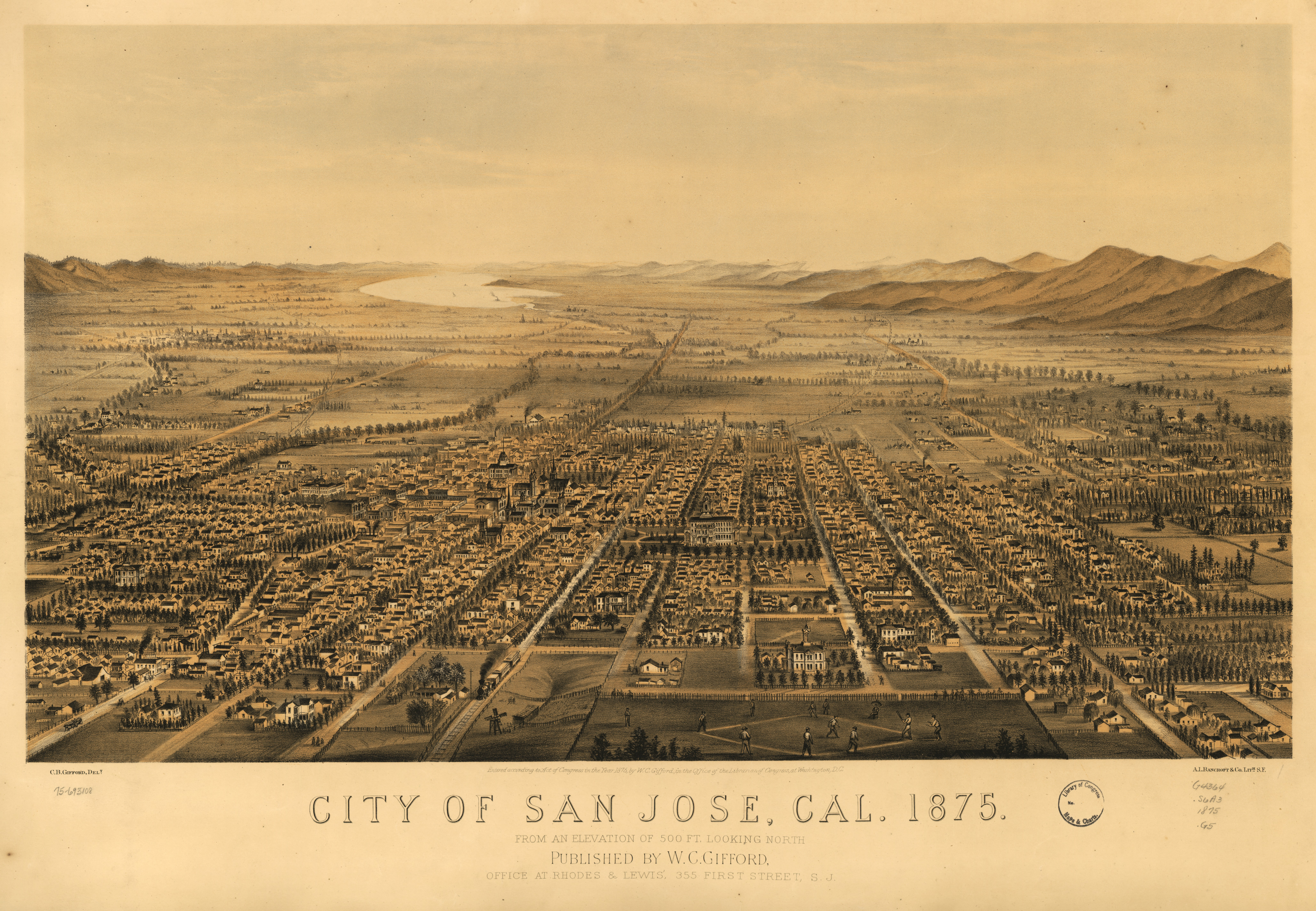
San Jose, 1875.

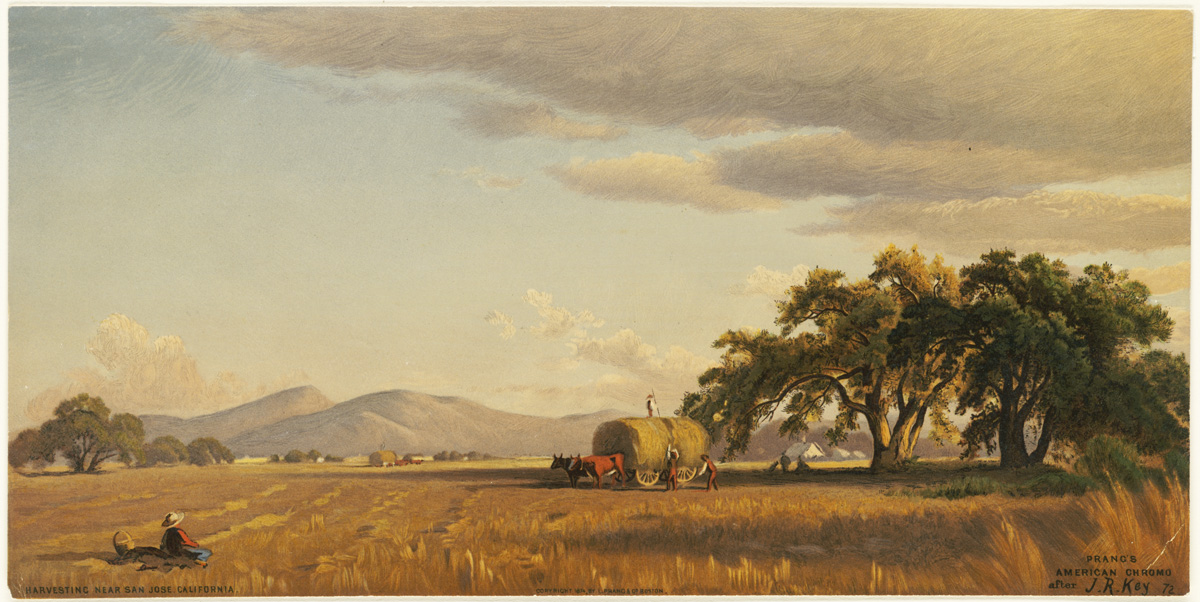
Harvesting near San Jose, California; 1874, John Ross Key.

During the Bear Flag Revolt, Captain Thomas Fallon led a small force from Santa Cruz and captured the pueblo without bloodshed on July 11, 1846. Fallon received an American flag from John D. Sloat, and raised it over the pueblo on July 14, as the California Republic agreed to join the United States following the start of the Mexican–American War. Fallon would later become the tenth mayor of San Jose. It's unclear whether or not Fallon ordered all townspeople of Spanish/Mexican origin out of San Jose, as some local historians claimed.

During the California Gold Rush period, the New Almaden Quicksilver Mines just south of the city were the largest mercury mines in North America (mercury was used to help separate gold from ore). The cinnabar deposits were discovered in 1845 by a Mexican cavalry captain, Andres Castillero, when he recognized the red powder used by local Ohlone Indians to decorate the chapel at Mission Santa Clara. Mining operations began in 1847 at what was the first operating mine in the province, just in time for the Gold Rush. The importance of the mercury industry at the time explains why the local newspaper is named the Mercury News.

On March 27, 1850, San Jose became the first incorporated city in the U.S. state of California; the first mayor was Josiah Belden. It also served as the state's first capital with the first and second sessions of the California Legislature, known as the Legislature of a Thousand Drinks, being held there in 1850 and 1851. The legislature was unhappy with the location, as no buildings suitable for a state government were available in the city, and took up State Senator Mariano Guadalupe Vallejo's offer to build a new capital on land he donated to the state in what is now Benicia.

From 1858 to 1861, San Jose was a stop on the Butterfield Overland Mail stage line.

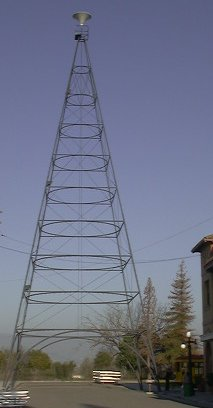
This replica of the Light Tower at the San Jose History Park stands only half of the original tower's 237 feet (72 m).

In 1881, because of a forceful campaign by editor J.J. Owen of the San Jose Mercury, the city council authorized the construction of the San Jose Electric Light Tower, ostensibly to replace the gas streetlights that had illuminated downtown San Jose since 1861. It didn't provide sufficient illumination, and by 1884 was used only for ceremonial purposes. It collapsed during the great gale of 1915. In 1989, an informal "Court of Historical Inquiry" looked into the issue of whether the Eiffel Tower was a copyright infringement of the Electric Light Tower; the Justice ruled that it was not.

In 1884, Sarah L. Winchester (née Pardee), the widow of William Winchester and heiress to the empire that manufactured the Winchester rifle, moved from Connecticut to San Jose and began a construction project of such magnitude that it was to occupy the lives of carpenters and craftsmen until her death: the house was continually under construction for thirty-eight years. Before the 1906 San Francisco earthquake, the Winchester Mystery House reached a height of 7 stories; today it stands three stories with approximately 160 rooms.

== 20th century ==
In 1909, Dr. Charles Herrold began experimental radio broadcasts in downtown San Jose. His station was commercially licensed in 1921 as KQW, then moved to San Francisco, where it became KCBS in 1949.

The 1933 kidnapping and murder of Brooke Hart resulted in mob violence in San Jose. About 10,000 residents (approximately 1/6 of the city's population at the time) stormed the jail and lynched the two men who had confessed to the killing. The case drew international attention to San Jose, for the kidnapping, lynching, and for the praise that Governor, James Rolph directed to those who participated. It is also notable as the last public lynching in California's history.

During World War II, San Jose experienced racial tension in neighborhoods where large populations of African Americans, Mexican Americans and Japanese Americans lived on the city's western and eastern edges. Most of the Japanese community were removed and interned in war detention camps in the course of the war. Anti-Mexican violence based on the earlier Zoot Suit Riots in Los Angeles took place in the summer of 1943 in San Jose. Large numbers of black people from the Southern states moved to San Jose to work in the city's growing wartime manufacturing industry, during the Second Great Migration.

San Jose was a conservative Republican bastion until the 1980s, when a political shift away from the more conservative agricultural heritage still shared by most of rural California to a more urban outlook, mirroring the voting patterns of the more densely populated urban centers of such formerly agricultural communities such as Los Angeles. San Jose now has a Democratic majority in party registration.

== 21st century ==
On May 26, 2021, a mass shooting occurred at a Santa Clara Valley Transportation Authority (VTA) train yard in San Jose. Ten people were killed, including the gunman, identified as a VTA employee.

San Jose recovered much more quickly from the COVID-19 pandemic than the cities of San Francisco and Oakland to the north. San Jose mayor Matt Mahan joked that one day the San Francisco Bay Area might be renamed the "San Jose Bay Area", after its largest and most prosperous city.

== Earthquakes ==
San Jose lies near several active faults, including the Monte Vista Fault, Hayward Fault Zone, Calaveras Fault, Silver Creek Fault, and the San Andreas Fault. Significant events occurred in 1856, 1858, 1864, 1865, 1868, 1881, 1891, 1897, 1898, 1906, 1957, 1989, and 2007. The 1906 San Francisco earthquake, with its epicenter slightly off the coast of San Francisco near Golden Gate Park, devastated many buildings in San Jose. The city was still primarily rural and the population was much smaller than San Francisco. Houses and businesses were not built as close as they were on the peninsula, and this provided less opportunity for major fires. The all-brick Agnews Asylum (later Agnews State Hospital) was destroyed, killing over 100 people as the walls and roof collapsed. The 8-year-old San Jose High School's three-story stone and brick structure also collapsed, and many other buildings were severely damaged. There have been many other moderate earthquakes that have been felt in San Jose that caused little or no damage. Most damage from earthquakes are quickly repaired, but some effects may still be seen in the form of cracked sidewalks and raised curbs.

== Transition from agriculture to technology ==
For nearly two centuries a farming community, San Jose produced a significant amount of fruits and vegetables until the 1960s, and many past and current names of teams, streets, buildings, and so on reflect its agricultural beginnings. Prunes, grapes, and apricots were some of the major crops. In 1922, the first commercial farming of broccoli in the U.S. was started in San Jose, by brothers Stephano and Andrea D'Arrigo. The Del Monte cannery in Midtown was the largest employer in the city for many years. There were so many orchards in the Santa Clara Valley, which emitted a delightful smell of ripening fruit, that a common nickname for the Santa Clara Valley was The Valley of Heart's Delight.

Food Machinery Corporation (FMC) was founded in nearby Los Gatos as the Bean Spray Pump Company in 1884 and moved to San Jose in 1903. In 1941 the company received an order from the United States War Department for one thousand LVTs, bringing defense contracts to San Jose for the first time. After World War II, FMC continued as a defense contractor, with the San Jose facilities designing and manufacturing military platforms such as the M113 Armored Personnel Carrier, the Bradley Fighting Vehicle, and various subsystems of the M1 Abrams. FMC's military business would later be spun off into United Defense.

=== Silicon Valley ===
IBM established their first west coast operations in San Jose in 1943, with a punch card facility. In 1952 they opened a downtown research and development lab, where Reynold Johnson and his team invented RAMAC (Random Access Method of Accounting and Control). In 1956 IBM opened its Cottle Road manufacturing facility in the Santa Teresa neighborhood, where disc drives were invented in 1962. It was sold to Hitachi, who in turn sold the property to a developer. IBM still rents two buildings on the campus. IBM moved the research and development operation out of downtown, opening a large facility the Coyote Valley in 1976, and the Almaden Research Center in 1986.

=== Urban sprawl ===
By the 1970s, urban sprawl had eliminated most of the orchards, and the Valley of Heart's Delight had been transformed into Silicon Valley.

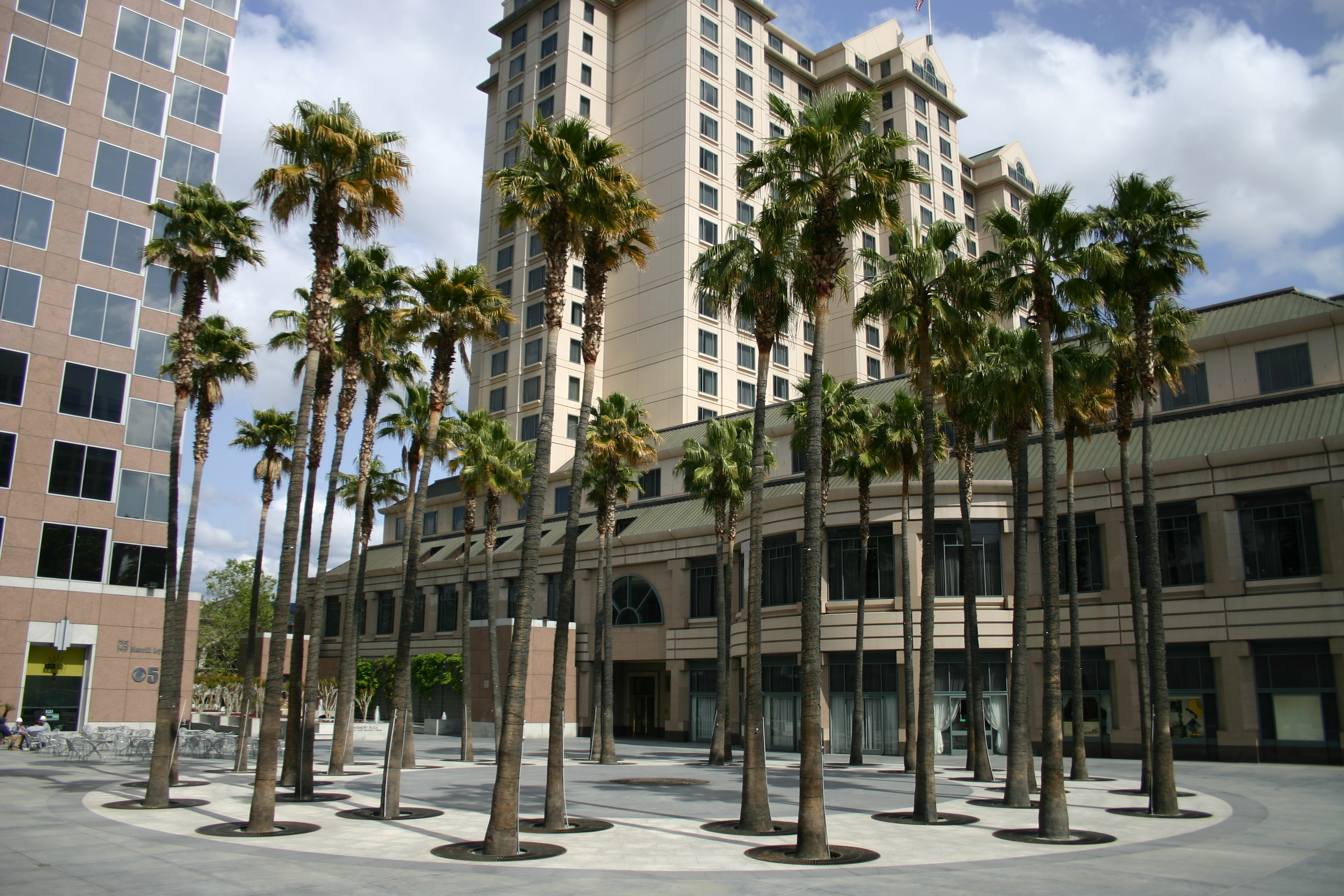
The Circle of Palms in downtown San Jose today marks the historical site of California's first state capitol

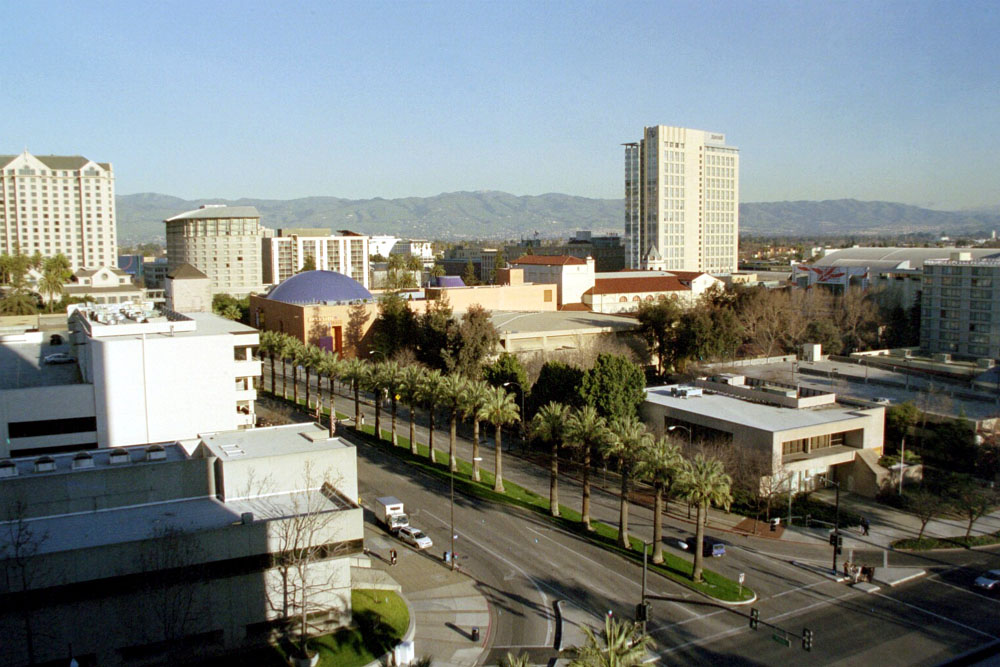
Downtown San Jose looking over the Tech Museum towards Mount Hamilton; hills in the background show their winter green color.

A. P. Hamann (nicknamed "Dutch") became city manager in 1950. At the time, the city had a population of 95,280 and a total area of only 17 square miles (44 km^{2}). Hamann instituted an aggressive growth program by annexation of adjacent areas, such as Alviso and Cambrian Park, and a program of dispersed urbanization, called urban sprawl. Hamann also spent significant time on the East Coast, selling San Jose as an ideal place for businesses to expand into. Hamann's efforts resulted in an annual population growth rate of over eight percent. When Hamann left office in 1969, San Jose had grown to 495,000 residents and 136 square miles.

The costs of uncontrolled growth—high municipal debt load, deteriorating public services (including double sessions at public schools and overtaxed fire and police services), and environmental degradation—triggered a populist revolt against Hamann's growth machine. In the late 1960s, several anti-growth candidates were elected to the City Council. Seeing the writing on the wall, Hamann retired. In 1971, Norman Mineta—who had been appointed to fill a vacant City Council seat by pro-growth Mayor Ron James but who proved to be an independent—was elected Mayor. During the early 1970s, a feminist-environmentalist electoral alliance consolidated a liberal, anti-growth majority on the City Council. In a final coup against the growth machine, voters elected Janet Gray Hayes as mayor in 1974. Since then, San Jose has been governed by a liberal-managerial regime focused on growth management, neighborhood services, and fiscal solvency.

Subsequently, the city adopted a general plan that established an "urban service area" (also known as "urban growth boundary") within existing city boundaries, limited development in the eastern foothills, and deferred growth in Coyote Valley to the south. To the west, communities such as Campbell and Cupertino had incorporated as cities to avoid being annexed to San Jose, while expansion to the north was impossible because of San Francisco Bay. The city also adopted more rigorous planning practices and a "pay-as-you-grow" system of paying for new infrastructure. However, San Jose's new policies did not stop or even significantly restrict growth; rather, they directed growth towards incorporated areas and mitigated the costs of growth. The city's housing stock and population steadily increased during subsequent decades.

Indeed, continued growth has created enormous challenges for the city and region. With the boom of the electronics industry, specifically personal computers and integrated circuits, the population of San Jose and Silicon Valley continued to grow rapidly. By 1980, the city's population was 629,442; it reached 782,248 by 1990; and at which point Santa Clara County as a whole had grown to 1,682,585 residents. Because of rapid job growth and in-migration, housing costs in San Jose and the rest of the Bay Area rose faster than the national average in the 1980s and 1990s; between 1976 and 2001, San Jose's housing costs increased by 936%, the fastest growth in the nation over that time. The average 2003 home price in Santa Clara County was approximately 330% of the national average.

In August 1989, San Francisco was surpassed for the first time in population by San Jose, and San Francisco is now the second largest city in the San Francisco Bay Area in population after San Jose.

In the early 1990s, San Jose and Santa Clara valley had received a heavy dose of negative press as a poorly planned and troubled suburban community, said the November 25, 1991 Time magazine article: "How gray is my valley" part of the special issue on California: The Endangered Dream. In response, the city has tried to direct growth inward and densify already urbanized areas. In 1994, the city council approved another general plan with the original 1974 urban growth boundaries intact. In 1998, city voters rejected a ballot measure that would have eased development restrictions in the foothills. Sixty percent of the housing built in San Jose since 1980 and over three-quarters of the housing built since 2000 have been multifamily structures, reflecting an orientation towards smart growth planning principles.

== Landmark status ==
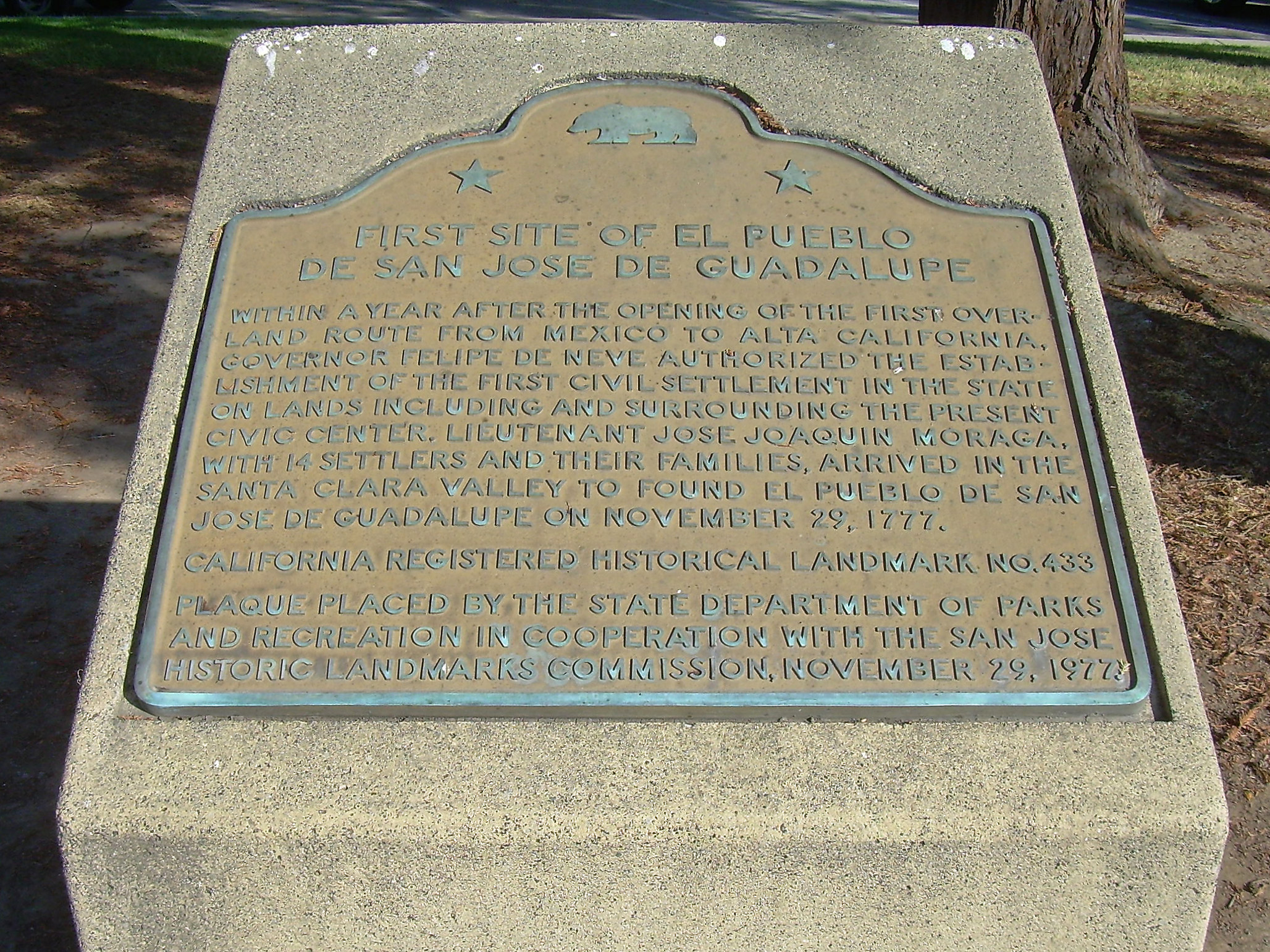
First Site of El Pueblo de San José de Guadalupe

On March 16, 1949, the State Historic Preservation Office designated the First Site of El Pueblo de San Jose de Guadalupe as a California historical landmark #433. A description on the commemorative plaque reads: "Within a year after the opening of the first overland route from Mexico to Alta California, Governor Felipe de Neve authorized establishment of California's first civil settlement. Lieutenant José Joaquín Moraga arrived in the Santa Clara Valley with 14 settlers and their families on November 29, 1777 to found El Pueblo de San José de Guadalupe near the present civic center."

== See also ==
- Bibliography of California history
- San Jose, California
  - List of city managers of San Jose, California
  - List of streets in San Jose, California, with name origins
  - Mayor of San Jose
  - Timeline of San Jose, California
- Las Californias
  - Alta California
  - List of ranchos of California
  - Population of Native California
- History of California
  - History of California before 1900
- Spanish colonial pueblos and villas in North America
