= David J. Powers =

Wisconsin pioneer

D. J. Powers

Member of the Wisconsin State Assembly from the Jefferson 5th district
- In office January 3, 1853 – January 2, 1854
- Preceded by: District established
- Succeeded by: Darius Reed

Personal details
- Born: June 3, 1814 Athens, Vermont, U.S.
- Died: February 11, 1909 (aged 94) Chicago, Illinois, U.S.
- Cause of death: Accidental fall
- Resting place: Graceland Cemetery, Chicago
- Party: Whig
- Spouse: Eliza Ann Harris (died 1888)
- Children: William Penn Powers^{(b. 1842; died 1928)}; Frank A. Powers^{(b. 1853; died 1922)}

David Johnson Powers (June 3, 1814 – February 11, 1909) was an American businessman and Wisconsin pioneer. He was one of the founders of Whitewater, Wisconsin, and Palmyra, Wisconsin, and served in the Wisconsin State Assembly, representing southeast Jefferson County in the 1853 session. His name was often abbreviated as D. J. Powers.

== Biography ==
David J. Powers was born in Athens, Vermont, in 1814. He had a common school education and apprenticed as a machinist before emigrating west to the Wisconsin Territory in 1838. He first arrived at the village of Milwaukee, and there met Willard B. Johnson, who convinced him to settle in the area that would later become Whitewater, Wisconsin.

He was one of the earliest settlers in that region, and bought a large tract of land in what is now the town of Cold Spring, Wisconsin. He worked with two other settlers, Richard Hoppin and Dr. James Tripp, to establish the first grist mill in the area in 1839. The next year, Dr. Tripp proposed to establish a village at the confluence of Whitewater Creek and Spring Brook, and offered Powers a free piece of land in the proposed village to operate a hotel. The men summoned another nearby settler, Prosper Cravath, to assist in surveying and platting the land. The settlement was soon established, and Powers built and operated the first hotel in Whitewater.

Later that year, Powers was appointed the first postmaster at Whitewater by President Martin Van Buren. But he quickly turned to new projects. In 1842, he bought a site for a mill in the neighboring town of Palmyra, and then platted a site which became the village Palmyra. He was then appointed postmaster at Palmyra and served two terms as chairman of the town board of supervisors.

In 1852, he was elected to the Wisconsin State Assembly from Jefferson County's 5th Assembly district, comprising the southeast corner of the county. He served only one term in the Assembly, and afterward moved to Madison, Wisconsin, where he operated a general store. He also took over publication of the Wisconsin Farmer, a monthly magazine for agricultural interests, and became a major shareholder in the Madison Mutual Insurance Co., serving as president for a number of years. During that time he was also active in the State Agricultural Society and the management of the Wisconsin State Fair.

He moved to Chicago, Illinois, in 1868 and founded the Union Wire Mattress company there. He continued running the company until his retirement at age 91, in 1903.

David J. Powers died at his home on Lincoln Avenue in Chicago on February 11, 1909. His death resulted from injuries he sustained when he fell down a set of stairs at his home three weeks earlier.

== Personal life and family ==
David J. Powers married Eliza Ann Harris, a native of New Hampshire. They had at least two sons.

Their elder son, William, enlisted in the Union Army and served with the 1st Wisconsin Heavy Artillery Regiment and was subsequently commissioned as a first lieutenant with the 4th Independent Battery Wisconsin Light Artillery. After the war, he graduated from the University of Wisconsin and went on to a successful business career.

== Published works ==
- Powers, D. J.; Skinner, E. W., eds. (1856). The Wisconsin Farmer and Northwestern Cultivator. Vol. VIII. Powers and Skinner.
- Powers, D. J.; Hoyt, J. W., eds. (1857). The Wisconsin Farmer and Northwestern Cultivator. Vol. IX. Powers and Skinner.
- Powers, D. J.; Hoyt, J. W.; Sampson Hoyt, E. O., eds. (1858). The Wisconsin Farmer and Northwestern Cultivator. Vol. X. Powers and Hoyt.
- Powers, D. J.; Hoyt, J. W.; Sampson Hoyt, E. O., eds. (1859). The Wisconsin Farmer and Northwestern Cultivator. Vol. XI. Powers and Hoyt.
- Powers, D. J.; Hoyt, J. W.; Sampson Hoyt, E. O., eds. (1860). The Wisconsin Farmer and Northwestern Cultivator. Vol. XII. Powers and Hoyt.
- Illustrated Catalogue of the Union Wire Mattress Co. Chicago: Union Wire Mattress Co. 1881.

Wisconsin State Assembly
| New district established (1852 Wisc. Act 499) | Member of the Wisconsin State Assembly from the Jefferson 5th district January 3, 1853 – January 2, 1854 | Succeeded by Darius Reed |
