= Prosper Cravath =

Wisconsin pioneer

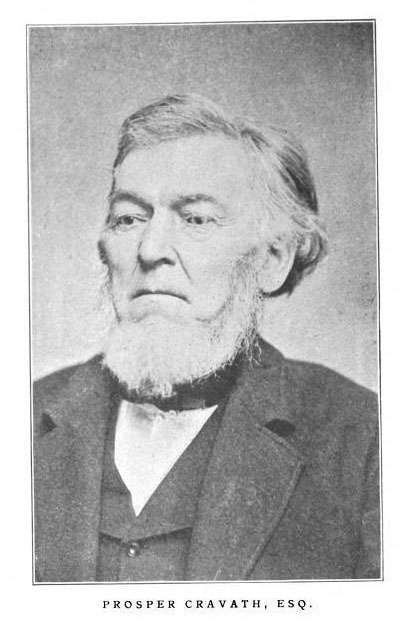

Member of the Wisconsin State Assembly from the Walworth 2nd district
- In office June 5, 1848 – January 1, 1849
- Preceded by: District established
- Succeeded by: Enos Hazard

Personal details
- Born: May 28, 1809 Cortland, New York, U.S.
- Died: May 20, 1886 (aged 76) Whitewater, Wisconsin, U.S.
- Resting place: Oak Grove Cemetery, Whitewater, Wisconsin
- Party: Republican; Whig (before 1854)
- Spouse: Maria Prudence Noble (m. 1834–1886)
- Children: Emma (Rice)^{(b. 1834; died 1886)}; Pitt Noble Cravath^{(b. 1844; died 1898)}

Prosper Cravath, Jr., (May 28, 1809 – May 20, 1886) was an American lawyer and Wisconsin pioneer. He was one of the original settlers of Whitewater, Wisconsin, and helped lay out the town plat. He represented Whitewater in the Wisconsin State Assembly during the 1st Wisconsin Legislature (1848). He is the namesake of Cravath Lake in Whitewater.

== Biography ==
Cravath was born in Cortland, New York, on May 28, 1809. He read law in the office of a prominent lawyer in Cortland for two years, but abandoned the study to pursue other work. He moved to Huron County, Ohio, sometime in the 1830s. In March 1839, he came to the town of Lima, in Rock County, Wisconsin Territory, near the site that would become the city of Whitewater, Wisconsin. He was soon joined by his parents and other family. During 1839, he participated in the first lawsuit in what would become the town of Whitewater, though he was not yet a practicing attorney. He was counsel for the plaintiff in a dispute over compensation for labor, and won the case for his client, William Birge.

In August 1840, the neighboring town was formalized and named "Whitewater" by an act of the territorial legislature. Later that year, he was summoned by Dr. James Tripp for his expertise to survey the site of a planned village in the neighboring town. Together with David J. Powers, who planned to set up a hotel in the new village, the men devised a plat for a settlement that would become the city of Whitewater. He became a large landowner in the new village and later sold dozens of lots for residential and commercial use.

During this time, he resumed the study of law; he was admitted to the Wisconsin bar in 1843 and set up a legal practice. He moved into the town of Whitewater in 1845 and served eight terms on the town board of supervisors in the 1840s, 1850s, and 1860s.

On February 1, 1848, the people ratified the Constitution of Wisconsin and elected representatives to the 1st Wisconsin Legislature. Prosper Cravath was elected to the Wisconsin State Assembly as representative of Walworth County's 2nd Assembly district–then comprising the towns of Whitewater, Richmond, and La Grange, in the northwest corner of the county. At the time, he was a member of the Whig Party. Rather than run for re-election in 1848, he ran for county judge, but was defeated. He subsequently ran for district attorney in 1850, but lost again. Like many northern Whigs, he became a member of the Republican Party when that party was organized in the 1850s. He did not run for state office again, but was appointed postmaster at Whitewater under President Ulysses S. Grant.

During the Civil War, he was a member of the county committee to assist in raising volunteers for the Union Army. Later in life, he helped organize the Historical Society of Walworth County. He served several years as an officer of the society, and contributed his own writings on the early days of Whitewater.

He died at his home in Whitewater on May 20, 1886, after a long illness.

== Personal life and family ==
Prosper Cravath, Jr., was the eldest son of Prosper Cravath, a Presbyterian deacon, and his wife Miriam (née Kinney). Prosper Cravath would ultimately have fifteen siblings.

He married Maria Prudence Noble on March 27, 1834. Maria was a daughter of Solomon Noble, a blacksmith who had served in the Massachusetts House of Representatives. They had two children. Their son, Pitt Cravath, also became a lawyer and was editor and owner of the Whitewater Chronicle. Pitt Cravath also served as a private in the 40th Wisconsin Infantry Regiment during the Civil War and after the war gave two years service to reconstruction in Louisiana as assistant secretary of state.

Wisconsin State Assembly
New state government	Member of the Wisconsin State Assembly from the Walworth 2nd district June 5, 1848 – January 1, 1849	Succeeded by Enos Hazard
