= Caleb S. Blanchard =

19th century American physician

Member of the Wisconsin State Assembly from the Walworth 3rd district
- In office January 5, 1880 – January 3, 1881
- Preceded by: Edwin Coe
- Succeeded by: Lindsey J. Smith

Personal details
- Born: Victory, Cayuga County, New York, U.S.
- Died: November 10, 1893 (aged 75) Dane County, Wisconsin, U.S.
- Resting place: Mazomanie Cemetery, Mazomanie, Wisconsin
- Party: Republican
- Spouses: Susan G. Ames (m. 1852–1860); Jennette D. Park (m. 1861–1893)
- Children: Charles W. Blanchard^{(b. 1864; died 1943)}; Frank P. Blanchard^{(b. 1866; died 1923)}; Estella J. (Trimble)^{(b. 1868; died 1962)}; Albert C. Blanchard^{(b. 1873; died 1909)}
- Education: Pittsfield Medical College
- Profession: physician

Military service
- Allegiance: United States
- Branch/service: United States Volunteers; Union Army
- Years of service: 1862–1863
- Rank: 1st Assistant Surgeon
- Unit: 22nd Reg. Wis. Vol. Infantry
- Battles/wars: American Civil War

Caleb Slye Blanchard (May 8, 1818 – November 10, 1893) was an American physician and politician. He served one term in the Wisconsin State Assembly, representing northeast Walworth County, and served as a surgeon for the Union Army during the American Civil War.

== Biography ==
Blanchard was born on May 8, 1818, in Victory, Cayuga County, New York. He attended the Victor Academy there, then, at age 19, apprenticed as a physician with his older brother Orin W. Blanchard. After three years, he entered the Pittsfield Medical College, in Pittsfield, Massachusetts, to finish his education.

In 1843, he moved to Racine, in the Wisconsin Territory, and established his own medical practice. After a bout of poor health, he left Racine in December 1848 and moved to East Troy, in neighboring Walworth County, Wisconsin. He continued to practice here until his service in the American Civil War.

In 1862, he volunteered for service in with the 22nd Wisconsin Infantry Regiment, which was composed of mostly companies from Racine and Walworth counties. He was enrolled as 1st assistant surgeon and accompanied the regiment for a year. He resigned in July 1863 due to disability.

After the war, he resumed his work in East Troy for another 30 years. Around 1890 he moved west to Mazomanie, Wisconsin, in Dane County, where he died in 1893.

== Political career ==
Blanchard was elected to the Wisconsin State Assembly in 1879 on the Republican ticket. He was an unsuccessful candidate for re-election in 1880—he was defeated by the independent republican candidacy of Lindsey J. Smith. Additionally, he was a member of the East Troy Board of Supervisors and justice of the peace.

== Personal life and family ==
Blanchard's father, Willard Blanchard, served as a captain in the New York Militia during the War of 1812. Caleb Blanchard was one of seven children born to Willard Blanchard and his wife Sallie (née Platt). Two of his brothers also became medical doctors. His brother Orin also moved to the Wisconsin Territory in 1843—he also served as chief surgeon for the 40th Wisconsin Infantry Regiment in the war. Orin's son Charles served as a private in the 22nd Wisconsin Infantry with Caleb Blanchard, and served as hospital steward in the 40th Wisconsin Infantry with his father.

On June 14, 1852, Caleb Blanchard married Susan G. Ames. She died on January 19, 1860. Blanchard later married Jennette D. Park on July 27, 1861. Jennette was a school teacher and principal in East Troy. Caleb and Jennette had four children. Two of their sons, Charles and Albert, also went on to become medical doctors.

== Electoral history ==
Wisconsin Assembly, Walworth 3rd District Election, 1879
Party	Candidate	Votes	%	±%
General Election, November 4, 1879
Republican	Caleb S. Blanchard	1,049	79.95%	+29.77%
Democratic	John Matheson	204	15.55%	
Greenback	Daniel K. Sanford	59	4.50%	
Plurality		845	64.41%	+64.04%
Total votes		1,312	100.0%	-20.68%
Republican hold				

Wisconsin Assembly, Walworth 3rd District Election, 1880
Party	Candidate	Votes	%	±%
General Election, November 2, 1880
Independent Republican	Lindsey J. Smith	709	34.05%	
Republican	Caleb S. Blanchard (incumbent)	679	32.61%	−47.34%
Democratic	John Matheson	666	31.99%	+16.44%
Greenback	George C. Chaffee	28	1.34%	
Plurality		30	1.44%	-62.96%
Total votes		2,082	100.0%	+58.69%
Republican hold				

Wisconsin State Assembly
Preceded by Edwin Coe	Member of the Wisconsin State Assembly from the Walworth 3rd district January 5, 1880 – January 3, 1881	Succeeded by Lindsey J. Smith
