= Edwin Coe =

19th century American politician

Chairman of the Republican Party of Wisconsin
- In office March 1896 – August 1898
- Preceded by: W. A. Jones
- Succeeded by: Joseph B. Treat

Chief Clerk of the Wisconsin State Assembly
- In office January 1885 – January 5, 1891
- Preceded by: Isaac T. Carr
- Succeeded by: George W. Porth
- In office January 11, 1882 – January 1, 1883
- Preceded by: John E. Eldred
- Succeeded by: Isaac T. Carr

Member of the Wisconsin State Assembly from the Walworth 3rd district
- In office January 7, 1878 – January 5, 1880
- Preceded by: William Greening
- Succeeded by: Caleb S. Blanchard

Personal details
- Born: June 11, 1840 Ixonia, Wisconsin Territory
- Died: May 5, 1909 (aged 68) Whitewater, Wisconsin, U.S.
- Resting place: Hillside Cemetery, Whitewater, Wisconsin
- Party: Republican
- Spouse: Emma Ellsworth Spaulding (m. 1865–1909)
- Children: Florence Elsie (Goodhue)^{(b. 1866; died 1928)}; Ellsworth Spaulding Coe^{(b. 1868; died 1933)}; Dwight Bushnell Coe^{(b. 1871; died 1935 )}; Joseph Spaulding Coe^{(b. 1874; died 1896)}; Robert Kirtland Coe^{(b. 1880; died 1952)}
- Relatives: Descendants of Robert Coe
- Education: University of Wisconsin
- Occupation: Newspaper editor, publisher

Military service
- Allegiance: United States
- Branch/service: United States Volunteers; Union Army
- Years of service: 1861–1863
- Rank: Corporal, USV
- Unit: 2nd Reg. Wis. Vol. Infantry; 1st Reg. Wis. Vol. Cavalry
- Battles/wars: American Civil War

Edwin Delos Coe (June 11, 1840 – May 5, 1909) was an American newspaper editor, publisher, and Republican politician. He was a member of the Wisconsin State Assembly, representing northern Walworth County in 1878 and 1879. He subsequently served as chief clerk of the Assembly for four terms and was elected chairman of the Republican Party of Wisconsin in 1896.

== Biography ==
Born in Ixonia, Wisconsin Territory, Coe went to Wayland Academy in Beaver Dam, Wisconsin, and then to University of Wisconsin–Madison. He served in the Union Army during the American Civil War. In 1866, Coe was admitted to the Wisconsin Bar and was the editor of the Whitewater Register. He served in the Wisconsin State Assembly in 1878 and 1879 as a Republican. He then served as chief clerk in the Wisconsin State Assembly in 1882, 1885, 1887, and 1889. He was head of the United States Pension Agency in Milwaukee, Wisconsin for ten years. He was also chairman of the Wisconsin Republican Party Central Committee. He died at his home in Whitewater, Wisconsin.

== Notes ==
Party political offices
| Preceded by Ernst Timme | Republican nominee for Secretary of State of Wisconsin; 1890 | Succeeded by Edwin D. Coe |
| Preceded by Robert W. Jackson | Chairman of the Republican Party of Wisconsin; March 1896 – August 1898 | Succeeded by Joseph B. Treat |
Wisconsin State Assembly
| Preceded by William Greening | Member of the Wisconsin State Assembly from the Walworth 3rd district January 7, 1878 – January 5, 1880 | Succeeded by Caleb S. Blanchard |
| Preceded by John E. Eldred | Chief Clerk of the Wisconsin State Assembly; January 11, 1882 – January 1, 1883 | Succeeded by Isaac T. Carr |
| Preceded by Isaac T. Carr | Chief Clerk of the Wisconsin State Assembly; January 1885 – January 5, 1891 | Succeeded by George W. Porth |
