= William Cochrane =

William Cochrane is the name of:

- William Cochrane (MP) (died 1717), Scottish MP
- William Arthur Cochrane (1926–2017), Canadian physician, pediatrician, academic, and medical executive
- William Avery Cochrane (1842–1929), American politician, soldier and teacher
- William Cochrane, 1st Earl of Dundonald (1605–1685), Earl of Dundonald
- William Cochrane, 3rd Earl of Dundonald, Earl of Dundonald
- William Cochrane, 5th Earl of Dundonald, Earl of Dundonald
- William Cochrane, 7th Earl of Dundonald, Earl of Dundonald
- William Cochrane, Lord Cochrane from Alexander Montgomerie, 9th Earl of Eglinton
- William J. Cochrane (1873–1940), British surveyor and philatelist who signed the Roll of Distinguished Philatelists in 1923

== See also ==
- William Cochran (disambiguation)
