= Cravath Lake =

Lake in Whitewater, Wisconsin

- Location within Wisconsin Location within the United States
- Location: Walworth County, Wisconsin
- Coordinates: 42°49′37″N 88°43′53″W
- Primary inflows: Spring Brook
- Primary outflows: Whitewater Creek
- Basin countries: United States
- Surface area: 70 acres (0.11 sq mi; 0.28 km^{2})
- Max. depth: 10 ft (3.0 m)
- Settlements: Whitewater

Cravath Lake is a freshwater lake located near the center of Whitewater, Wisconsin.

== History ==
Cravath Lake was created in the mid-1850s at the intersection point of Whitewater Creek and Spring Brook to power a gristmill that was built upon the creek. It is named after Prosper Cravath, one of Whitewater's first settlers. Over time the lake's use for industry gave way to recreation, and it currently hosts Cravath Lakefront Park and Community Center on its northern shore near Whitewater's Main Street and downtown businesses.

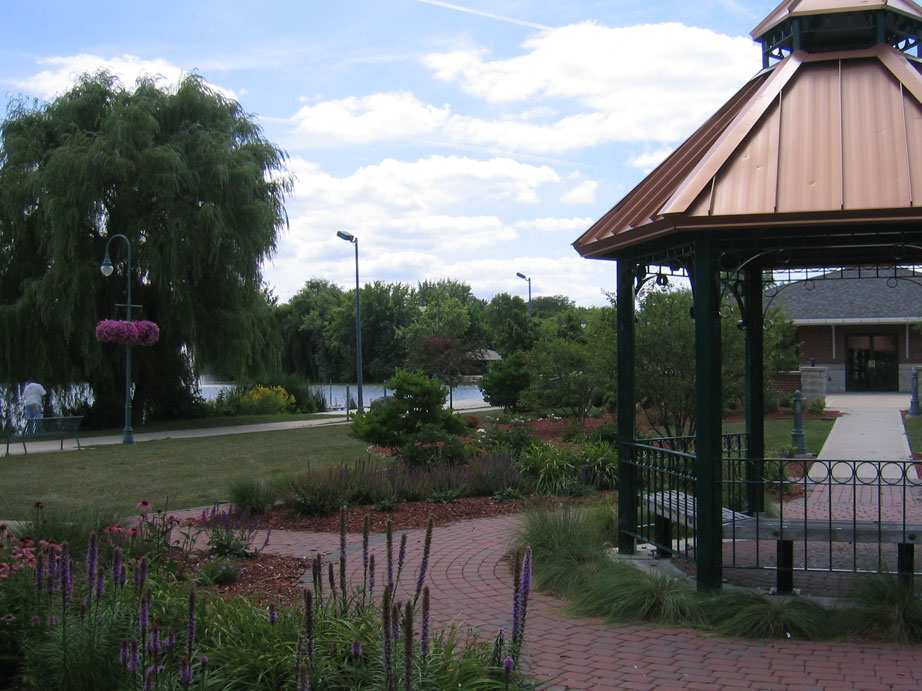
Cravath Lake visible in the background of Cravath Lakefront Park

From 2019 through 2022, the city of Whitewater conducted a drawdown project on both Cravath Lake and its connected Trippe Lake to "freeze out invasive species, restore navigation channels, and improve overall health within the lakes". The draining of the lakes began in July 2019, followed by dredging in the winter of 2022, and a controlled burn to clear vegetation. The lakes were refilled in the spring of 2022, and underwent a fish restocking process in conjunction with the Wisconsin Department of Natural Resources.

== Ecology ==
Cravath Lake hosts panfish, largemouth bass, and northern pike. It contains the invasive species curly-leaf pondweed and eurasian water-milfoil.
