= W. C. Bailey =

American politician

Member of the California Senate from the 32nd district
- In office January 5, 1891 - January 7, 1895
- Preceded by: E. B. Conklin
- Succeeded by: Reynold Linder

Personal details
- Born: July 27, 1843 Delavan, Wisconsin, U.S.
- Died: February 22, 1915 (aged 71) San Jose, California, U.S.
- Party: Republican
- Spouse: Frances Bass (m. 1875)
- Children: 3

Military service
- Branch/service: United States Army
- Rank: Corporal
- Battles/wars: American Civil War

Willard Chapin Bailey (July 27, 1843 – February 22, 1915) served in the California State Senate for the 32nd district from 1891 to 1895. He served in the Union Army with Company F, 40th Wisconsin Infantry Regiment as a corporal during the American Civil War.

He also was city manager of San Jose, California.
