= Charles W. Childs =

American educator, academic administrator (1844–1922)

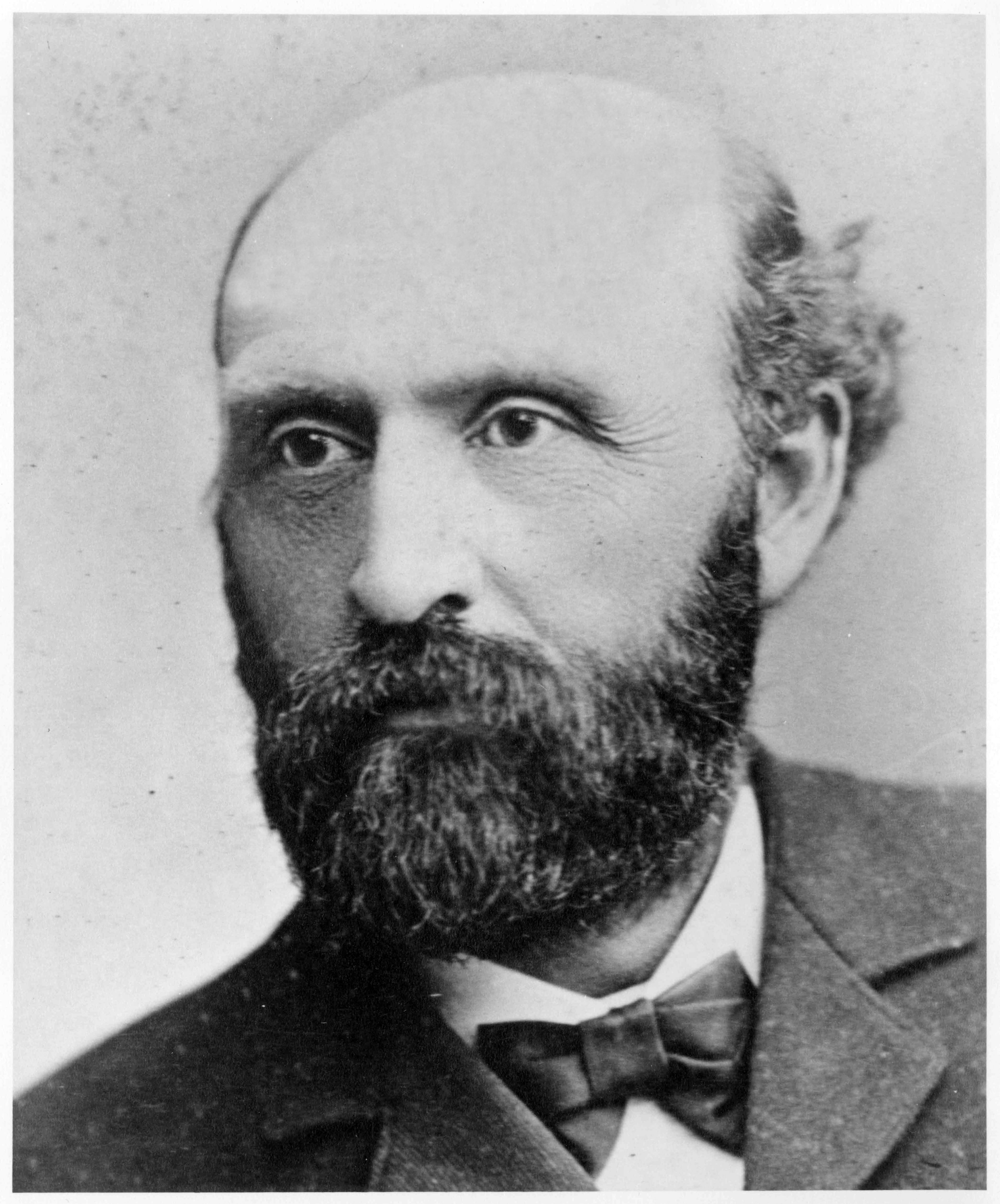

7th Principal of San José State University
- In office June 24, 1889 – July 27, 1896
- Preceded by: Charles H. Allen
- Succeeded by: Ambrose Randall

Personal details
- Born: August 24, 1844 Geneseo, New York, U.S.
- Died: April 29, 1922 (aged 77) Oakland, California, U.S.
- Spouse: Ellen Childs
- Children: 3
- Education: San Jose State University (Dip. Ed); Heald College (Dip.)

Charles Wesley Childs (August 24, 1844 – April 29, 1922) was an American educator and academic administrator. He taught classes and served in administrative roles across the U.S. State of California, most notably becoming the Principal of the California State Normal School (now San Jose State University).

== Early life and military service ==
Charles Wesley Childs was born in Geneseo, New York, on August 24, 1844. After graduating from primary school in 1960 in Wauwatosa, Wisconsin, his family then moved to Clark County, Missouri. At the outbreak of the American Civil War, he enlisted with a company of volunteers which protected emigrant trails to California. After the company disbanded, he moved to Placerville, California, where he became a first lieutenant and quartermaster of the Second Infantry Battalion, Fourth Brigade, of the California Militia. It was around this time that he began his teaching career, teaching at Cold Springs, in El Dorado County.

At the conclusion of the Civil War in 1866, he enrolled in the California State Normal School (now San Jose State University), becoming the school's first veteran student. He graduated in 1877, and then proceeded to complete a course at Heald's Business College in San Francisco.

== Career ==
After completing his education, Childs was hired to reform the schools in Suisin City, and later founded and served as principal for a high school there. In both 1874 and 1876, he was elected to be the superintendent of public education in Solano County, which bolstered his reputation as both a teacher and an administrator.

In 1878, Childs was hired by his alma mater, the California State Normal School to head the history, civil government and bookkeeping departments. He served in this position until 1889, when he was elected to replace the retiring Charles H. Allen as principal of the school. Childs was the first graduate of the California State Normal School to become its Principal.

As Principal of the school, he reformed the grading system, and expanded the school's capacity for manual training, including the construction of a new building. In 1891, in response to declining male enrollment at the institution, he called for the formation of an athletics department to sponsor a football team, which would begin competition in 1892 under James E. Addicott. The athletics department he founded would ultimately become the San Jose State Spartans.

Towards the end of his tenure as principal, Childs advocated for the adoption of a fourth year of coursework for the students, citing the increased demand for highly qualified teachers. A fourth year of coursework was implemented by his successor, Ambrose Randall.

Childs was dismissed as the principal of the California State Normal School on July 27, 1896, at the behest of California Governor James Budd, with whom Childs had an antagonistic relationship. Childs was replaced by Ambrose Randall, who was a friend of Budd's, though Childs was allowed to remain as a faculty member. While a faculty member, he became the became the President of the California Teachers Association for the 1898 year. In 1898, he was reconsidered for the principalship of the state normal school, however, he only received a single vote.

== Later life and death ==
After leaving San Jose in 1909, Childs moved to Oakland, where he taught classes and eventually became the City Superintendent of Schools in Oakland. He served in this capacity until 1916 when he retired due to his age. After his retirement, Childs purchased two orchards, one in San Jose and one in Napa Valley, and founded an organization for California prune growers. In his final years, he assisted in the creation of the St. Helena, Vineland, Spring Valley, and Lodi school districts. He declined serving as the president of any of those school districts, instead selling his farms and moving back to Oakland.

After a brief illness, Charles W. Childs died in Oakland, on April 29, 1922.
