= Edward E. Merritt =

19th century American politician

Member of the Wisconsin State Assembly from the Clark–Jackson district
- In office January 6, 1873 – January 5, 1874
- Preceded by: Eustace L. Brockway
- Succeeded by: Mark Douglas

Personal details
- Born: February 3, 1845 Burlington, Vermont, U.S.
- Died: August 3, 1895 (aged 50) Greensburg, Indiana, U.S.
- Resting place: Ottumwa Cemetery, Ottumwa, Iowa
- Party: Republican
- Spouse: Martha Ann Williams
- Children: Mabel May Merritt^{(b. 1872; died 1963)}; Maude Merritt^{(b. 1876; died 1956)}; Edgar Charles Merritt^{(b. 1878; died 1935)}

Military service
- Branch/service: United States Volunteers; Union Army
- Years of service: 1864
- Rank: Private, USV
- Unit: 40th Reg. Wis. Vol. Infantry
- Battles/wars: American Civil War

Edward Eleazer Merritt (February 3, 1845 – August 3, 1895) was an American newspaper publisher and Republican politician. He was a member of the Wisconsin State Assembly, representing Clark and Jackson counties during the 1873 session.

== Biography ==
Edward Merritt was born in Burlington, Vermont, in February 1845. As a child, he came to Wisconsin with his parents in 1850.

He came to Sparta, Wisconsin, in 1859 and learned the typography trade while working at the Sparta Herald. He then went to La Crosse, Wisconsin, where he worked as a printer.

While living in La Crosse in 1864, he answered President Lincoln's call for "100-day volunteers" for the Union Army to finish the American Civil War. He served as a private in Company G of the 40th Wisconsin Infantry Regiment. The 40th Wisconsin Infantry was sent to Memphis, Tennessee, to guard railroad and supply lines. While there, Memphis came under attack in a raid by Confederate cavalry in what's known as the Second Battle of Memphis. The 40th responded to the raid, chasing the cavalry from the city. They pursued the rebels after they fled, but did not catch them. The regiment expired at the end of its 100-day enlistment and returned to Wisconsin in September.

After the war, Merritt returned to La Crosse, but moved to Neillsville, Wisconsin, in Clark County, in 1867. He started the Clark County Journal with J. S. Dore, working as associate editor, but left after a few months and moved to St. Louis, Missouri. He returned to Neillsville in the fall of that year, where he started another newspaper, the Clark County Republican. He operated the Republican until 1874, when he sold to Charles J. Cooper.

From 1869 to 1872, he served as a deputy United States marshal. In 1872, he won his only term in the legislature, running on the Republican Party ticket. He served in the 26th Wisconsin Legislature and his district comprised all of Clark and Jackson counties. He did not run for re-election in 1873.

== Personal life and family ==
Edward Merritt married Martha Ann Williams and had at least three children. Merritt died at Greensburg, Indiana, in August 1895.

== Electoral history ==
=== Wisconsin Assembly (1872) ===
Wisconsin Assembly, Clark–Jackson District Election, 1872
Party	Candidate	Votes	%	±%
General Election, November 5, 1872
Republican	Edward E. Merritt	1,365	57.40%	−8.94%
Independent	Benjamin F. French	1,013	42.60%	
Plurality		352	14.80%	-17.88%
Total votes		2,378	100.0%	+54.22%
Republican hold				

Wisconsin State Assembly
Preceded by Eustace L. Brockway	Member of the Wisconsin State Assembly from the Clark–Jackson district January 6, 1873 – January 5, 1874	Succeeded by Mark Douglas
