= 40th Wisconsin Infantry Regiment =

Union Army infantry regiment

- Flag of Wisconsin
- Active: June 14, 1864 – September 16, 1864
- Country: United States
- Allegiance: Union
- Branch: Infantry
- Size: Regiment
- Engagements: American Civil War: Second Battle of Memphis

Commanders
- Colonel: W. Augustus Ray

The 40th Wisconsin Infantry Regiment was a volunteer infantry regiment that served in the Union Army during the American Civil War. It was among scores of regiments that were raised in the summer of 1864 as Hundred Days Men, an effort to augment existing manpower for an all-out push to end the war within 100 days.

== Service ==
The 40th Wisconsin was organized at Madison, Wisconsin, and mustered into Federal service on June 14, 1864.

The regiment was mustered out on September 16, 1864.

== Casualties ==
The 40th Wisconsin suffered 1 officer and 18 enlisted men who died of disease, for a total of 19 fatalities.

== Notable people ==
- W. C. Bailey was corporal in Co. F. After the war he became a California state legislator and city manager of San Jose, California.
- James M. Bingham was major of the regiment. After the war he became the 20th speaker of the Wisconsin State Assembly and the 13th Lieutenant Governor of Wisconsin.
- Charles H. Allen was the captain of Company D. After the war, he became the founding Principal of the University of Wisconsin–Platteville, and a Principal of San Jose State University.
- Orrin W. Blanchard, the brother of Caleb S. Blanchard, was surgeon of the regiment.
- William Avery Cochrane was a private in Co. B. After the war he became a Wisconsin state legislator.
- Alexander J. Craig was adjutant of the regiment. After the war he became the 8th Superintendent of Public Instruction of Wisconsin.
- Pitt Noble Cravath, son of Prosper Cravath, was a private in Co. D.
- Samuel Fallows was lieutenant colonel of the regiment and later served as colonel of the 49th Wisconsin Infantry Regiment. Earlier in the war, he was chaplain of the 32nd Wisconsin Infantry Regiment. After the war he became the 9th Superintendent of Public Instruction of Wisconsin and Presiding Bishop of the Reformed Episcopal Church.
- M. H. Fisk was a private in Co. E. After the war he became the first mayor of De Pere, Wisconsin.
- Edward E. Merritt was a private in Co. G. After the war he became a Wisconsin state legislator.
- John Coit Spooner was a private in Co. D. After the war he became a United States Senator.
- Jesse B. Thayer was a private in Co. C. He later served in Co. D, 49th Wisconsin Infantry Regiment, and rose to the rank of sergeant. After the war he became a Wisconsin legislator and the 13th Superintendent of Public Instruction of Wisconsin.

== See also ==
- List of Wisconsin Civil War units
- Wisconsin in the American Civil War

== Popular culture ==
- "Welcome Song of the 40th Wisconsin Volunteers" Words by Lt. S. Fillmore Bennett, 1864, music by T. Martin Towne.
