= William Cochran =

William Cochran may refer to:

- William Cochran (artist) (1738–1785), Scottish painter
- William Cochran (Nova Scotia politician) (1751–1820), Irish-born merchant and political figure in Nova Scotia
- William Cochran (priest) (1757–1833), Canadian clergyman and president of University of King's College
- William Cochran (physicist) (1922–2003), British physicist
- William Cochran (Indiana politician) (1934–2019), American politician and businessman
- William Cochran (tenor) (1943–2022), American operatic tenor
- William D. Cochran (1894–1951), American football player
- William D. Cochran (born 1950), American astronomer
- William Gemmell Cochran (1909–1980), British-American statistician
- William Granville Cochran (1844–1932), American judge and politician
- William Thad Cochran (1937–2019), U.S. senator from Mississippi

== See also ==
- William Cochrane (disambiguation)
