= Palmyra Municipal Airport =

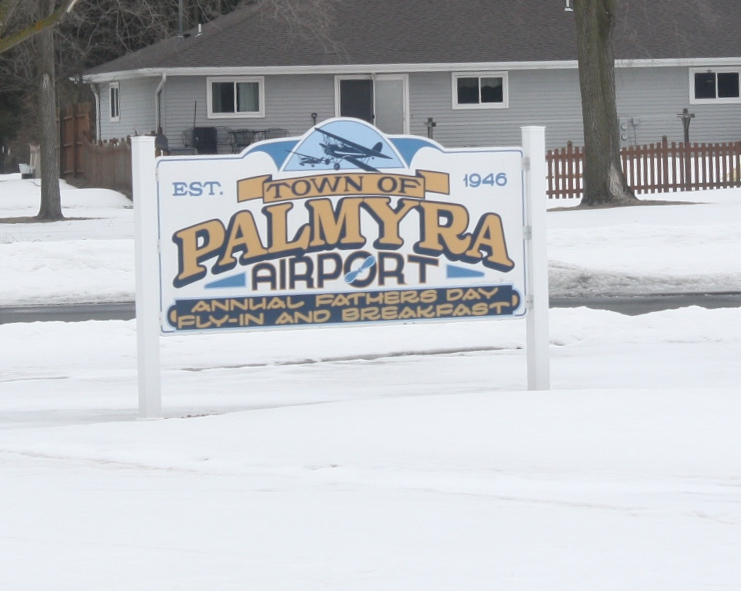
- Airport entrance sign
- IATA: none; ICAO: none; FAA LID: 88C

Summary
- Airport type: Public
- Owner/Operator: Town of Palmyra
- Serves: Palmyra, Wisconsin
- Opened: May 1949
- Time zone: CST (UTC−06:00)
  - Summer (DST): CDT (UTC−05:00)
- Elevation AMSL: 851 ft / 259 m
- Coordinates: 42°53′01″N 088°36′00″W

Map
- Location of airport in Wisconsin 88C (the United States)

Runways
Direction	Length		Surface
Direction	ft	m	Surface
9/27	2,800	853	Turf

Statistics
- Aircraft operations (2022): 14,000
- Based aircraft (2024): 54
- Source: Federal Aviation Administration

Palmyra Municipal Airport (FAA LID: 88C) is a public use airport in Jefferson County, Wisconsin, United States. Owned by and located in the Town of Palmyra, it is also known as Palmyra Airport. It is included in the Federal Aviation Administration (FAA) National Plan of Integrated Airport Systems for 2025–2029, in which it is categorized as a local general aviation facility.

== History ==
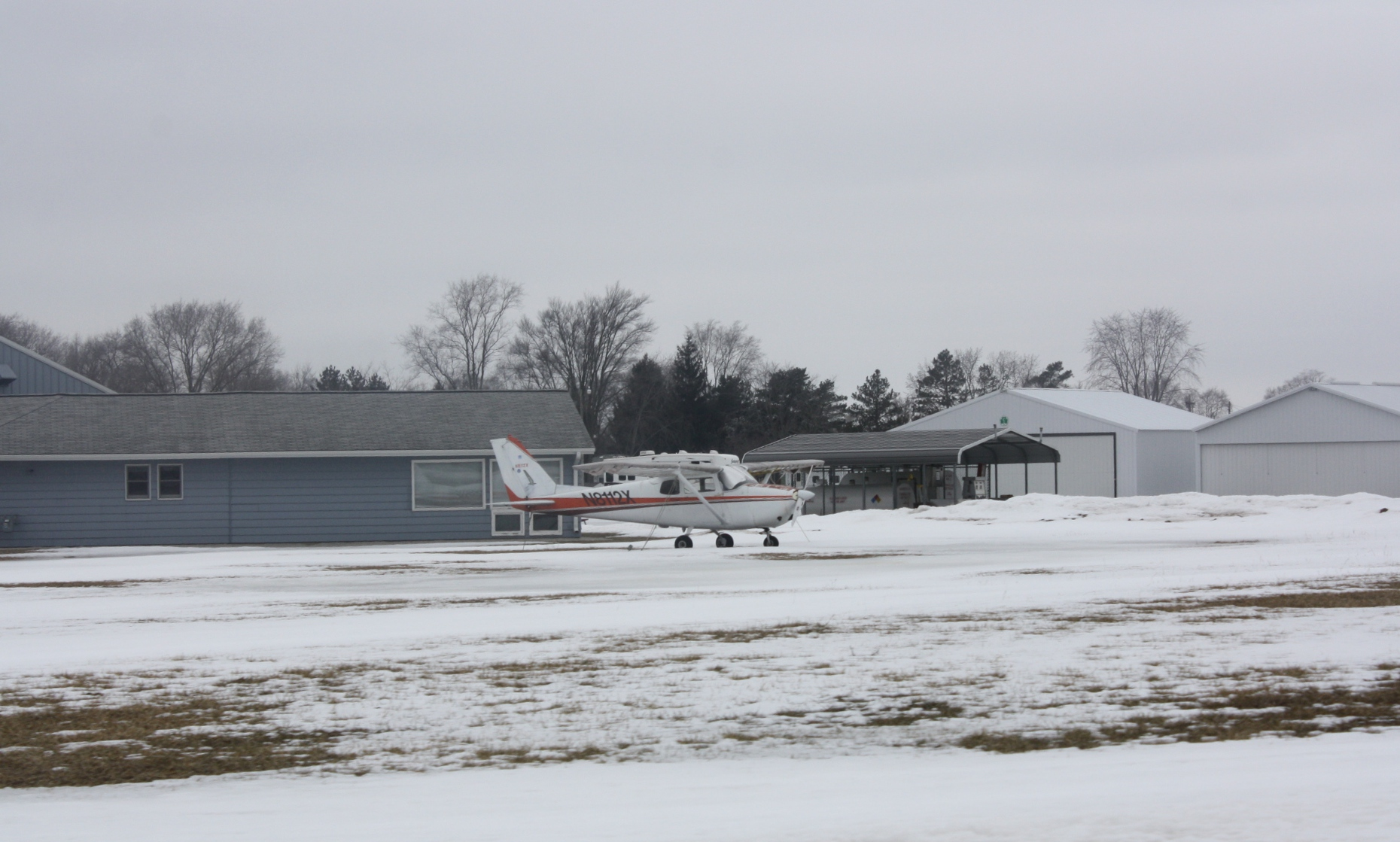
Airplane at airport

Palmyra Municipal Airport has been owned and operated by the town of Palmyra since 1948.

In 2013, the Village of Palmyra proposed annexation of more than 740 acres of property, primarily agricultural land, but also including the Town of Palmyra's town hall and the Palmyra Municipal Airport. The Town of Palmyra is challenging the village's annexation attempt.

== Facilities and aircraft ==
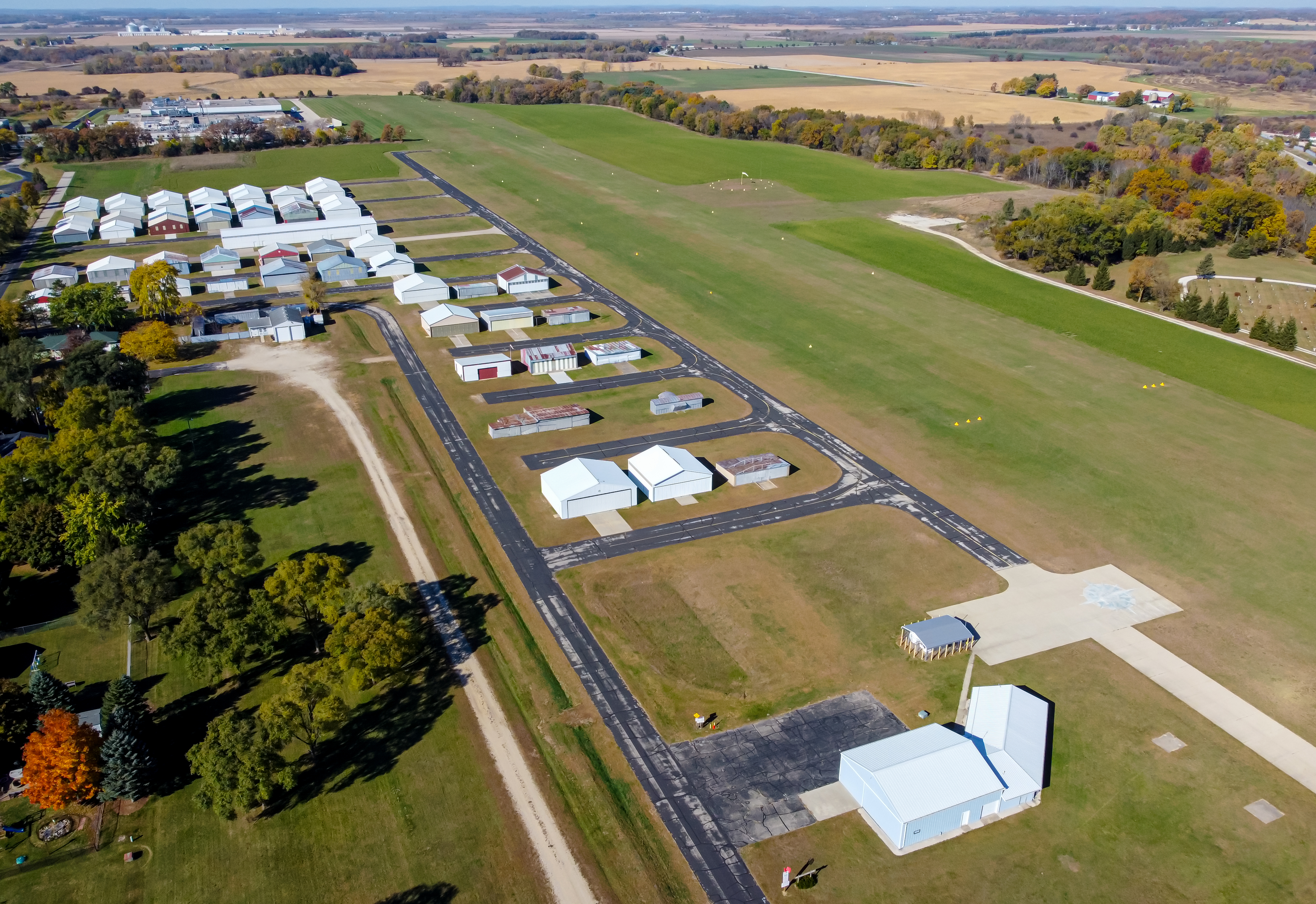

The airport covers an area of 115 acres (46 ha) at an elevation of 851 feet (259 m) above mean sea level. It has one runway designated 9/27 with a turf surface measuring 2,800 by 200 feet (853 x 61 m).

For the twelve month period ending July 22, 2022, the airport had 14,000 general aviation aircraft operations, an average of 38 per day.

In July 2024, there were 54 aircraft based at this airport: 53 single-engine and 1 helicopter.

== See also ==
- List of airports in Wisconsin
