= Charles Herman Allen =

American educator and president of San José State University (1828–1904)

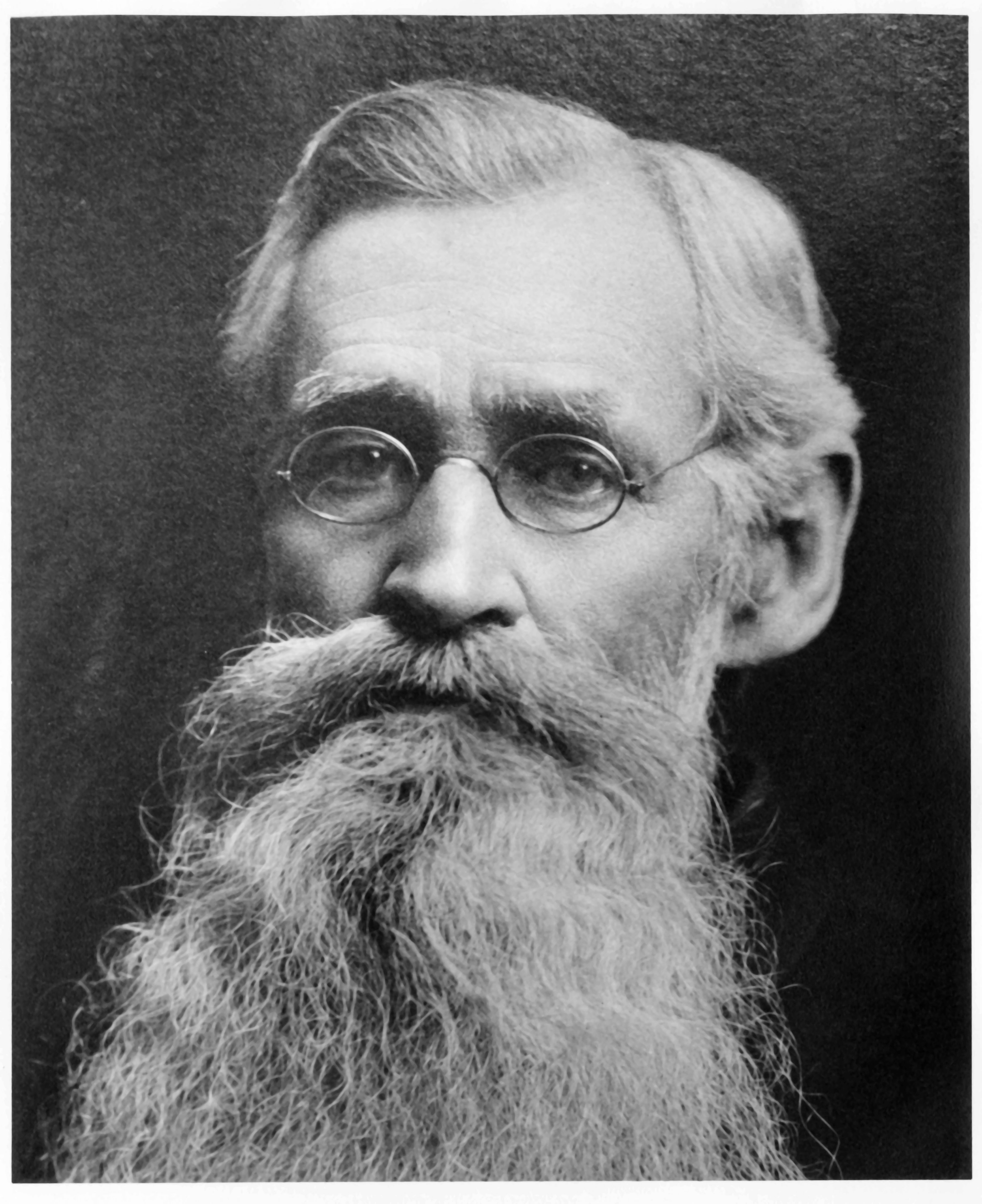

6th Principal of San José State University
- In office August 5, 1873 – June 24, 1889
- Preceded by: William T. Lucky
- Succeeded by: Charles W. Childs

Nominal Principal of the University of California, Los Angeles
- In office August 29, 1882 – May 1883
- Succeeded by: Ira More

1st Principal of the University of Wisconsin–Platteville
- In office October 9, 1866 – 1870

Personal details
- Born: February 11, 1828 Mansfield, Pennsylvania, US
- Died: September 11, 1904 (aged 76) San Jose, California, US
- Resting place: Oak Hill Memorial Park
- Spouse: Abigail Ann Phelps (m. 1854)
- Children: 4

Military service
- Allegiance: United States
- Branch/service: United States Volunteers; Union Army
- Years of service: 1864
- Rank: Captain, USV
- Unit: 40th Reg. Wis. Vol. Infantry
- Battles/wars: American Civil War

Charles Herman Allen (February 11, 1828 – September 11, 1904) was an American educator and academic administrator. He taught classes and served in administrative roles across the U.S. states of New York, Pennsylvania, Massachusetts, Wisconsin, Oregon, and California, most notably becoming the principal of the Platteville Normal School (now the University of Wisconsin–Platteville) and the California State Normal School (now San Jose State University).

== Early life and career ==
Charles Herman Allen was born in Mansfield, Pennsylvania, on February 11, 1828, to parents Almon Allen and Polly Bates. When he was young, a "spinal curve" developed which caused significant damage to his nervous system, and would follow him for the rest of his life. He initially attended common schools of the area, before dropping out of his secondary education after only a single semester due to health issues. Initially, guided by his physicians away from further academic work, he became a cutler, however after a local teacher resigned due to illness, he began teaching for additional income, and found a passion for teaching. He then re-enrolled in secondary education, attending Westfield Academy and earning a New York Teacher's Certificate, while continuing to teach in New York common schools, and work as a cutler during the vacations.

In 1851, he moved to McKean County in Pennsylvania, where he became the principal of a Smethport School. He served as principal until 1854 when a decline in his health necessitated his resignation. His recovery took multiple years, during which he worked as a land surveyor. After his recovery, he became the associate principal of a normal school in West Chester, Pennsylvania.

On June 29, 1854, Allen married Abigail Ann Phelps. The two had four children together.

== University of Wisconsin ==
In the summer of 1859 Allen was invited to Madison, Wisconsin, by Henry Barnard, the Chancellor of the University of Wisconsin, to help organize a series of teachers' institutes designed to further develop prospective educators. Allen initially spent only that summer in Wisconsin before returning to Pennsylvania. However, after Barnard's resignation in 1860, Allen was offered and accepted positions as an agent for the State Board of Normal Regents and as the director of the teachers' institutes at the university.

For the 1860–61 academic year he taught at a private normal and high school in Madison, with the intent to continue running the teachers' institute in the summer, however, at the outbreak of the American Civil War, the teachers' institute program was canceled. Allen then became the Madison school superintendent, working for a $250 annual salary ($8,958 in 2025) on the stipulation that he could continue teaching classes. During this period, Allen first met and mentored John Muir, who would become a prominent environmentalist. The two would become close friends for the rest of their lives, sharing a passion for the natural sciences.

In 1863 the University of Wisconsin saw declining enrollment due to the ongoing Civil War. Allen, as normal regent board member, reasoned that opening the university to women would help alleviate the issue and fought to departmentalize the existing education classes. Several students, alumni, and faculty opposed allowing female enrollment, but on March 16, 1863, the normal department opened anyway, with Allen as principal. In 1930, the normal department he founded would become the University of Wisconsin–Madison School of Education.

Despite its recent founding, the normal department was briefly suspended after the 1863–64 academic year when Allen and 30 of his senior students enlisted in the 40th Wisconsin Infantry Regiment as Hundred Days Men for the still-ongoing Civil War. Allen served as the captain of Company D, which marched to and defended, Memphis, Tennessee.

In January 1865, with his health failing him yet again, Allen issued his resignation from the university. His resignation was initially effective at the end of the school year; however, he stayed an additional semester, leaving the university at the end of the calendar year, 1865. For six months after his resignation, he worked in a life insurance office in Cincinnati, Ohio, before being invited by the State Board of Normal Regents to serve as the first principal of the state's first normal school in Platteville, Wisconsin, an offer he accepted. This school would come to be known as the Platteville Normal School, and later the University of Wisconsin–Platteville.

=== Platteville Normal School ===
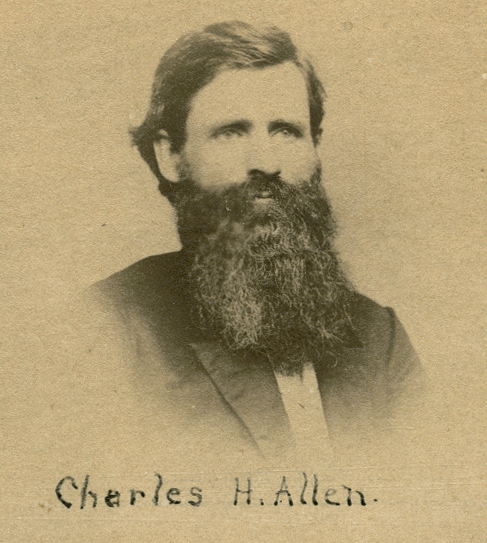
Allen in 1868–69, serving as the Principal of the Platteville Normal School

The Platteville Normal School opened on October 9, 1866, with Allen as one of five full-time faculty members. Attendance was 110 in the first year, with attempts made to solidify the academic foundation of the nascent institution, including the foundation of a literary society and the construction of additional buildings.

He served as the principal of the Platteville Normal School until 1870, when after a severe bronchitis attack, he decided to resign from the position. After his resignation, Allen moved to Portland, Oregon, to again recover his health thinking that the fresh air would benefit him. Once his health permitted, he started teaching classes in Portland, and helped to open the Bishop Scott Grammar School where he would serve as principal. He served as principal there for eight months between 1871 and 1872, before returning to Wisconsin to run a summer teachers' institute.

== California State Normal School ==
On October 7, 1872, Allen was hired by the California State Normal School (currently San Jose State University) in San Jose, California, as a teacher of natural sciences, music, and drawing. Because of his lengthy experiences in other states, he was quickly promoted, first to be the vice-principal in March 1873, and then principal on August 5 of that year. He quickly took a liking to California, chronicling the local plants and reestablishing his friendship with John Muir.

He acted quickly to organize the school and set new goals for the institution. On October 22, 1873, he released a report to the Board of Trustees titled "The Objects and Wants of the Normal School", which outlined his philosophy of a liberal education. The report stated that while in theory, a normal school should only focus on teaching its students how to teach, in practice, a teacher needs to have a strong background of fundamentals in order to properly understand material to then teach. The board unanimously adopted the report, and by November the California State Normal School opened a preparatory department, which gave general education to students who otherwise failed their entrance examinations.

Under Allen's early tenure, the California State Normal School saw great growth, including enrollment tripling to 300 by 1875, the school becoming independent from the San Jose Board of Education, the refounding of the California Teachers Association, and the addition of a 3rd year of coursework for the students.

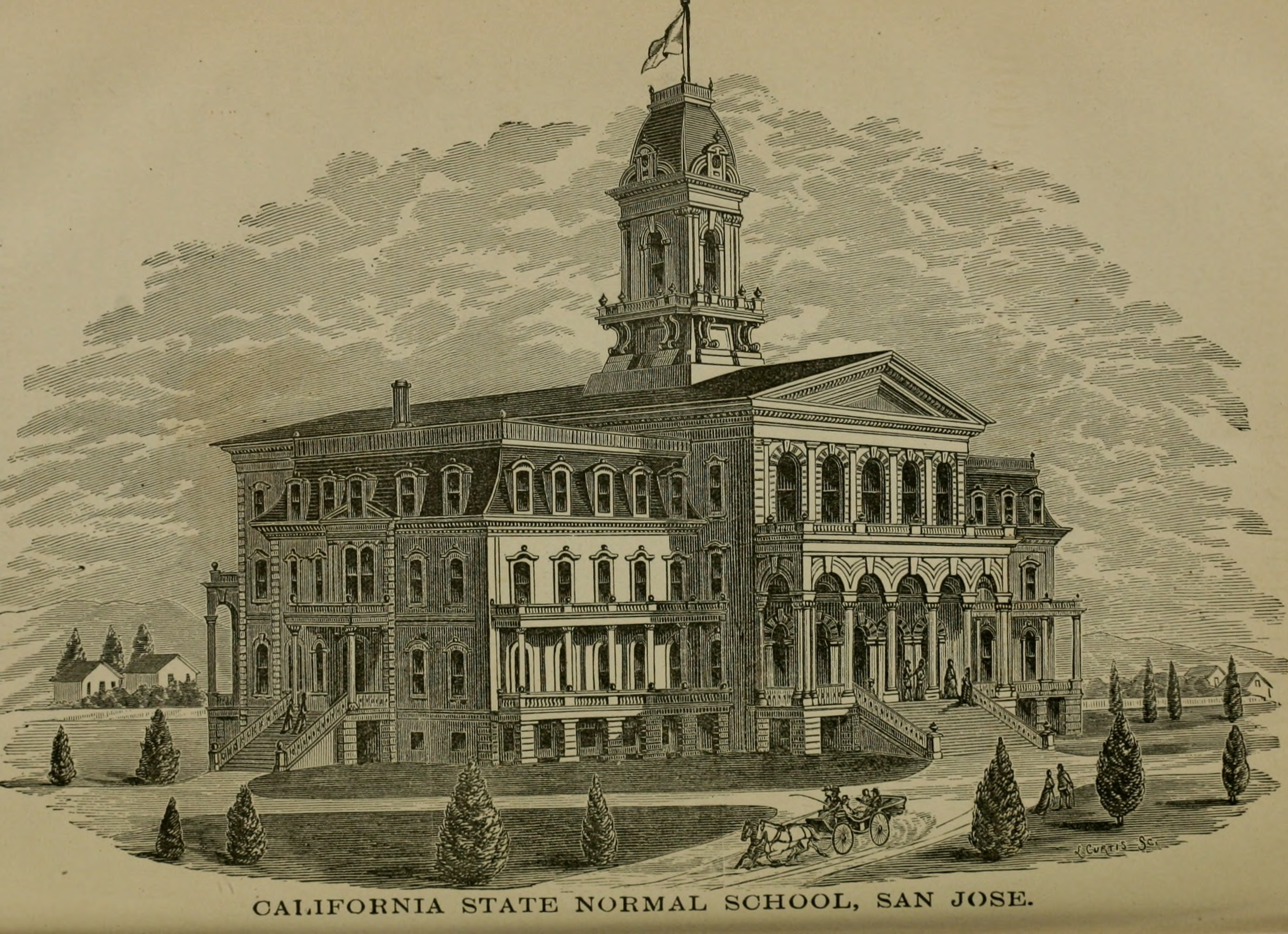
The California State Normal School building that burnt down in 1880, causing debates on whether to relocate the institution

In February 1880, the main building of the State Normal School caught on fire and was destroyed in the ensuing blaze. Allen and the board of trustees traveled to Sacramento, California, to appeal to the California State Legislature to issue $200,000 ($6.67 million in 2025) in emergency funds to finance the construction of a new building. This caused significant debate in the senate about the effectiveness of the school and if it would be better served elsewhere. The California State Senate voted to move the school to Los Angeles, but it was ultimately kept in San Jose after objections by the California State Assembly. The new building was approved with $100,000 in emergency funds and Allen oversaw the construction of the new building alongside architect Levi Goodrich. The building was completed in 1881. During this period, Allen attempted to issue his resignation from the State Normal School, citing the sharp criticism his administration received following the debate over moving the school after the fire, however he was persuaded to remain as principal by the California State Board of Education and the board of trustees.

In January 1881, immediately after the failed attempt to move State Normal School to Los Angeles, California State Senator J.P. West sponsored a bill to create a "Branch State Normal School" in Los Angeles. The bill was passed by both houses, and the southern branch opened in August 1882 with Allen serving as the nominal principal of the institution for its first year. In 1919, the Los Angeles State Normal School became the University of California, Los Angeles.

In 1887, Allen helped to found the Chico State Normal School (which later became California State University, Chico), though the institution was never under administrative control of the San Jose State Normal School.

On April 6, 1889, Allen issued his resignation from the California State Normal School, citing his continued poor health. His successor was Charles W. Childs.

== Later life and death ==
After he retired from the California State Normal School, Allen moved to a fruit ranch in Wrights, California, in the Santa Cruz mountain range, and became a horticulturist. In 1892, he was appointed to be a special agent for the California State Board of Horticulture where he made an agricultural survey of Santa Clara County.

In 1893, he supervised a horticultural educational exhibit that was displayed in the California building at the World's Columbian Exposition in Chicago, Illinois. From 1898 until his death, he served as an assistant postmaster in San Jose.

Allen died on September 11, 1904, in San Jose, California after suffering a lung hemorrhage. His wife, Abigail, died on December 3, 1905, after suffering a broken hip.

== Legacy ==
In his time, Allen was very well regarded by his peers. At his retirement in 1889, the San Jose State Normal School wrote that "California— the whole coast, in fact— owes him a debt of gratitude that can never be repaid." Before his death in 1904, alumni who studied under him at the University of Wisconsin wrote that "Prof. Allen was an inspiration to the teachers for careful, conscientious efforts along their line of work."

In 1960, San Jose State named Allen Hall in his honor, which served as a dormitory building until its demolition in 2003.

In 2007, Allen's home in Platteville contributed to the West Main Street Historic District, which was listed to the National Register of Historic Places.
