= Monta Vista Fault =

California potentially active fault

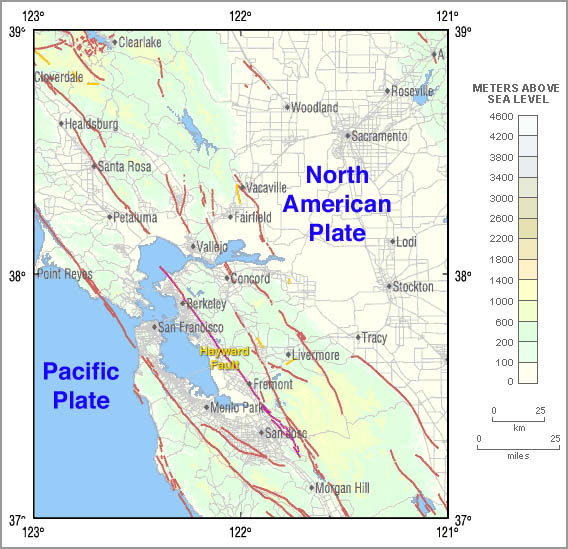
The Monta Vista Fault, south of the San Jose label

The Monta Vista Fault is a potentially active fault, (a fault capable of generating destructive earthquakes) in Santa Clara County, California. It is a relatively short fault that runs between and generally parallel to the much longer San Andreas Fault and Hayward Fault Zones, trending northwest along the eastern foothills of the Santa Cruz Mountains in the Coast Range Geomorphic Province. The most recent activity has been estimated to have been approximately 700,000 years ago. It has a slip rate of 0.4 mm/year. The fault runs through the campus of the Foothill College, meandering from under the child-care center and fine arts building to alongside the campus center and the Carriage House.
