= Enos Hazard =

American politician

Enos J. Hazard (1810-1857) was a member of the Wisconsin State Assembly during the 1849 session. He was a Whig.
