= Palmyra (town), Wisconsin =

Town in Jefferson County, Wisconsin

Palmyra, Wisconsin
- Town
- Town of Palmyra
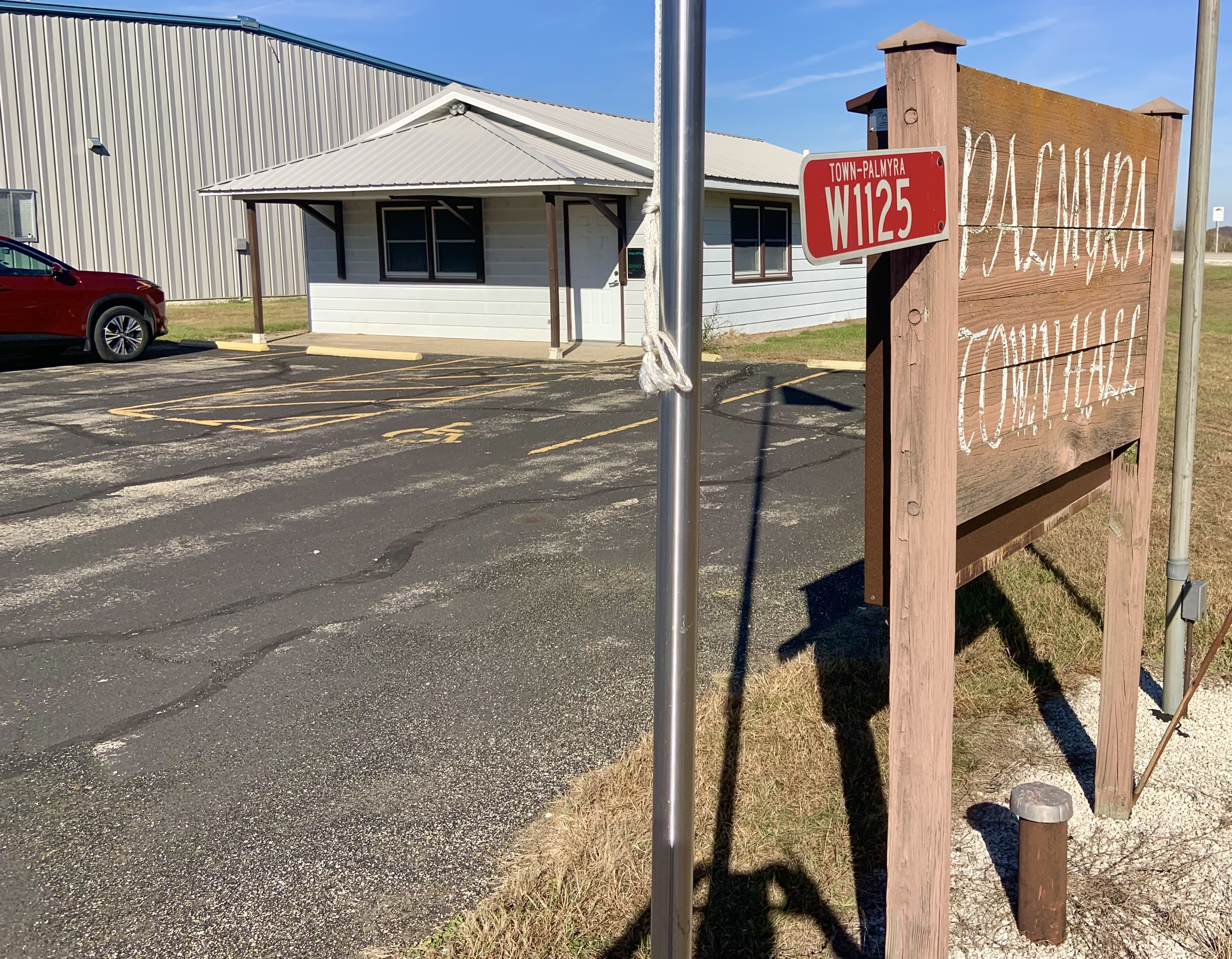
- Palmyra Town Hall

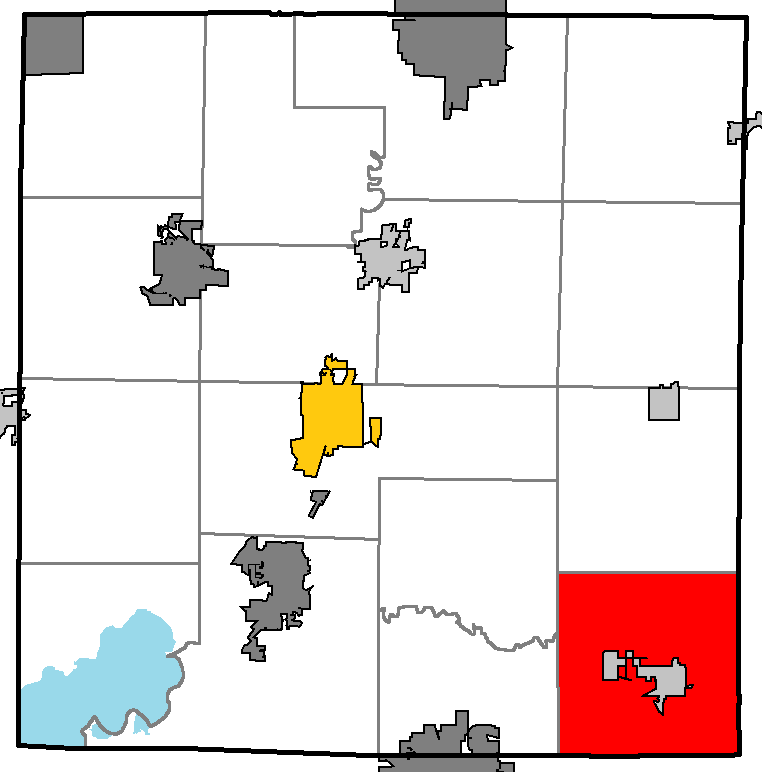
- Location of Palmyra, within Jefferson County

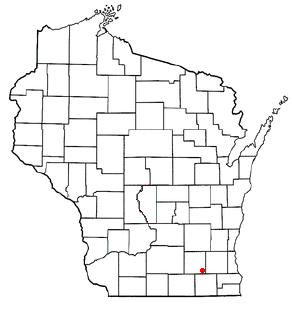
- Location of Palmyra, Wisconsin
- Coordinates: 42°53′04″N 88°36′24″W
- Country: United States
- State: Wisconsin
- County: Jefferson

Area
  - Total: 34.05 sq mi (88.2 km^{2})
  - Land: 33.61 sq mi (87.0 km^{2})
  - Water: 0.44 sq mi (1.1 km^{2})

Population (2020)
  - Total: 1,220
  - Density: 36.3/sq mi (14.0/km^{2})
- Time zone: UTC-6 (Central (CST))
  - Summer (DST): UTC-5 (CDT)
- Area code: 262
- GNIS feature ID: 1583891

Palmyra is a town in Jefferson County, Wisconsin, United States. The population was 1,220 at the 2020 census. The village of Palmyra is surrounded by the town.

== Geography ==
According to the United States Census Bureau, the town has a total area of 35.2 square miles (91.1 km^{2}), of which 34.8 square miles (90.1 km^{2}) is land and 0.4 square mile (1.0 km^{2}) (1.08%) is water.

== Demographics ==
As of the census of 2000, there were 1,145 people, 435 households, and 324 families residing in the town. The population density was 32.9 people per square mile (12.7/km^{2}). There were 512 housing units at an average density of 14.7 per square mile (5.7/km^{2}). The racial makeup of the town was 96.33% White, 0.26% Black or African American, 0.09% Asian, 2.71% from other races, and 0.61% from two or more races. 5.94% of the population were Hispanic or Latino of any race.

There were 435 households, out of which 26.7% had children under the age of 18 living with them, 63.4% were married couples living together, 6.7% had a female householder with no husband present, and 25.3% were non-families. 20.0% of all households were made up of individuals, and 6.0% had someone living alone who was 65 years of age or older. The average household size was 2.63 and the average family size was 3.02.

In the town, the population was spread out, with 22.4% under the age of 18, 8.0% from 18 to 24, 29.1% from 25 to 44, 27.8% from 45 to 64, and 12.8% who were 65 years of age or older. The median age was 39 years. For every 100 females, there were 99.8 males. For every 100 females aged 18 and over, there were 97.6 males.

The median income for a household in the town was $50,375, and the median income for a family was $53,929. Males had a median income of $37,955 versus $29,167 for females. The per capita income for the town was $22,244. About 3.5% of families and 4.9% of the population were below the poverty line, including 10.8% of those under age 18 and none of those age 65 or over.

== History ==
The town of Palmyra was established in 1846, then officially given a village charter on May 5, 1874.

== Transportation ==
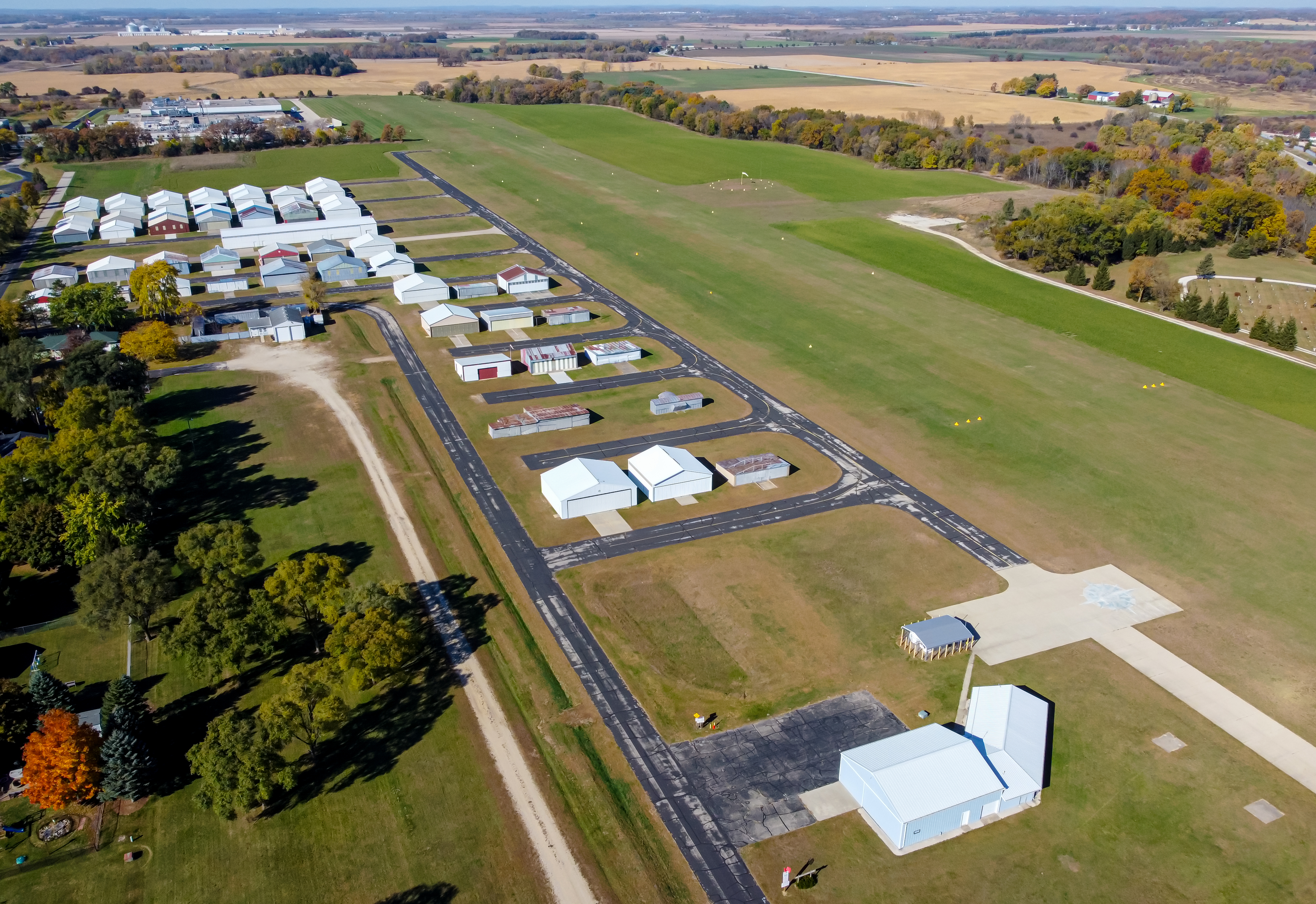
Palmyra Municipal Airport

The Palmyra Municipal Airport was established in the town in 1948. The village of Palmyra voted to annex 740 acres of land into the village, including the over 91 acres occupied by the airport. After town residents petitioned the town board to legally challenge the annexation, the board voted 2–0 in favor of taking the matter to court.
