= A. P. Hamann =

City manager of San Jose, 1950 to 1969

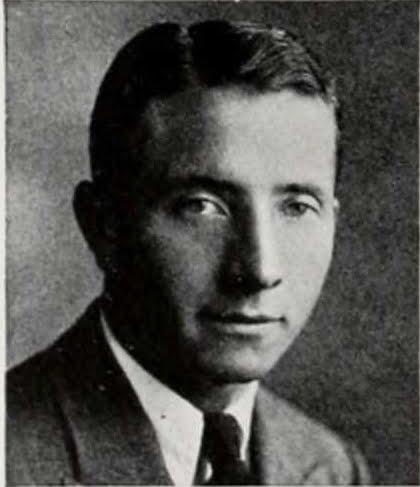
- Hamann in 1933

San Jose City Manager
- In office March 10, 1950 – November 1969
- Preceded by: O. W. Campbell
- Succeeded by: Thomas Fletcher

Vice president of Santa Clara University
- In office 1970–1977

Personal details
- Born: September 26, 1909
- Died: March 27, 1977 (aged 67) Tenerife North Airport, Tenerife, Canary Islands, Spain
- Cause of death: Plane crash
- Spouse: Frances Hamann
- Children: A. P. "Dutch" Hamann
- Education: Santa Clara University
- Occupation: Management
- Profession: Attorney

Anthony P. "Dutch" Hamann (September 26, 1909 – March 27, 1977) was the city manager of San Jose, California, United States, from 1950 to 1969. During his tenure, San Jose grew from a small agriculture-based city of 95,000 residents to a large, economically diverse city of almost 500,000.

In 1977, he was killed in the Tenerife airport disaster.

== Early life and education ==
Hamann attended Bellarmine College Preparatory and was a football player at Santa Clara University. After graduating in 1932, he served as the university's alumni association director before joining the United States Navy during World War II. After the war, Hamann left the Navy as a lieutenant commander, to become a division manager for General Motors.

== Political career ==
On March 10, 1950, Hamann was appointed city manager of San Jose by a 4–3 vote of the city council. His first large project was to pass a bond measure to upgrade and expand the city's sewage system, building a new sewage treatment plant near Alviso. At the time, the city's sewage system was insufficient to handle the large amount of waste produced by the local canneries; Hamann's new plant was designed not just for current demand, but allowed for a significant expansion.

Hamann then directed an aggressive growth program for the city. Growing up in Orange County, Hamann felt that the development of that area, consisting of several mid-sized cities without a dominant city in the region, was a failure and worked to ensure that San Jose became the major city of the Santa Clara Valley. Central to this project were "strip annexations"—Hamann and his staff would determine where new tax-generating developments such as shopping centers were likely to be built, and would annex small strips of territory around the property to ensure no other city could claim the property so that San Jose would receive the sales tax revenue produced by property when it was finally developed.

When industries decided to move into or expand in the area, Hamann would ensure they found a willing partner in the city. IBM wanted to move its research staff out of downtown to a dedicated facility to be sited on unincorporated land south of San Jose, but were being blocked by the Santa Clara County Board of Supervisors. Hamann simply had San Jose annex the proposed site and pushed the project's approval through the city council.

In addition to annexing unincorporated territory, Hamann's staff also annexed existing neighborhoods, including Cambrian Park, and one city. When the city of Alviso attempted to annex the new sewage plant to boost tax revenue, Hamann countered by having San Jose annex Alviso. A special city staff, known as Dutch's Panzer Division, executed 1377 annexations during his time in office—previous to Hamann's administration there had been a total of 42.

== Later life and death ==
In 1969, anti-growth candidates were elected to the city council, and Hamann chose to resign rather than work with a city council opposed to his program. He returned to Santa Clara University as its vice president of development. He was inducted to the SCU sports Hall of Fame. Hamann and his wife Frances died on Pan Am Flight 1736 on March 27, 1977, in the Tenerife airport disaster, a collision of two Boeing 747s in the Canary Islands. This incident remains the worst aviation accident in history.

== See also ==
- List of city managers of San Jose, California
