= William Avery Cochrane =

American politician (1842–1929)

William Avery Cochrane (1842–1929) was a member of the Wisconsin State Assembly.

== Biography ==
Cochrane was born on January 8, 1842, in Ripley, New York. During the American Civil War, he served with the 40th Wisconsin Volunteer Infantry Regiment of the Union Army. In 1867, he graduated from Beloit College and became a teacher at the Wisconsin School for the Deaf. Cochrane died in August 1929.

== Political career ==
Cochrane was elected to the Assembly in 1892. Additionally, he was an alderman and a member of the school board of Delavan, Wisconsin. He was a Republican.
