= Lindsey J. Smith =

19th-century American politician

Lindsey J. Smith was a member of the Wisconsin State Assembly.

== Biography ==
Smith was born on January 8, 1840, in what is now Lafayette, Walworth County, Wisconsin. During the American Civil War, he enlisted with the Union Army. He achieved the rank of captain with the 28th Wisconsin Volunteer Infantry Regiment. Conflicts Smith participated in include the Battle of Helena and the Battle of Spanish Fort.

== Assembly career ==
Smith was a member of the Assembly in 1881. He was an Independent Republican.
