= William Greening =

American politician

William Greening was an English-born American member of the Wisconsin State Assembly.

== Biography ==
Greening was born in December 1827 in what was then Devonshire, England. He settled in La Grange, Walworth County, Wisconsin in 1855.

== Career ==
Greening was a member of the Assembly during the 1877 session. Other positions he held include Chairman (similar to Mayor), Supervisor and Assessor of La Grange. He was a Republican.
