= List of city managers of San Jose, California =

This is a list of city managers of San Jose, California from the establishment of the office by charter amendment in 1916.

1. Thomas H. Reed July 1916–October 1918
2. W. C. Bailey August 1918–October 1920
3. C. B. Goodwin October 1920–May 1944
4. John J. Lynch May 1944–1946
5. O. W. Campbell June 1946–December 1949
6. Anthony P. "Dutch" Hamann March 1950–November 1969
7. Thomas W. Fletcher December 1969–April 1973
8. Ted Tedesco February 1973–August 1978
9. James A. Alloway February 1979–May 1980
10. Francis T. Fox June 1980–July 1983
11. Gerald E. Newfarmer July 1983–May 1989
12. Leslie R. White May 1989–August 1994
13. Regina V. K. Williams November 1994–January 1999
14. Del D. Borgsdorf September 1999–February 2006
15. Leslie R. White February 2006–June 2007
16. Debra Figone July 2007–December 2013
17. Ed Shikada December 2013–January 2014
18. Norberto Duenas January 2014–October 2017
19. David Sykes October 2017–July 2021
20. Jennifer Maguire July 2021–present

== See also ==
- List of mayors of San Jose, California
