= Whitewater, Wisconsin =

City in Walworth and Jefferson Counties, Wisconsin

- City
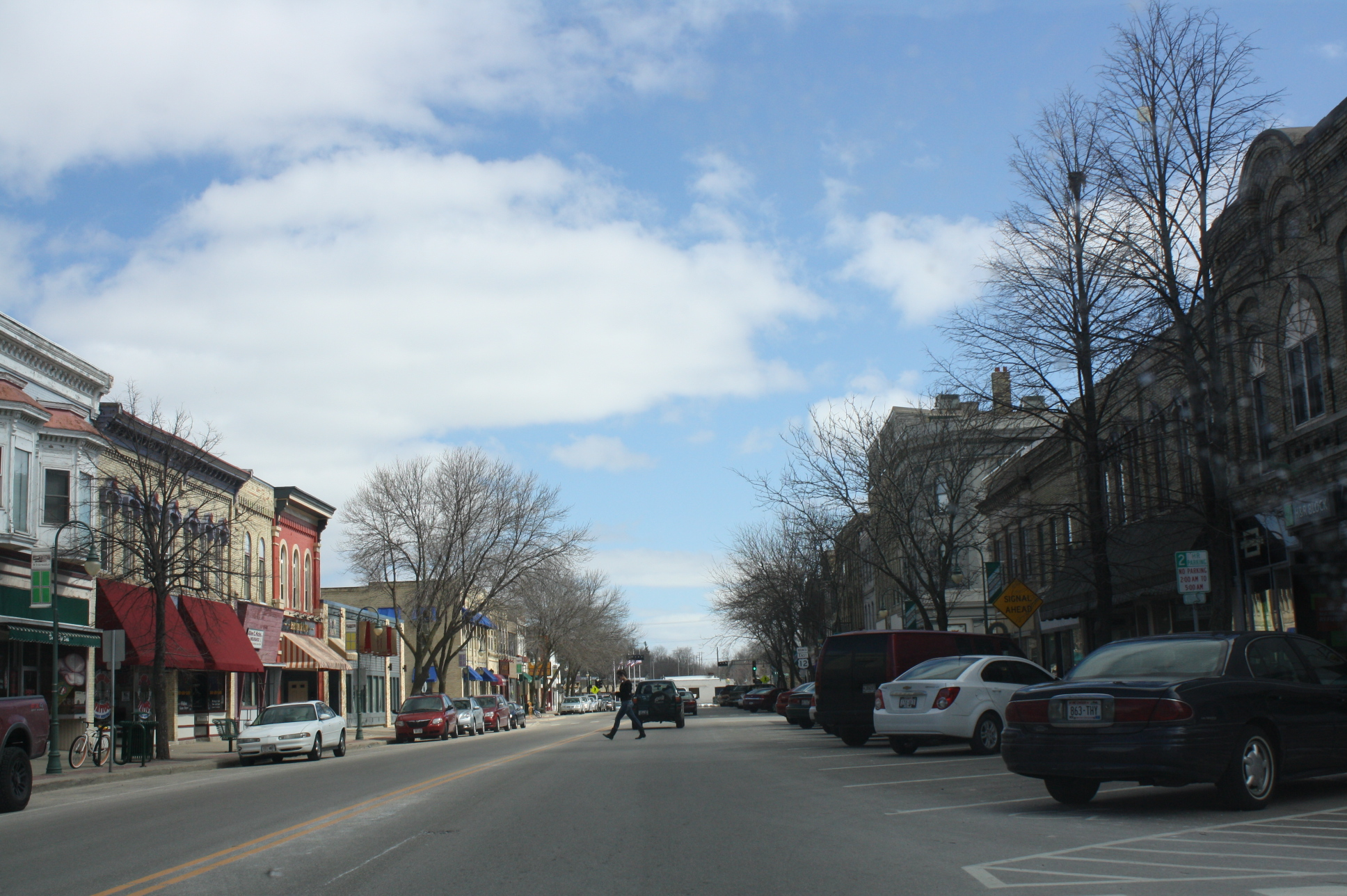
- Main Street, downtown Whitewater

- Location of Whitewater in Walworth and Jefferson counties, Wisconsin

- Location within Wisconsin Location within the United States
- Coordinates: 42°50′6″N 88°44′10″W
- Country: United States
- State: Wisconsin
- Counties: Walworth, Jefferson

Government
  - Type: Common Council

Area
  - Total: 9.14 sq mi (23.67 km^{2})
  - Land: 8.84 sq mi (22.89 km^{2})
  - Water: 0.30 sq mi (0.77 km^{2})
- Elevation: 824 ft (251 m)

Population (2020)
  - Total: 14,889
  - Density: 1,685.0/sq mi (650.58/km^{2})
- Time zone: UTC-6 (Central (CST))
  - Summer (DST): UTC-5 (CDT)
- Zip Code: 53190
- Area code: 262
- FIPS code: 55-86925
- GNIS feature ID: 1576690
- Website: www.whitewater-wi.gov

Whitewater is a city in Walworth and Jefferson counties in the U.S. state of Wisconsin. The population was 14,889 at the 2020 census. Whitewater is located near the southern portion of the Kettle Moraine State Forest and is home to the University of Wisconsin–Whitewater.

== History ==
Whitewater was founded at the confluence of Whitewater Creek and Spring Brook, and named for the white sand in their beds. A gristmill was built on Whitewater creek, the resulting pond now called Cravath Lake. The town grew quickly when the first railroad line in Wisconsin passed through in 1853, but struggled when the two largest employers left town.

Whitewater was originally founded entirely by settlers who arrived there from New England. These people were "Yankees", that is to say they were descended from the English Puritans who settled New England in the 1600s. They were part of a wave of New England farmers who headed west into what was then the wilds of the Northwest Territory during the early 1800s. Most of them arrived as a result of the completion of the Erie Canal. When they arrived in what is now Whitewater, then nothing but dense virgin forest and wild prairie, the New Englanders laid out farms, constructed roads, erected government buildings and established post routes. They brought with them many of their Yankee New England values, such as staunch support for abolitionism and a passion for education, establishing many schools as well. They were mostly members of the Congregationalist Church though some were Episcopalian. Due to the second Great Awakening some of them had converted to Methodism before moving to what is now Whitewater. Whitewater, like much of Wisconsin, would be culturally very continuous with early New England culture for most of its early history.

Unlike much of Wisconsin, Walworth County was notable for not being heavily German-American, Whitewater had almost no German-Americans at a time when the state as a whole was receiving many. Whitewater in particular and Walworth County in general were also heavily anti-slavery, and the abolitionist movement was popular amongst the New England descended portion of the population in the area.

In the late 1800s immigrant families primarily from Belgium, Canada, Russia and Serbia settled in Whitewater, as well as smaller amounts of immigrants from France and England.

== Geography ==
Train passing through Whitewater

According to the United States Census Bureau, the city has a total area of 9.06 square miles (23.47 km^{2}), of which 8.76 square miles (22.69 km^{2}) is land and 0.30 square miles (0.78 km^{2}) is water. Most of the city lies in Walworth County.

=== Climate ===
Climate data for Whitewater Wastewater Treatment Plant, Wisconsin (1991–2020 normals, extremes 1949–present)
Month	Jan	Feb	Mar	Apr	May	Jun	Jul	Aug	Sep	Oct	Nov	Dec	Year
Record high °F (°C)	60 (16)	71 (22)	83 (28)	90 (32)	95 (35)	100 (38)	102 (39)	101 (38)	100 (38)	89 (32)	78 (26)	66 (19)	102 (39)
Mean maximum °F (°C)	48.3 (9.1)	51.5 (10.8)	67.1 (19.5)	78.3 (25.7)	85.9 (29.9)	90.8 (32.7)	91.4 (33.0)	90.3 (32.4)	88.1 (31.2)	80.8 (27.1)	66.2 (19.0)	51.9 (11.1)	93.7 (34.3)
Mean daily maximum °F (°C)	27.4 (−2.6)	31.3 (−0.4)	43.4 (6.3)	56.5 (13.6)	68.6 (20.3)	78.4 (25.8)	81.9 (27.7)	80.2 (26.8)	73.6 (23.1)	60.6 (15.9)	45.6 (7.6)	33.0 (0.6)	56.7 (13.7)
Daily mean °F (°C)	19.5 (−6.9)	23.0 (−5.0)	34.1 (1.2)	45.9 (7.7)	57.6 (14.2)	67.7 (19.8)	71.4 (21.9)	69.4 (20.8)	62.0 (16.7)	50.1 (10.1)	37.2 (2.9)	25.6 (−3.6)	47.0 (8.3)
Mean daily minimum °F (°C)	11.5 (−11.4)	14.7 (−9.6)	24.9 (−3.9)	35.4 (1.9)	46.7 (8.2)	57.0 (13.9)	60.9 (16.1)	58.6 (14.8)	50.5 (10.3)	39.5 (4.2)	28.7 (−1.8)	18.2 (−7.7)	37.2 (2.9)
Mean minimum °F (°C)	−10.7 (−23.7)	−5.9 (−21.1)	4.3 (−15.4)	21.2 (−6.0)	31.3 (−0.4)	41.3 (5.2)	47.7 (8.7)	46.2 (7.9)	35.5 (1.9)	25.1 (−3.8)	12.2 (−11.0)	−2.8 (−19.3)	−14.6 (−25.9)
Record low °F (°C)	−37 (−38)	−27 (−33)	−20 (−29)	0 (−18)	17 (−8)	26 (−3)	40 (4)	31 (−1)	26 (−3)	13 (−11)	−10 (−23)	−25 (−32)	−37 (−38)
Average precipitation inches (mm)	1.58 (40)	1.53 (39)	1.88 (48)	3.52 (89)	4.19 (106)	4.96 (126)	3.76 (96)	4.31 (109)	3.52 (89)	3.01 (76)	2.22 (56)	1.75 (44)	36.23 (920)
Average snowfall inches (cm)	8.5 (22)	9.9 (25)	4.4 (11)	0.7 (1.8)	0.1 (0.25)	0.0 (0.0)	0.0 (0.0)	0.0 (0.0)	0.0 (0.0)	0.1 (0.25)	1.2 (3.0)	9.0 (23)	33.9 (86)
Average precipitation days (≥ 0.01 in)	9.5	8.5	9.4	12.3	13.6	12.4	10.4	10.8	10.5	12.0	9.4	9.6	128.4
Average snowy days (≥ 0.1 in)	5.1	4.1	2.2	0.5	0.0	0.0	0.0	0.0	0.0	0.1	0.9	4.1	17.0
Source: NOAA

== Demographics ==
In recent years, Whitewater has seen the arrival of around 800–1000 immigrants, mostly from Nicaragua. In a 2024 letter to the Biden administration, the city's police chief and city manager requested more federal resources to assist in handling the influx. Former President Trump and conservative media outlets highlighted the situation in Whitewater as an example of a city negatively impacted by lax immigration laws.

=== 2020 census ===
As of the 2020 census, Whitewater had a population of 14,889. There were 4,848 households and 1,806 families living in the city. The median age was 22.0 years. 12.8% of residents were under the age of 18, 57.3% were between the ages of 18 and 24, 71.5% were 15 to 44 years old, and 10.8% were 65 years of age or older. For every 100 females there were 105.8 males, and for every 100 females age 18 and over there were 105.0 males age 18 and over.

96.8% of residents lived in urban areas, while 3.2% lived in rural areas.

Of the city's 4,848 households, 20.5% had children under the age of 18 living in them and 25.5% had one or more people 60 years or older living in them. 28.1% were married-couple households, 30.5% were households with a male householder and no spouse or partner present, and 33.8% were households with a female householder and no spouse or partner present. About 38.1% of all households were made up of individuals, and 11.2% had someone living alone who was 65 years of age or older. The average household size was 2.32 and the average family size was 3.01.

There were 5,445 housing units, of which 11.0% were vacant. The homeowner vacancy rate was 5.0% and the rental vacancy rate was 9.7%.

Racial composition as of the 2020 census
Race	Number	Percent
White	11,741	78.9%
Black or African American	638	4.3%
American Indian and Alaska Native	83	0.6%
Asian	385	2.6%
Native Hawaiian and Other Pacific Islander	6	0.0%
Some other race	1,078	7.2%
Two or more races	958	6.4%
Hispanic or Latino (of any race)	2,086	14.0%

Historical population
Census	Pop.	Note	%±
1860	2,731		—
1880	3,617		—
1890	4,359		20.5%
1900	3,405		−21.9%
1910	3,224		−5.3%
1920	3,215		−0.3%
1930	3,465		7.8%
1940	3,689		6.5%
1950	5,101		38.3%
1960	6,380		25.1%
1970	12,038		88.7%
1980	11,520		−4.3%
1990	12,636		9.7%
2000	13,437		6.3%
2010	14,390		7.1%
2020	14,889		3.5%
U.S. Decennial Census

=== 2010 census ===
As of the census of 2010, there were 14,390 people, 4,766 households, and 1,781 families living in the city. The population density was 1,642.7 inhabitants per square mile (634.3/km^{2}). There were 5,113 housing units at an average density of 583.7 per square mile (225.4/km^{2}). The racial makeup of the city was 88.0% White, 3.5% African American, 0.3% Native American, 1.9% Asian, 0.1% Pacific Islander, 4.5% from other races, and 1.8% from two or more races. Hispanic or Latino people of any race were 9.5% of the population.

There were 4,766 households, of which 18.8% had children under the age of 18 living with them, 26.2% were married couples living together, 7.4% had a female householder with no husband present, 3.8% had a male householder with no wife present, and 62.6% were non-families. 34.6% of all households were made up of individuals, and 9.7% had someone living alone who was 65 years of age or older. The average household size was 2.28 and the average family size was 3.01.

The median age in the city was 21.9 years. 11.9% of residents were under the age of 18; 53.5% were between the ages of 18 and 24; 14.7% were from 25 to 44; 11.8% were from 45 to 64; and 8.4% were 65 years of age or older. The gender makeup of the city was 50.7% male and 49.3% female.

=== 2000 census ===
As of the census of 2000, there were 13,437 people, 4,132 households, and 1,685 families living in the city. The population density was 1,923.5 people per square mile (742.2/km^{2}). There were 4,340 housing units at an average density of 621.3 per square mile (239.7/km^{2}). The racial makeup of the city was 92.25% White, 2.34% African American, 0.27% Native American, 1.47% Asian, 0.01% Pacific Islander, 2.48% from other races, and 1.18% from two or more races. Hispanic or Latino people of any race were 6.50% of the population.

There were 4,132 households, out of which 19.3% had children under the age of 18 living with them, 30.5% were married couples living together, 7.1% had a female householder with no husband present, and 59.2% were non-families. 32.7% of all households were made up of individuals, and 10.7% had someone living alone who was 65 years of age or older. The average household size was 2.38 and the average family size was 3.00.

In the city, the population was spread out, with 12.5% under the age of 18, 53.2% from 18 to 24, 15.7% from 25 to 44, 9.8% from 45 to 64, and 8.9% who were 65 years of age or older. The median age was 22 years. For every 100 females, there were 95.6 males. For every 100 females age 18 and over, there were 94.1 males.

The median income for a household in the city was $31,600, and the median income for a family was $48,185. Males had a median income of $33,078 versus $22,431 for females. The per capita income for the city was $13,965. About 10.6% of families and 27.4% of the population were below the poverty line, including 17.3% of those under age 18 and 4.2% of those age 65 or over.

== Arts and culture ==
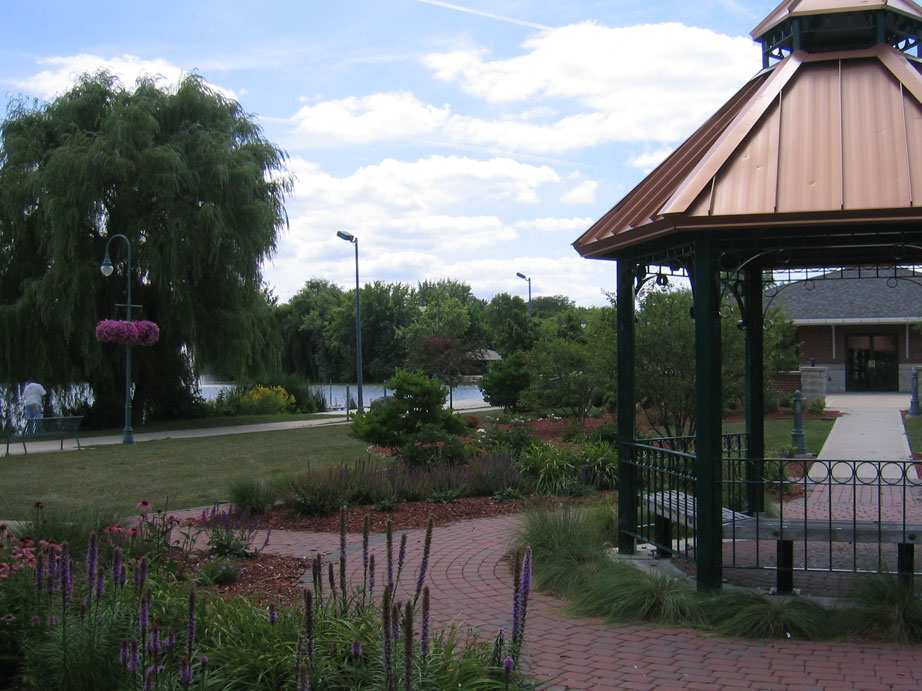
Cravath Lakefront Park

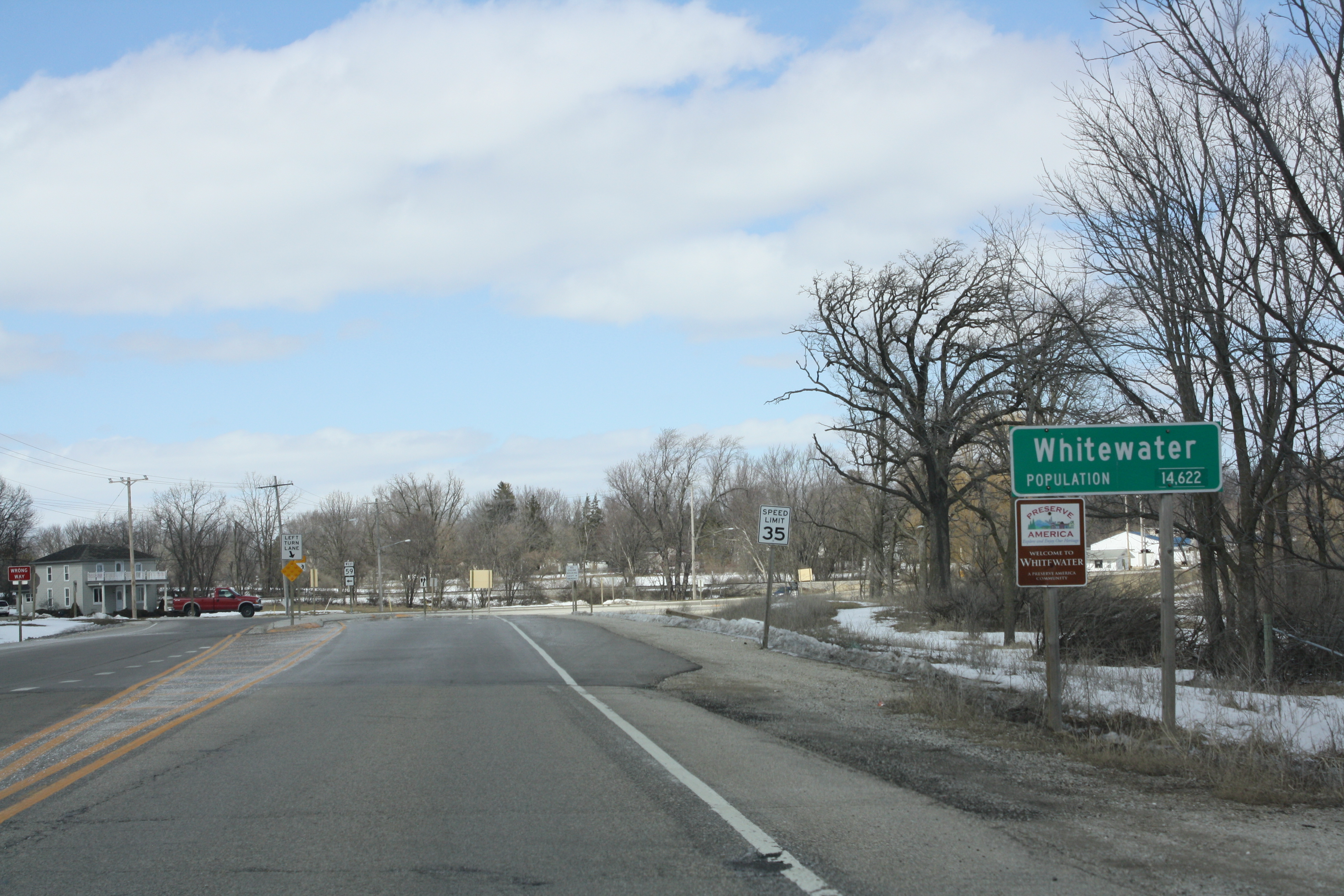
Welcome sign on WIS 59

Annual events in Whitewater include "Freeze Fest" in January, the Bridal Fair, Farm Toy Show in February, Maxwell Street Day and the 4th of July celebration in July. The Minneiska Water Ski Shows perform in the summer on Whitewater Lake. Departing from the Highway 12 crossing of the Ice Age Trail, group biking tours depart several times a week from the area. September through April, Young Auditorium at the university hosts entertainment.

== Parks and recreation ==
There are five community parks in Whitewater: Cravath Lakefront Park, Moraine View Park, Starin Park, Trippe Lake Park, and Whitewater Creek Nature Area. Effigy Mounds Preserve is an archeological park. An aquatic and fitness center is located in Whitewater.

== Government ==
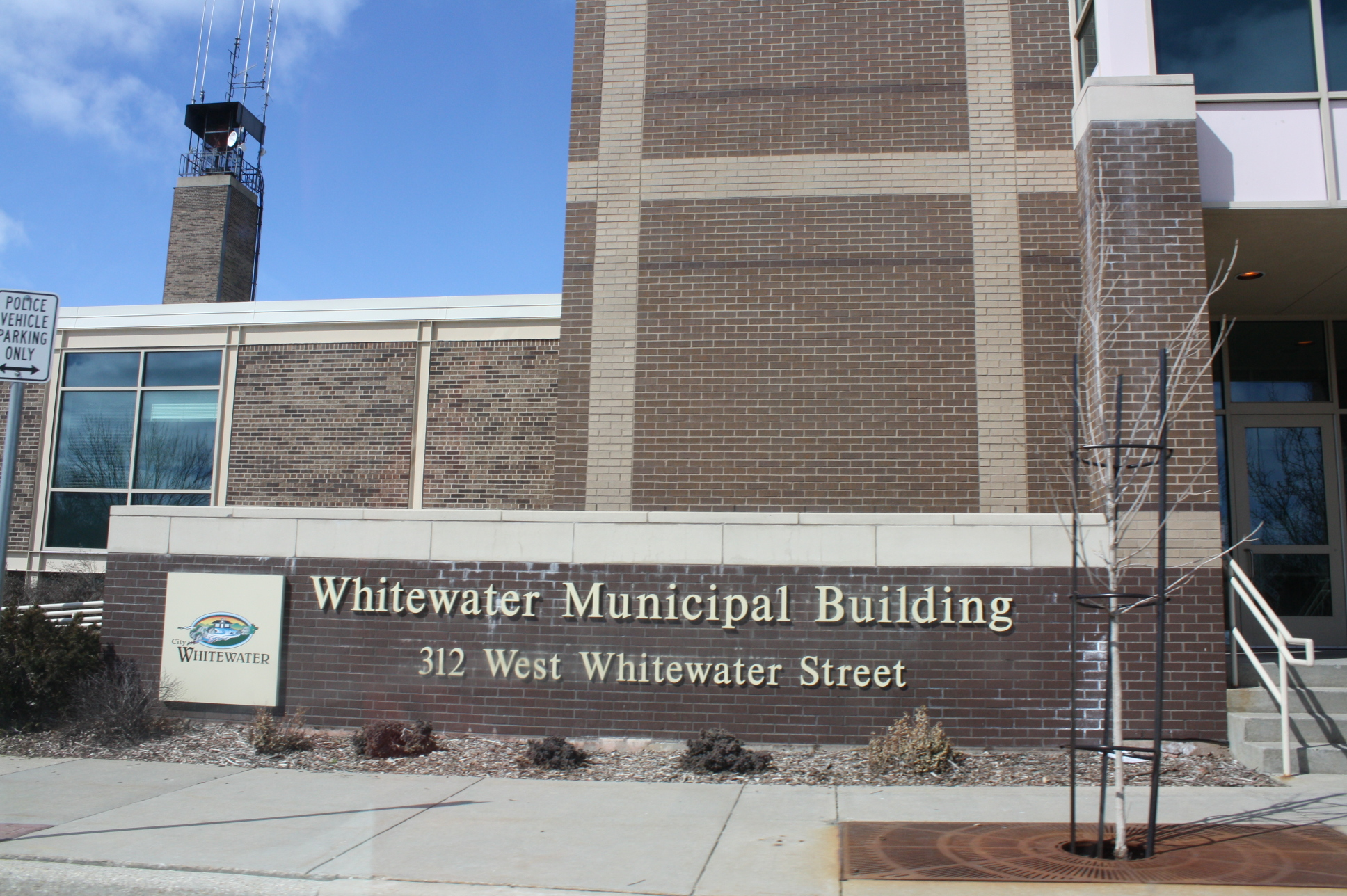
City hall

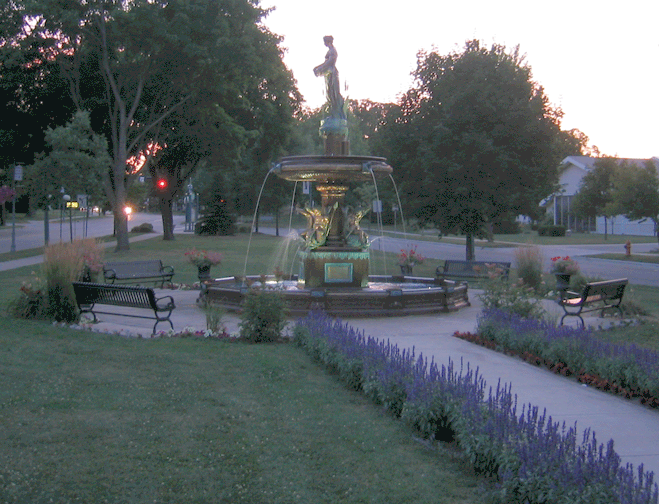
Birge Fountain, built in 1903, was renovated and rededicated in 2003.

Whitewater has a council-manager form of government. The city manager is John Weidl. The Whitewater Common Council is made up of one member from each of the five districts and two members-at-large.

== Education ==
Whitewater is served by the Whitewater Unified School District (WWUSD), which has five schools and one university in the city:

- Lakeview Elementary School
- Lincoln Elementary School
- Washington Elementary School
- Whitewater Middle School (WMS)
- Whitewater High School (WHS)
- University of Wisconsin–Whitewater

Kettle Moraine Baptist Academy, which serves students in grades kindergarten through 12, is also located in the city.

== Spiritualism and the supernatural ==
In 1840, a man by the name of Morris Pratt moved to Whitewater from New York as part of the greater "Yankee" migration to the area. He began to practice spiritualism in the decades that followed. After acquiring wealth in a business venture in northern Wisconsin, he opened his Temple of Science in 1889 on Whitewater's corner of Center and Third Streets. The Temple of Science primarily served as a place for Spiritualists to gather and was often the target of the city's criticism, having been given the nicknames "Pratt's Folly" and the "Spooks Temple" by the city's residents.

After Pratt's death in 1902, the Temple of Science was left in the care of the Morris Pratt Institute Association, who changed the building's name to The Morris Pratt Institute and turned the temple into the first formal school for spiritualists. The school offered courses in traditional academic areas (such as history, literature, math, and psychology) and Spiritualist studies, and was open to public enrollment. The Morris Pratt Institute held a steady number of students until the Great Depression, during which it closed for a few years, reopened, and then closed for good in 1940. The school then relocated to the Milwaukee suburb of Wauwatosa, Wisconsin, where it continues to operate today as part of the National Spiritualist Association of Churches.

The building that housed the Morris Pratt Institute was later bought by the State Teacher's College in Whitewater (now known as the University of Wisconsin–Whitewater) for use as a girls dormitory until a new dormitory was built on the college's campus in 1950. During this time, stories began to spread about supernatural events happening within the building.

The Morris Pratt Institute building was later torn down in 1961, and the supernatural stories connected to it were transferred to other locations across Whitewater. These stories include strange happenings at the Starin Park Water Tower (colloquially known as the "Whitchtower"), stories about Wisconsin's Beast of Bray Road, and various ghost stories from all across the city. The city now embraces these stories by adopting the nickname "Second Salem" (after Salem, Massachusetts) and holding Spirit Tours every October.

== Notable people ==
- Stephen Ambrose, author, historian
- George Awsumb, architect
- James C. Bartholf, Wisconsin politician and newspaper editor
- Zadoc P. Beach, Wisconsin politician
- Marvin H. Bovee, Wisconsin politician
- Edwin Coe, newspaper editor and politician
- Charles Coleman, Wisconsin politician
- Edward S. Curtis, photographer, director, actor, cinematographer
- Frank A. Dudley, New York state legislator and lawyer
- Jeffrey Foucault, recording artist
- Eva Kinney Griffith, journalist, temperance activist
- Ben Heller, Major League baseball player
- George W. Hull, Wisconsin politician
- Jeff Jagodzinski, NFL assistant coach, former head coach of the Boston College Eagles
- Dale Markham, NFL player
- Benjamin McCready, painter
- Stephen Nass, Wisconsin politician
- Eddie O'Donnell, Indy car driver
- Leon Pescheret, fine artist, designer, printmaker
- Elaine Roe, U.S. Army officer, one of the first four women to be awarded the Silver Star
- Edward J. Roethe, Wisconsin legislator
- Henry Edgar Roethe, Wisconsin legislator
- Byron Storm, Wisconsin legislator
- Eric Studesville, NFL assistant coach
- Eleazer Wakeley, Justice of the Nebraska Territory Supreme Court
- Jerome Anthony Watrous (1840–1922), author, newspaper writer, Republican politician, and lt. colonel
- Thompson Weeks, Wisconsin politician
- Samuel A. White, Wisconsin politician
