= List of proposed national parks of the United States =

National parks in the United States are created by United States Congress legislation as per the National Park Service Organic Act. However, most parks are first proposed by members of the public, states, local entities, tribal nations, members of Congress, or even the National Park Service itself.

== Criteria for national parks ==
For an area to become a unit of the National Park System, it must possess nationally significant natural, cultural, or recreational resources; be a suitable (Note: According to the National Park Service, suitability means that "[the] area must represent a natural or cultural theme or type of recreational resource that is not already adequately represented in the National Park System or is not comparably represented and protected for public enjoyment by another land-managing entity.") and feasible (Note: According to the National Park Service, feasibility means that "[the] area's natural systems and/or historic settings must be of sufficient size and appropriate configuration to ensure long-term protection of the resources and to accommodate public use. It must have potential for efficient administration at a reasonable cost." Important feasibility factors include "landownership, acquisition costs, life cycle maintenance costs, access, threats to the resource, and staff or development requirements.") addition to the system; and require direct management by the National Park Service (NPS) (rather than protection by the private sector or other governmental agencies).

A proposed area is considered nationally significant if it meets all four of the following standards:

1. It is an outstanding example of a particular type of resource.
2. It possesses exceptional value or quality in illustrating or interpreting the natural or cultural themes of the heritage of the United States.
3. It offers superlative opportunities for recreation for public use and enjoyment, or for scientific study.
4. It retains a high degree of integrity as a true, accurate, and relatively unspoiled example of the resource.

Members of the United States Congress can authorize the NPS to conduct a special resource study to gather information surrounding potential inclusions into the National Park System. Each special resource study will examine each of the above four criteria individually. However, units of the System are ultimately created by legislation. Proposed parks which have seen legislation put forth in Congress are shaded in green below. Other proposals, including those by the public in the form of documents or editorials in local media, are also included below.

== Proposed U.S. national parks ==
Proposed Name & Area	Photo	Location	Year	Notes	External information
Adirondack Mountain National Park		New York	1967	In 1967 Laurance Rockefeller proposed that a 1,720,000-acre (700,000 ha) National Park be established in the center of the Adirondack Park.	A Report On A Proposed Adirondack Mountain National Park; What Would an Adirondack National Park Look Like?, Adirondack Almanac
Admiralty Island National Park		Alaska	1928, 1947–1977	First proposed in 1928 as a national park protecting the island's brown bears. National Park Service officials inspected Admiralty Island in 1932, 1938 and 1942. The question was raised again in 1947, 1948, 1950, 1955 and 1962. The area was proclaimed Admiralty Island National Monument in 1978 under Forest Service management.	"Do Things Right the First Time", NPS administrative history
Alaskan Volcanoes National Park		Alaska	1948, 1949	Assistant Secretary of the Interior William E. Warne suggested on December 6, 1948 that Mount Shishaldin or another volcano in the Aleutian Islands might merit national park status. Director Newton Drury replied that Shishaldin was inaccessible and seldom visible because of fog and storms, and that Congress had not adequately provided for the large areas already set aside in Alaska. Frank Been, former superintendent of Mount McKinley, hesitated to single out one volcano without further study. In 1949, the director wrote Assistant Secretary Warne that if funds are made available this Service would make a field study of this and other volcanos	Suggested Areas Resumes, NPS 1957
Allegheny Forest and National Park		Pennsylvania, New York	2018	The Allegheny National Park Campaign proposed to raise 77,500 acres of the 517,000 current acres of the National Forest to National Park status. The raised areas include Kinzua (the Pennsylvania Shore of the Allegheny Reservoir), Hickory Creek and Hearts Content, the Allegheny River (river unit of the Allegheny National Recreation Area), Tionesta, Minister Valley, and parts of the Clarion River. The proposal is yet to be read in Congress, as the campaign is waiting to receive enough signatures backing for the designation.	Allegheny National Park Proposal
Ancient Forest National Park		California, Oregon	2009	Inclusion of wilderness and roadless areas of various national forests along coastal California-Oregon border, including Six Rivers National Forest, Klamath National Forest, Rogue River–Siskiyou National Forest, and Trinity National Forest, as a cohesive national park unit.	Nativetreesociety.org; Take A Closer Look At Proposed Ancient Forest National Park, National Parks Traveler
Apalachicola National Park		Florida	1934, 1935, 1940	Covering land between Blountstown and the Georgia state line. Representative Millard Caldwell forwarded a letter in July 1934 from T. D. Branch of Sumatra, Florida suggesting that 50 square miles (130 km^{2}) be set aside to preserve unusual trees, rare plant growths and land formations. The Director wrote to Senator Duncan U. Fletcher in April 1935 that a Civilian Conservation Corps camp had been authorized in Torreya State Forest Park and that preservation of the Torreya tree was therefore adequately provided for; Apalachicola National Forest was established on May 13, 1936. Torreya State Park now covers the best part of the suggested area.	Suggested Areas Resumes, NPS 1957
Appalachian National Park		Virginia	1913, 1922, 1935	Interest in a park near Norton first appeared in 1913 through resolutions and petitions from civic groups. Representative C. Bascom Slemp introduced two bills in the 67th Congress in 1922 and Representative George C. Peery a third in the 68th. Conservation organizations opposed the bill at the House Public Lands Committee hearing on the grounds that no adequate survey had determined which Appalachian areas were most suitable; the bill was reported favorably but Congress did not act. The controversy led Congress to authorize the survey that ultimately produced Great Smoky Mountains National Park and Shenandoah National Park; the resulting Southern Appalachian National Park Committee, appointed in 1924, also considered and rejected the Linville Gorge–Grandfather Mountain area in North Carolina. Senator Harry F. Byrd introduced a bill in 1935 for a park in the High Knob region, disapproved as inferior to the two parks already established; the area became part of Jefferson National Forest in 1936.	Suggested Areas Resumes, NPS 1957
Aniakchak National Park & Preserve		Alaska	1979	An earlier version of the Alaska National Interest Lands Conservation Act (S.222), introduced by Sen. John Durkin included making a Aniakchak National Park & Preserve. It was eventually made Aniakchak National Monument and Preserve.	S.222 - Alaska National Interest Lands Conservation Act of 1979
Apostle Islands National Park		Wisconsin	1930, 2024	On May 9, 1930, HR. 8763 was introduced, which would designate an Apostle Islands National Park. In 2024, legislation was introduced by U.S. Representative Tom Tiffany to rename the national lakeshore as a national park, with Sand Island as a national preserve.	Wisconsin's Apostle Islands could become America's newest national park, Milwaukee Journal Sentinel
Arctic Wilderness National Park		Alaska	1952	Arising from the Alaska Recreational Resources Survey, whose investigators focused on the wilderness north of the Brooks Range in the Mount Michelson, Kongakut and Firth River areas. The Sierra Club wrote to Secretary Oscar L. Chapman on September 12, 1952 urging an active study, and other conservation groups followed. The area became the Arctic National Wildlife Range in 1960.	Suggested Areas Resumes, NPS 1957 "Do Things Right the First Time", NPS administrative history
Atchafalaya National Park		Louisiana	2014	Local Sierra Club chapter proposal for inclusion of Atchafalaya National Wildlife Refuge, the Sherburne Complex Wildlife Management Area, and the greater basin as a national park.	Group: Create big Atchafalaya national park Sierra Club pushes for national park status
Bandelier National Park & Preserve		New Mexico	2019	Proposal by U.S. Senator Martin Heinrich to redesignate Bandelier National Monument as a National Park & Preserve.	Heinrich Announces Plan to Establish Bandelier National Park and Preserve
Bering Land Bridge National Park		Alaska	1979	An earlier version of the Alaska National Interest Lands Conservation Act (S.222), introduced by Sen. John Durkin included making a Bering Land Bridge National Park. It was eventually made Bering Land Bridge National Preserve.	S.222 - Alaska National Interest Lands Conservation Act of 1979
Bentsen–Rio Valley National Park		Texas	1949	Representative Lloyd Bentsen, whose family had donated the land for the state park of the same name, wrote to the Director on March 16, 1949 after discussing possible national park status with Conrad Wirth. The Director expressed doubt that the area would meet the standards by which sites are judged for inclusion in the National Park System, but promised a field investigation. The area remains Bentsen-Rio Grande Valley State Park.	Suggested Areas Resumes, NPS 1957
Breaks of the Sandy National Park		Virginia, Kentucky	1935–1939	Wilbur C. Hall, chairman of Virginia's State Committee on Conservation and Development, wrote on March 6, 1935 asking how to apply for federal aid to establish the area as a national park under state maintenance and administration, and was told the proposal should be submitted by the commission. The area was investigated in the summer of 1937. Legislation to establish a Breaks of Sandy National Park was before Congress in 1939. Subsequent action by Kentucky and Virginia led Congress to consent to an interstate compact between the two states, and the Breaks Interstate Park Commission was established to acquire the land.	Legislation, The Regional Review, NPS Region One, February 1939; Suggested Areas Resumes, NPS 1957
Big Horn Canyon National Park		Wyoming, Montana	1923, 1934	First investigated in 1923 by the National Parks Committee of the National Parks Association; despite a favorable recommendation the Service did not approve it. Bighorn Canyon National Recreation Area was established in 1966.	Suggested Areas Resumes, NPS 1957
Big Thicket National Park		Texas	1973	On January 11, 1973, S.314 was introduced by Senator Lloyd Bentsen, which would designate a Big Thicket National Park. The East Big Thicket Association and a later successor organization lobbied for the creation of the national park for decades starting in 1936. The alternative National Preserve was ultimately passed.	HEARINGS BEFORE THE SUBCOMMITTEE ON PARKS AND RECREATION OF THE COMMITTEE ON INTERIOR AND INSULAR AFFAIRS. UNITED STATES SENATE
Big Sur Coast National Park		California	1977	A group of Monterey Peninsula residents led by Ansel Adams pressed for federal protection of the Big Sur coast, forming the Big Sur Foundation in 1978; local residents organized in opposition and pursued a county-drafted Local Coastal Plan instead. Senator Alan Cranston introduced S. 2551 to establish a Big Sur Coast National Scenic Area under the Department of Agriculture rather than the Park Service. The National Park Service recorded the proposal as not feasible owing to strong local opposition to NPS control.	S.2551 - A bill to establish the Big Sur Coast National Scenic Area
Big South Fork National Park		Kentucky, Tennessee	1968, 1969	The 1960s the Senate five times approved a hydroelectric dam at Devils Jump while the House five times rejected it. Local community and conservation leaders, among them Tennessee Citizens for Wilderness Planning, formed the Big South Fork Coalition to press for permanent protection of the gorge. Senators John Sherman Cooper, Howard Baker, Thruston Morton and Albert Gore Sr. directed the Corps in 1968, under section 218 of the Flood Control Act of 1968, to restudy the dam and to examine alternatives jointly with the Departments of the Interior and Agriculture. The resulting interagency report, printed for the Senate Committee on Public Works on December 1, 1969, set out six alternatives ranging from proceeding with Devils Jump Dam to converting the gorge into a national forest, a national park, or a national recreation area. Congress adopted the recreation area concept, and the Big South Fork National River and Recreation Area was authorized in 1974 and transferred from the Corps to the National Park Service in 1991.	Big South Fork, Cumberland River, Kentucky and Tennessee: Interagency Report, Senate Committee on Public Works, 1969; National River and Recreation Area, Nashville District history, U.S. Army Corps of Engineers
Black Hills National Park		South Dakota	1939	An investigation of a section of the southern Black Hills for national park purposes was made in October 1939 by Regional Landscape Architect Baker, Regional Forester Frank Childs and Regional Geologist Carroll Wegemann of the Region Two NPS office. Their report, submitted to the Regional Director on February 1, 1940, reached a preliminary conclusion with Chief of Planning Ben Thompson that the area was well qualified from the scenic and conservation standpoint to warrant a favorable recommendation.	Suggested Areas Resumes, NPS 1957
Buffalo Commons National Park		Kansas	1987, 2009	In November 2009 the editorial board of The Kansas City Star called for a prairie-based national park in Kansas where bison could roam as they had 150 years earlier, reviving the Buffalo Commons concept advanced by Frank and Deborah Popper in their 1987 Planning article "The Great Plains: From Dust to Dust", which proposed federal acquisition of some 139,000 square miles (360,000 km^{2}) across ten Plains states.	Newspaper Turns Back the Calendar and Calls for "Buffalo Commons National Park" in Kansas, National Parks Traveler
Buffalo River National Park & Preserve		Arkansas	2023	Runway group proposal for redesignation of the Buffalo National River as a National Park & Preserve.	A National Park would preserve the Buffalo River way of life. - Coalition for the Future of the Buffalo River National Park & Preserve; Arkansas group floats idea of Buffalo National River into national park preserve - Arkansas Advocate
Cabinet National Park		Montana, Idaho	1916, 1933	Covering 62,380 acres (25,240 ha) within the Cabinet Mountains and Kootenai National Forest in Lincoln County. Identical bills were introduced in 1916 by Senator Henry L. Myers and a Representative Evans. The core became the Cabinet Mountains Wilderness, one of the original units of the National Wilderness Preservation System, in 1964.	Suggested Areas Resumes, NPS 1957
Calaveras Groves National Park		California	1907, 1908, 1941, 1954	Bills were introduced in Congress in 1907 and 1908 to bring the Calaveras giant sequoia groves into the park system, followed by a later campaign involving private donations to purchase the holdings. The Director found acquisition not feasible.	Dilsaver, "Not of National Significance", California History 85:2 (2008)
Cape Krusenstern National Park		Alaska	1979	An earlier version of the Alaska National Interest Lands Conservation Act (S.222), introduced by Sen. John Durkin included making a Cape Krusenstern National Park. It stayed as Cape Krusenstern National Monument.	S.222 - Alaska National Interest Lands Conservation Act of 1979
Cimarron Canyon National Park		New Mexico	1936, 1939, 1946	A canyon in Colfax County running from Eagle Nest to the town of Cimarron. John E. Kell's 1936 report on the Eagle's Nest watershed mentioned it as a possible park. It is now Cimarron Canyon State Park.	Suggested Areas Resumes, NPS 1957
Colorado Canyons National Park		Colorado	1906, 2012	John Otto lobbied for the creation of a national park, convincing locals in Grand Junction of the cause. Bills were introduced in Congress, but William Howard Taft ultimately declared Colorado National Monument. Several locals in Grand Junction, Colorado began promoting the idea of elevating the status of the monument to a national park in the early 2010s.	Disputing Whether a Treasure Needs a Name Upgrade, The New York Times, 2012; Talk of monument getting park designation, TheDailySentinel, 2017
Columbia Gorge National Park		Oregon, Washington	1934, 1935, 1939, 1941	Various suggestions proposed national park status for scenic portions of the Columbia River. A 1934 suggestion proposed a Columbia River Highway National Park; the National Resources Board report of 1935 suggested a Columbia Gorge National Park, and later studies found the area scenically and geologically significant but hampered by complicated land ownership. A draft proclamation of October 2, 1939 called for a 38,000-acre (15,000 ha) national monument on the Oregon side near Bonneville Dam, without result. Representative Homer D. Angell forwarded a Portland Women's Forum proposal in 1941 prompted by logging activity; Director Conrad Wirth replied that conflicting interests made park or monument status inappropriate and recommended state or interstate action. The Columbia River Gorge National Scenic Area was created in 1986.	Suggested Areas Resumes, NPS 1957
Craters of the Moon National Park and Preserve		Idaho	2015	Butte County commissioner Rose Bernal and a group of other locals campaigned for National Park designation of Craters of the Moon National Monument and Preserve. The Idaho State Senate passed a referendum in support of the idea in 2015.	Should this national monument become a national park? - HighCountryNews
Crazy Mountains National Park		Montana	1916, 1935	Sometimes called Absaroka National Park in early proposals. The 1916 proposal came from Henry Gerharz, the state's Surveyor General, who was impressed by the Crazy Mountains concentrated alpine scenery, geology and waterfalls and argued that because it stands alone, without other high peaks nearby, it would be a distinct addition despite Montana already having two parks. Congress did not pass the legislation.	Dilsaver & Wyckoff, "Failed National Parks in the Last Best Place", Montana 59:3 (2009)
Davis Mountains National Park		Texas	1921,1934	From about 1921 civic officials, bankers, merchants, ranchers, chambers of commerce, state and federal legislators and others petitioned for a large park in the Davis Mountains of Jeff Davis County, sometimes called the Texas Alps and inaccessible by automobile until the 1930s. Bills were introduced in Congress as H.R. 9193 in the 68th, H.R. 3864 in the 69th and H.R. 3590 in the 71st, and in 1931 the Texas legislature considered a measure providing $300,000 to acquire park land in the Guadalupe Mountains that proposed a Davis Mountain national park in the same bill; it died for lack of support.	Texas' national park that never was, The Big Bend Sentinel; History of Legislation Relating to the National Park System Through the 82d Congress, NPS 1958
Delaware River National Park & Lenape Preserve		New Jersey, Pennsylvania	2021	Retired Delaware Water Gap National Recreation Area superintendent John Donahue put forward a proposal for redesignating the park. Supported by local Sierra Club chapters.	Delaware River National Park & Lenape Preserve Alliance; Alliance Proposal; Delaware Water Gap could become the first national park in Pennsylvania, New Jersey - USAToday, 2021
Devil's Nest National Park		Nebraska	1935	The Nebraska House passed a resolution in 1935 asking the federal government to preserve a rugged tract in Knox County known as Devil's Nest as a national park, forwarded by Representative Karl Stefan; Senator Peter Norbeck reported that the South Dakota legislature had adopted a supporting resolution. A Park Service inspection that March found the area of considerable recreational. The Devil's Nest National Park and Game Preserve Association of Crofton pressed the case until 1938, when the Service offered a Civilian Conservation Corps camp to help develop it as a state park if Nebraska acquired the land. The area overlooks Lewis and Clark Lake on the Missouri River and is now largely private, adjoining the Santee Indian Reservation.	Suggested Areas Resumes, NPS 1957
Dinosaur National Park		Colorado, Utah	1992, 2015	In the late 1980s and early 1990s, Robert Starr Waite, who successfully campaigned for the creation of Great Basin National Park, put together a similar proposal for designating Dinosaur National Monument a National Park. In 2015, Congressman Jason Chaffetz and Rob Bishop put forward a plan to designate the monument a National Park.	PARK STATUS AGAIN SOUGHT FOR DINOSAUR MONUMENT - Deseret News, 1992
Dismal Swamp National Park		Virginia, North Carolina	1934, 1945	Roger W. Toll inspected the Great Dismal Swamp in November 1934 for a potential national park. The Suffolk Chamber of Commerce urged park or monument status in 1941 and Senator Harry F. Byrd forwarded the resolution, receiving an account of the lack of purchase funds. Great Dismal Swamp National Wildlife Refuge was established in 1974.	Suggested Areas Resumes, NPS 1957
Driftless / Driftless Rivers / Upper Mississippi Valley National Parks		Iowa, Illinois, Minnesota, Wisconsin	1909, 1930, 2006, 2023	The Driftless area has been the focus of several proposals for a national park. In 1909, State Representative George Schulte proposed a national park at the confluence of the Wisconsin River and Mississippi River near McGregor, Iowa to the Iowa general assembly. Later versions of this proposal stretched from St. Paul, Minnesota to Dubuque, Iowa through what is now the Upper Mississippi River National Wildlife and Fish Refuge. In 1915, US Senator William Kenyon introduced a bill (S. 4585) to establish a Mississippi Valley National Park. In 1931, after studying the potential park, Roger W. Toll recommended preserving local Native American mounds as a small monument in what would become Effigy Mounds National Monument. In 2006, Bryan Stanley wrote a book "The Becoming of Driftless Rivers National Park" advocating for converting Crawford County, Wisconsin into a national park. In 2023, a Rochester meteorologist proposed converting the Whitewater Wildlife Management Area, State Park, and nearby public lands into a Driftless National Park & Preserve, potentially stretching down the Mississippi river to Perrot State Park.	The Movement to Create a National Park in Iowa driftlessrivers.org La Crosse Tribune; Driftless National Park & Preserve Initiative; With a proposal to turn the Driftless into a national park shelved, what happens next? - The Gazette
Escalante Canyons National Park and Preserve		Utah	1940, 2017	The National Park Service considered designating a national park unit in the 1930s and early 1940s. In 2017, US Representative Chris Stewart introduced legislation designating a national park out of the Escalante Canyons unit of Grand Staircase–Escalante National Monument, legislation which he re-introduced in 2020.	Rep. Stewart once again proposes new national park in Utah, FOX13Now, 2020
Fall Creek Falls National Park		Tennessee	1937	In 1937, regional director of the NPS Conrad Wirth visited the Fall Creek Falls National Recreation Demonstration Project and thought the area should be kept by the NPS as a National Park. He sent seven park planners to the area several months later, who were unimpressed by the waterfalls due to a drought. The park was turned over to the state of Tennessee as Fall Creek Falls State Park in 1944.	Almost a National Park: The Early Days of Fall Creek Falls State Park - The Tennessee Conservationist
Flathead National Park		Montana	1930	Proposed by J. L. Jones, president of the Ronan Commercial Club, in a letter to Director Horace M. Albright covering more than 1,000,000 acres (400,000 ha) east of Flathead Lake including the Mission, Swan and Lewis ranges. Jones envisioned highways up the canyons, horseback trails to the glaciers and cottage homes along the valley, calling the region a fitting substitute for the lost Garden of Eden. A two-week field reconnaissance in summer 1937 by forester Frank Childs, geologist Carroll Wegemann and wildlife technician Adolph Murie was among the most thorough investigations of any proposed park unit; the verdict in May 1938 was that the region was scenically beautiful but not as spectacular as Glacier National Park.	Dilsaver & Wyckoff, "Failed National Parks in the Last Best Place", Montana 59:3 (2009)
Florida Springs National Park		Florida	2025	In 2022, the Florida Springs Institute proposed a "Great Springs & Rivers National Park" to permanently protect multiple first-magnitude springs, their springsheds, and stretches of rivers. In August 2025, Representative Randy Fine introduced legislation to commission a special resource study, directing the Department of Interior to study a potential Florida Springs National Park in the area of Ocala National Forest, Paynes Prairie Preserve State Park, De Leon Springs State Park, and other already protected lands in north-central Florida.	Mark Woods: An idea for an addition to America's Best Idea — Florida Springs National Park, Jacksonville Florida Times-Union
Gila National Park		New Mexico	1937	Covering 654,000 acres (265,000 ha), largely the primitive area of Gila National Forest in Grant and Catron counties, and absorbing the 160-acre (65 ha) Gila Cliff Dwellings National Monument. A report of October 1937 by Region Three personnel including C. A. Richey and Charles Gould was favorable for a national park. A draft proclamation was rewritten to make administration subject to power site reserves and water power designations, cleared by the Geological Survey and sent to the General Land Office, but was subsequently withdrawn.	Suggested Areas Resumes, NPS 1957
Golden Isles National Park		Georgia, South Carolina	1946	Islands off the Georgia and South Carolina coast, described in Park Service files as important as the center of the "Old Rice Kingdom" of the early nineteenth century. One of several national park suggestions submitted by Robert L. Wood of Seattle in a letter of January 14, 1946; the Service replied that the suggestion would be listed for study when funds and personnel became available. The area is now protected by a complex of federal units including Cumberland Island National Seashore, established in 1972, and the seven refuges of the Savannah Coastal Refuges Complex, which total nearly 57,000 acres (23,000 ha) along a 100-mile stretch of coastline in both states.	Suggested Areas Resumes, NPS 1957
Grand Coulee National Park		Washington	1917–1933	One of the most persistently introduced national park proposals never enacted. Bills to establish a Grand Coulee National Park were before Congress in eight consecutive Congresses — S. 2671 in the 65th, S. 627 in the 66th, S. 2677 in the 67th, S. 1708 in the 68th, S. 88 and H.R. 4009 in the 69th, S. 1599 in the 70th, S. 2318 in the 71st and S. 1490 in the 72nd — almost all of them Senate bills. The Grand Coulee is an ancient channel of the Columbia River running some 60 miles and bisected by Dry Falls. No park was created; construction of Grand Coulee Dam from 1933 and the flooding of the upper coulee by Banks Lake for the Columbia Basin Project settled the question. The core of the lower coulee is now Sun Lakes-Dry Falls State Park, and the Grand Coulee is a National Natural Landmark.	History of Legislation Relating to the National Park System Through the 82d Congress, NPS 1958; Grand Coulee of Washington, 1942
Grandfather Mountain National Park		North Carolina	1899, 1917, 1924, 1933	Suggestions for a national park in western North Carolina arose in the 1880s. The Appalachian National Park Association was formed at Asheville in 1899 to promote a national park in the eastern United States; a multi-state effort drawing representatives from six southern states, it held a convention in 1902 attended by 1,500 people and lobbied Congress with limited success before disbanding in 1905, opposed by the lumber industry and unsupported by the federal government. The sundry civil act of June 12, 1917 authorized the Secretary of the Interior to accept lands in North Carolina including Grandfather Mountain, and the Park Service announced in its annual report for that year that the 1,400-acre (570 ha) tract would be donated by public-spirited citizens of the state and called a Grandfather Mountain National Park — what would have been the first national park east of the Mississippi. The report described the mountain as the highest in the Blue Ridge, the centre of more river systems than any other peak, and already served by road and trail improvements, and said a detailed description would be published as soon as the transfer of the property was completed. The transfer was never completed and no park was established. In 1924 Secretary of the Interior Hubert Work appointed the Southern Appalachian National Park Committee to study some thirty proposed sites for an eastern park, two of them in North Carolina: the Linville Gorge–Grandfather Mountain area and the Great Smoky Mountains. The North Carolina legislature created the North Carolina Park Commission the same year to secure a national park for the state, and the commission initially preferred Linville Gorge and Grandfather Mountain, switching to the Smokies only after the national committee recommended the Blue Ridge Mountains of Virginia and the Great Smokies as the best sites. In October 1933 the Third District of the North Carolina Federation of Women's Clubs petitioned Secretary Harold L. Ickes through Representative Robert L. Doughton to preserve the balsam and spruce forest on Grandfather Mountain, which they called the chief scenic asset of that part of the state. The area is now divided between Pisgah National Forest, the Linville Gorge Wilderness and Grandfather Mountain State Park.	Correspondence of proposed Grandfather Mountain National Park, npshistory.com Great Smoky Mountains National Park, NCpedia; The Appalachian National Park Movement, 1885–1901, North Carolina Historical Review, 1960
Great Rivers National Park		Illinois, Missouri	2023	Local group AltonWorks introduces proposal for a national park spanning much of the confluence of the Mississippi River and Missouri River near Alton, Illinois, including various public lands such as much of the Mark Twain National Wildlife Refuge Complex and Pere Marquette State Park.	Plan for proposed Great Rivers National Park debuts, TheTelegraph
Great Salt Lake National Park		Utah	2023	Paul Alan Cox proposed a national park to protect the Great Salt Lake, which is increasingly under threat from water scarcity.	Opinion: Making the Great Salt Lake into a national park, DesertNews, 2023
Green Mountain National Park		Vermont	1935, 1949	Act 17 of the Vermont legislature's 1935 special session, passed December 14, 1935, approved a national park known as the Green Mountain Parkway — a 260-mile scenic highway with hiking trails and a bridle path through a 50,000-acre (20,000 ha) national park along the ridge of the Green Mountains, modeled on the Blue Ridge Parkway. Voters were asked in a March 3, 1936 referendum to choose an effective date of April 1, 1936 or April 1, 1941; by choosing the later date they rejected the federal offer, and the legislature repealed the act on February 5, 1937. In September 1936 Guy W. Bailey, president of the University of Vermont, asked the President to declare the Winooski–Lamoille section a national monument; after an investigation the area was disapproved, but was supplanted by a Park Service proposal for a Green Mountain National Park. Legislation to establish a Green Mountain National Park was before Congress in the session beginning in 1939, but was not acted upon. Green Mountain National Forest covers much of the area.	1936: The Green Mountain Parkway, Vermont State Archives and Records Administration; When Vermont Almost Got A National Park, Vermont Public, 2016; Suggested Areas Resumes, NPS 1957
Guana River National Park		Florida	1973	On January 3, 1973, H.R.383 was introduced by Representative Bill Chappell, which would designate a Guana River National Park. Part of the area is currently protected by the Guana Tolomato Matanzas National Estuarine Research Reserve.	H.R.383 - To provide for the establishment of the Guana River National Park in the State of Florida, and for other purpose.
Hells Canyon National Park		Idaho, Oregon	1940, 1990	Amid talks of the Forest Service joining the Department of the Interior in 1940, there was a growing push for a Hells Canyon National Park. In 1990, a group of locals pushed for a Hells Canyon National Park & Preserve.	Hells Canyon: Should it be a park? - High Country News, 1990; 3 national parks in Oregon that never happened - OregonLive, 2016
High Allegheny National Park and Preserve		West Virginia	2011	In October 2011, the NPS announced a Reconnaissance Survey of a National Park composed of portions of Monongahela National Forest at the request of US Senator Joe Manchin. Manchin withdrew his request in 2012.	Are You Ready for High Allegheny National Park? - Woodshed, 2011
Hooker Hammock National Park		Florida	1930	In the face of plans to convert the area to farmland, Mayor C. S. Donaldson and locals proposed a national park out of what is now Highlands Hammock State Park.	Correspondence of proposed Hooker Hammock National Park, npshistory.com
Ice Peaks National Park		Washington	1937,1940	Mount Rainier National Park superintendent Owen A. Tomlinson's proposed "Five Ice Peaks National Park", and the Park Service in 1937 studied a park running along the Cascade summit from the Columbia River to the Canadian border, taking in Mount Baker, Glacier Peak, Mount St. Helens, Mount Adams and Mount Rainier. The study concluded the park would outrank any existing national park in scenic, recreational and wildlife values; it excluded almost everything below timberline, leaving the forests open to logging. The Washington State Planning Council, dominated by resource-industry figures, held hearings in timber-reliant towns in late 1939 that drew heavy opposition, and published a study in June 1940 recommending that the Forest Service remain in charge. North Cascades National Park was created in 1968 in the northern portion of area.	Proposed Five Ice Peaks National Park, npshistory.com Ice Peaks National Park, Columbia: The Magazine of Northwest History, 2009
Katahdin/Maine Woods National Park		Maine	1920, 1937, 1991, 2011	In 1920, eventual Governor Percival P. Baxter participated in an expedition to the top of Mount Katahdin to investigate its potential as a national park. Later in life, he would personally buy tracks of land and established Baxter State Park. U.S. Representative Owen Brewster introduced legislation for a Mt. Katahdin National Park in 1937. In 1991, New England-based conservation group RESTORE:The North Woods proposed a 3,200,000-acre (1,300,000 ha) Maine Woods National Park surrounding Baxter State Park. Roxanne Quimby, after speaking with RESTORE, began purchasing land around Baxter State Park, and revealed her plan for a Maine North Woods National Park in 2011. On August 24, 2016, President Barack Obama proclaimed 87,563 acres (35,435 ha) of her donated land as the Katahdin Woods and Waters National Monument.	Maine Woods National Park Photo-Documentation Project; RESTORE:The North Woods; A Maine Woods National Park?
Kaua'i National Park		Hawaii	1965	The National Park Service proposed a park connecting areas of public land, including Nā Pali Coast State Park, Waimea Canyon State Park, Haʻena State Park, and Kōkeʻe State Park. Contemporary coverage described it as about 97,000 acres (150 sq mi); opponents included some cabin owners on state-leased land, hunters, and sightseeing helicopter operators, who feared losing cabins, hunting grounds, and access.	Kauai National Park - A Proposal, NPS 1965
Killdeer Mountains National Park		North Dakota	1919-1933	The Killdeer Mountains in Dunn County, were proposed as a freestanding national park by a prominent group of North Dakotans in 1919, and were also considered for inclusion in what became Theodore Roosevelt National Park. Bills were introduced in seven consecutive Congresses without success: S. 2558 and H.R. 7286 in the 66th, S. 70 and H.R. 3188 in the 67th, H.R. 159 in the 68th, H.R. 239 and H.R. 6729 in the 69th, S. 4172, H.R. 299, H.R. 8177 and S.Res. 237 in the 70th, H.R. 239 in the 71st and H.R. 481 in the 72nd. The range is also the site of the Battle of Killdeer Mountain of July 28, 1864, between troops under General Alfred Sully and a large Lakota and Dakota encampment. The National Park Service identified the battlefield in 2010 as likely eligible for the National Register of Historic Places and flagged some 17,340 acres (7,020 ha) for further study, and its American Battlefield Protection Program later funded a survey by North Dakota State University. The land remains largely private and subject to oil and gas development; a small Killdeer Mountain Battlefield State Historic Site marks part of the battleground.	History of Legislation Relating to the National Park System Through the 82d Congress, NPS 1958 'No mistakes were made' at Killdeer Mountains, The Dickinson Press
Lake George National Park		Alaska	1937, 1958, 1961, 1967	A self-dumping glacial lake forty-four miles east of Anchorage, first proposed in 1937; a 1939 Park Service report found it an interesting phenomenon but lacking the national significance required for park or monument status. The Service restudied it in 1958, 1961 and 1967, when the Anchorage Times proposed park status. On July 26, 1968 Lake George became the first National Natural Landmark in Alaska.	"Do Things Right the First Time", NPS administrative history
Lake Tahoe National Park		California, Nevada	1897, 1917	John Muir, saddened by logging in the Lake Tahoe area, began campaigning for a national park in 1897. The proposal collapsed in Congress over concerns of federal control.	Why Lake Tahoe Never Became a National Park, Moonshineink, 2016
Lincoln National Park		Kentucky, Tennessee, Virginia	1922	At a meeting in Cincinnati on May 30, 1922, business leaders from Middlesboro proposed a Lincoln National Park at the Cumberland Gap, centered on Fern Lake, a reservoir formed by an earthen dam in 1890 that supplies Middlesboro's water. The idea drew support from local residents and from representatives of all three state governments. No park followed at the time. Cumberland Gap National Historical Park was authorized in 1940 as a historical rather than a scenic park, and Fern Lake itself remained outside it until the Fern Lake Conservation and Recreation Act of 2004 expanded the boundary to take in the lake and its roughly 4,500-acre (1,800 ha) watershed, which the park acquired between 2007 and 2009.	Cumberland Gap and Cumberland Gap National Historical Park, Tennessee Encyclopedia
Luquillo National Park		Puerto Rico	1934–1946	The possibility of a national park in Puerto Rico was first considered in 1934, when H. C. Bryant and George M. Wright reported that Luquillo National Forest met the highest national park standards but was efficiently administered by the Forest Service. Legislation to establish Luquillo National Park was introduced on April 29, 1936, and the Forest Service submitted a report strongly opposing it. In 1938 the Secretary of the Interior proposed exchanging Puerto Rico Reconstruction Administration lands for the forest.	Suggested Areas Resumes, NPS 1957
Magazine Mountain National Park		Arkansas	1949	The Paris Chamber of Commerce asked Senator J. William Fulbright to have the recreational area near Paris transferred from the Forest Service to the Park Service, referred to the Service in February 1949. The Service replied that Mount Magazine was not qualified for national park status and that the existing and proposed active recreational uses would not be in keeping with Service policies. Representative Boyd Tackett made a similar inquiry and separately proposed the area for national park status, receiving the same answer. It is now Mount Magazine State Park.	Suggested Areas Resumes, NPS 1957
Makoshika Badlands National Park		Montana	1938, 1945, 1957	The Glendive Chamber of Commerce promoted a Badlands National Park near Glendive in 1938, its secretary K. E. Burleigh writing to federal officials that the town was very short on scenery and places of interest and that a park would be one way to stop tourists in Glendive for a day or two. The U.S. Grazing Service director and later local interests renewed the proposal. It became Makoshika State Park in 1953.	Dilsaver & Wyckoff, "Failed National Parks in the Last Best Place", Montana 59:3 (2009)
Mattole-Humboldt National Park		California	1936	The National Park Service investigated the potential of a national park or national seashore recreation area on California's Lost Coast. Part of the area is now protected by the Bureau of Land Management in the King Range National Conservation Area.	Study of a National Seashore Recreation Area
Medicine Bow Range National Park		Wyoming	1932	Arthur Campbell, secretary of the Lions Club of Saratoga, petitioned Director Horace M. Albright on August 30, 1932 to designate part of the Snowy Range section of Medicine Bow National Forest a national park, noting that about 40 miles of the 82-mile Snowy Range Highway from Saratoga to Laramie ran through the finest part of the forest, crossing the divide just below the 12,005-foot (3,659 m) Medicine Bow Peak, with some 120 lakes within a small radius; copies went to the governor, both senators and the congressman. The route is now the Snowy Range Scenic Byway in Medicine Bow–Routt National Forest.	Proposed Medicine Bow Range National Park, File 0-32, npshistory.com
Moapa Valley National Park		Nevada	1929–1947	Lands in Clark County to the north, south and west of the town of St. Thomas, including the Lost City ruins and the Valley of Fire, were withdrawn for study by Executive Order 5105 on May 3, 1929. The Director's annual report for 1931 listed the proposed Moapa Valley National Park among the areas investigated that year. A draft proclamation for a Boulder Dam National Monument prepared in 1939 included the Valley of Fire among its lands; its justification noted that the Lost City had by then been flooded by Lake Mead, and no action followed. In 1947 Nevada's land management director raised a land exchange, and Wirth replied that the Service had long wished to add the Valley of Fire to the recreation area, but the land passed was by then Valley of Fire State Pakr.	Suggested Areas Resumes, NPS 1957
Mobile-Tensaw Delta National Park		Alabama	2013	Biologist E. O. Wilson proposed a large national park encompassing most of the Mobile-Tensaw River Delta to protect high levels of biodiversity in the region. In 2017, the National Park Service highlighted interest in the region in a report.	Protecting Biodiversity Through National Park System Expansion, National Parks Traveler; Push for a new national park in Alabama is an upstream battle, PBSNewsHour, 2016
Mojave National Park		California	1979	H.R.4461 first proposed a Mojave National Park on June 14, 1979. An earlier version of the California Desert Protection Act of 1994 (S.222), introduced by Sen. Alan Cranston continued this. It was eventually made Mojave National Preserve.	S.2061 - California Desert Protection Act of 1986
Moosehead Lake National Park		Maine	1951, 1954	The offices of Senators Margaret Chase Smith and Owen Brewster inquired in August and September 1951 about the possibility and procedures for seeking national park status for the area; information was supplied, but the origin of the requests was unknown and no concerted drive appeared to be under way. Lewis Kingman, a sporting camp owner at Rockwood, advocated the northern Moosehead Lake region for national park status in July 1954, and the Service cited the difficulties of acquiring land.	Suggested Areas Resumes, NPS 1957
Moraine National Park		Wisconsin	1958	Ray Zillmer proposed a narrow 500-mile (800 km) national park along the terminus moraine through Wisconsin. The National Park Service took interest in the idea, but instead proposed more concise park, with great interest for potential park units in Kettle Moraine State Forest and the Baraboo Range. U.S. Representative Henry S. Reuss introduced legislation for the park in 1958. After Zillmer's death in 1960, Reuss continued the idea into what is today the Ice Age National Scenic Trail and the Ice Age National Scientific Reserve.	Correspondence of Moraine Nation Park, npshistory.com
Mount Evans National Park		Colorado	1916–1919	Sponsored by Representative Benjamin C. Hilliard and Denver mayor Dewey C. Bailey. H.R. 9220 and S. 3587 were introduced, and Hilliard introduced H.R. 12276 on February 25, 1916. Horace M. Albright inspected the Mount Evans area in October 1918 and submitted a favorable report that December, which Director Stephen Mather conveyed to Bailey in July 1919; no further action is believed to have been taken.	Suggested Areas Resumes, NPS 1957
Mount Hood National Park		Oregon	1940, 2003	Amid talks of the Forest Service joining the Department of the Interior in 1940, there was a growing push for a Mount Hood National Park. Tom Kloster has run a campaign for creating a Mount Hood National Park & Preserve that would link together the Mount Hood National Forest and the Oregon side of Columbia River Gorge.	3 national parks in Oregon that never happened - OregonLive, 2016; Mount Hood National Park Campaign
Mount Mitchell National Park		North Carolina	1975–1979	Title VII of Public Law 94-518, enacted October 17, 1976, directed the Secretary of the Interior to report to Congress on the feasibility and suitability of creating a Mount Mitchell National Park around Mount Mitchell in Yancey County, at 6,684 feet (2,037 m) the highest point in the United States east of the Mississippi. The act originated as S. 400, introduced by Senator Edward Kennedy in January 1975, and passed the House in lieu of a companion bill. The resulting suitability and feasibility study, begun in May 1977 by a team from the Park Service's Denver Service Center, the national forests of North Carolina and the state parks office, covered some 245,000 acres (99,000 ha) of the Black and Craggy mountains northeast of Asheville. Measured against Great Smoky Mountains National Park, the high country compared favorably, while the valleys scored lower because of rapid unplanned suburban development; the team recommended that any boundary take in the ridges and upper slopes above the valleys. The proposal was dropped in 1979. The summit had been protected since 1915 as Mount Mitchell State Park, North Carolina's first state park, and remains a state park surrounded by Pisgah National Forest.	S.400 (Public Law 94-518), 1976; H.R.8091, 1977; S.1817, 1977
Mount Shasta National Park		California	1888, 1912	John Muir first proposed a Mount Shasta National Park in 1888, saying ""The Shasta region may be reserved as a national park, with special reference to the preservation of its fine forests and game. This should by all means be done". The idea again picked up steam, with John E. Raker introducing legislation in 1912. The bill made it out of committee with approval, but Congress ended before a vote.	The Mount Shasta National Park Movement: Its Origin and Development
Mount St. Helens National Park		Washington	2007	Forest Service cuts in 2007 led to the closing of two visitor centers at Mount St. Helens National Volcanic Monument, sparking a campaign to transfer the monument into the NPS as a National Park.	An area unlike any in the world: Make Mount St. Helens a national park - TheSeattleTimes
Natural Bridge National Park		Virginia	1911, 1934	The Natural Bridge in Rockbridge County, a limestone arch once owned by Thomas Jefferson, was the subject of a bill in the 62nd Congress, and its acquisition was suggested by a number of people, particularly from 1934 onward. The Park Service consistently replied that funds were lacking for acquisition by the government, but that consideration could be given should the site be purchased and offered as a donation. It remained in private hands until 2016, when it became Natural Bridge State Park.	Suggested Areas Resumes, NPS 1957; History of Legislation Relating to the National Park System Through the 82d Congress, NPS 1958
Navajo National Park		Arizona, Utah	1931–1943	Roger W. Toll, superintendent of Yellowstone National Park and the Park Service's primary inspector of proposed park areas in the West, inspected the Navajo reservation early in 1931 and produced a report recommending the establishment of a Navajo National Park; Director Horace M. Albright was pursuing consolidation of existing units into larger parks, and elevating Navajo National Monument to park status. Accounts of the intended boundary vary: the Park Service's own administrative history describes a park encompassing Monument Valley, Canyon de Chelly and other features with Navajo and Rainbow Bridge national monuments in a detached section, while a later compilation describes three detached areas at Navajo Mountain and Rainbow Bridge, Monument Valley and Tsegi Canyon. Toll believed Arizona would support the idea and the Indian Service could be persuaded, and made no mention of the desires of the Navajo people. A draft bill was prepared in 1933 and sent to the Indian Service for submission to the Navajo, who did not approve it. In 1943 the Navajo passed a resolution stating their wish to control all national monuments on their reservations and to have the Park Service relinquish its rights.	Navajo National Monument: A Place and Its People, NPS administrative history Suggested Areas Resumes, NPS 1957
Niobrara-Buffalo Prairie National Park		Nebraska	1990	In the 1991 legislation designating the Niobrara National Scenic River, a clause was included directing the NPS to study the potential of a 138,000-acre (56,000 ha) National Park along the corridor and on the edge of the Nebraska Sandhills. The NPS reported favorably in their final survey, but took no further official stance.	Can We Save Vanishing Grasslands?, National Parks Traveler Niobrara National Park Study-Nebraska, National Park Service
Noatak National Park		Alaska	1979	An earlier version of the Alaska National Interest Lands Conservation Act (S.222), introduced by Sen. John Durkin included making a Noatak National Park. It was eventually made Noatak National Preserve.	S.222 - Alaska National Interest Lands Conservation Act of 1979
Ocmulgee Mounds National Park & Preserve		Georgia	2017	Campaign for designating the Ocmulgee Mounds National Historical Park, and surrounding lands including the Bond Swamp National Wildlife Refuge, as a national park & preserve along the Ocmulgee River south of Macon, Georgia. U.S. Senators Jon Ossoff and Raphael Warnock introduced legislation for the creation of the park in 2024.	Ocmulgee National Park & Preserve Initiative; 4 lawmakers introduce legislation to make Ocmulgee Mounds state's first National Park and Preserve; An Economic Analysis of the Proposed Ocmulgee National Park and Preserve - NPCA
Okefenokee National Park		Georgia	1929	HR. 17277 was introduced in the 70th Congress, which commanded the secretary of the Interior to study the potential of establishing an Okefenokee National Park in the Okefenokee Swamp.	History of Legislation Relating to The National Park System Through the 82d Congress
Oregon Coast National Park		Oregon	1938	Effort by locals for designation of land between Gold Beach, Oregon and Brookings, Oregon to be designated as a National Park. U.S. Senator Charles McNary introduced a bill in congress.	In search of the lost Oregon Coast National Park, TheOregonian, 2017
Ouachita National Park		Arkansas	1929	Effort by U.S. Senator Joseph T. Robinson and U.S. Representative Otis Wingo for a National Park near what is now the Caney Creek Wilderness in Ouachita National Forest. Ended with a pocket veto by President Calvin Coolidge.	TOM DILLARD: Arkansas once envisioned as home for Ouachita National Park - ArkansasDemocratGazette, 2020
Owyhee National Park		Oregon, Idaho, Nevada	1990–1995	Proposed for the Owyhee Canyonlands where Oregon, Idaho and Nevada meet, in a brochure issued by the Committee for Idaho's High Desert and the Greater Alturas Development Committee, which described the region as the largest unprotected wild area remaining in the lower 48 states and larger than Yellowstone National Park, and called for making what it termed the decades-old vision of an Owyhee National Park a reality. It counted 2.7 million wild acres in Oregon and 1.8 million in Idaho, with private ownership at about one percen. National park designation would have been paired with Wild and Scenic River status for parts of the Owyhee, Bruneau and Jarbidge and with adjoining wilderness areas. A coalition including the same committee proposed a 2,700,000-acre (1,100,000 ha) Owyhee-Bruneau Canyonlands National Monument in Idaho in 2000; the Owyhee Public Land Management Act designated wilderness on the Idaho side in 2009; and proposals for wilderness or a national monument of about 1,100,000 acres (450,000 ha) on the Oregon side have continued since.	Owyhee National Park brochure, npshistory.com What's next for the Owyhee Canyonlands?, High Country News
Ozark (Taum Sauk) National Park		Missouri	1933, 1947	A proposal for the Black River valley in the Missouri Ozarks. While from many sources, the proposal is from L. L. Richardson's article "Taum Sauk for a National Park" in the Missouri Conservationist, and was considered by NPS. Taum Sauk Mountain State Park now covers part of the area.	Suggested Areas Resumes, NPS 1957
Palisades of the Hudson National Park		New Jersey, New York	1895–1899	Bills to establish a national park at the Palisades were introduced in the 54th Congress as S. 2861, H. 2187 and H.R. 9511, and in the 55th as S. 2920 and H.R. 5170, each accompanied by a memorial of the New Jersey legislature. They arose from the campaign against the quarries that were dynamiting the cliffs for trap rock, led from the 1890s by the American Scenic and Historic Preservation Society and from 1895 by the New Jersey State Federation of Women's Clubs. New York and New Jersey legislated jointly in 1900, Governors Theodore Roosevelt and Foster Voorhees signing the act that created the Palisades Interstate Park Commission, which acquired the cliffs with public money and large gifts from J. P. Morgan, John D. Rockefeller and others, and formally opened Palisades Interstate Park in 1909.	History of Legislation Relating to the National Park System Through the 82d Congress, NPS 1958; History, Palisades Interstate Park Commission
Palm Canyon National Park		California	1908, 1920, 1922, 1933, 1937, 1951, 1962	Repeated proposals to protect the palm canyons south of Palm Springs in Riverside County. A Tahquitz Peak and Palm Canyon National Monument was first suggested in 1908. A national park proposal reached Congress in 1920 and failed because the Agua Caliente Band of Cahuilla Indians, on whose reservation the canyons lie, did not support a bill centered on their lands about which they had not been consulted. Congress authorized a park in 1922, but it was not carried out. A separate proposal for nearby Borrego Palm Canyon was rejected in 1933 as not significant by comparison. The canyons now lie within the Santa Rosa and San Jacinto Mountains National Monument, established in 2000, which the tribe co-manages.	Testimony on the Santa Rosa and San Jacinto Mountains National Monument, U.S. House Committee on Resources, 2000
Palo Duro Canyon National Park		Texas	1906	The Canyon City Commercial Club passed a resolution in favor of a National Park for the Palo Duro Canyon in 1906. U.S. Representative John H. Stephens introduced multiple acts establishing the park between 1908 and 1915.	Texas State Historical Association, 1976
Porcupine Mountains National Park		Michigan	1928–1944	Individuals and conservation agencies were interested from 1928 onward. Following an investigation and report by a Park Service group headed by Ben Thompson in 1938, the area was approved for national park status, and negotiations followed to bring part of the recommended acreage into federal ownership by donation; the plans were dropped during the Second World War. Aldo Leopold advocated preservation of "The Great Uncut" in 1942, and in 1943 the Michigan Conservation Commission asked the legislature to acquire roughly 46,000 acres (19,000 ha) in Gogebic and Ontonagon counties. The legislature appropriated $1,000,000 in 1944 to buy the Porcupine tract and protect its old-growth forest from logging and mining, and Porcupine Mountains Wilderness State Park was established in 1945.	Suggested Areas Resumes, NPS 1957
Pothole Prairie National Park		North Dakota	1966–1968	Proposed as a Prairie National Park and named in the investigating planner's report as a possible "Pothole Prairie National Park". In the Prairie Pothole Region of North Dakota. After Director George B. Hartzog Jr. stated in a July 1966 National Geographic article that the Park Service was seeking a new national park in the prairie grasslands, a number of North Dakotans pressed through Senator Quentin Burdick for consideration of the Antelope Hills in Pierce County. Park Planner H. Raymond Gregg investigated on August 23–24, 1968 with botanist Robert L. Burgess of the State University of North Dakota, examining a block of some 25,000–30,000 acres (10,000–12,000 ha) centred on the Antelope Lakes. Gregg reported that the area held fine blocks of little-altered native prairie but was so fragmented that a long restoration would be needed to create the scene of primitive vastness the Service had set as its criterion, and that four or five of the plant communities sought in a True Prairie park were absent or barely present. He concluded that an area composed there would not supplant the need for a True Prairie National Park. He suggested the name "Pothole Prairie National Park" should the Service proceed, and recommended in the alternative that North Dakota or The Nature Conservancy be approached. No park followed.	Antelope Hills: Evaluation as a Potential Prairie National Park, NPS 1968
Red River Gorge National Park		Kentucky	1974	On October 9, 1974, Senate Resolution 4107 was introduced by Senator Marlow Cook, which would designate a Red River Gorge National Park. The park was proposed to stop the Red River Lake Project authorized by the Flood Control Act of 1962, and would preserve the designated RRG Geologic Area under the Department of Interior. Senator Cook spoke of broad community support in his address to the senate.	A bill to establish the Red River Gorge National Park, Ky., to deauthorize the Red River Lake project.
Ricketts Glen National Park		Pennsylvania	1930s	The area of what is now Ricketts Glen State Park was approved to be a national park, with the Civilian Conservation Corps establishing a camp in the area. World War II put an end to these plans.	History of Ricketts Glen State Park
Rock Creek National Park		District of Columbia	2017, 2024, 2026	Delegate Eleanor Holmes Norton first asked Congress in 2017 to redesignate Rock Creek Park as a national park, arguing that the designation would make its historical significance clear. She introduced the Rock Creek National Park Act in April 2024 and reintroduced it in 2026, noting that the park was established in 1890 as the first federally managed urban park and the third federal park created, after Yellowstone and Sequoia.	H.R.8122 - Rock Creek National Park Act of 2024
Rota National Park		Northern Mariana Islands	2009	Rota Senator Diego Songao proposed a national park to U.S. Delegate Gregorio Sablan, who then lobbied for a special resource study of the idea. In 2023, the NPS found that the area meets many qualities of a national park, but that NPS management is not directly needed.	SaipanTribune, 2013
Royal Gorge National Park		Colorado	1935, 1940	Near Cañon City. Named in a 1935 memorandum as having been removed from the permanent list of proposed areas. Local interests revived the proposal for the park in Royal Gorge in 1940, but following a hearing at Cañon City on November 9, 1940 the area was determined not suitable for national park status.	Suggested Areas Resumes, NPS 1957
Salmon River National Park		Idaho	1948, 1954	Proposed for central Idaho by Robert L. Wood of Seattle in January 1948, covering a tract about 150 miles long through the Salmon River canyon, the "River of No Return". Senator Henry Dworshak forwarded a further proposal from Henry Benson in March 1954; Assistant Director Allen cited the difficulties but said the Service hoped to study the area's park. Much of the area lay within existing national forests and is now within the Frank Church–River of No Return Wilderness.	Suggested Areas Resumes, NPS 1957
San Rafael Swell National Park		Utah	1990	The San Rafael Swell in Emery County has been proposed repeatedly as a national park. In 1990, the Utah Wilderness Association proposed designating 300,000 acres (120,000 ha) of its canyon and mesa country as Utah's sixth national park, reported in the press as an "Emery National Park"; the Emery County Development Council also proposed national park status for 210,000 acres (85,000 ha) in the northern Swell. County Commission chairman Clyde Thompson said a majority of residents would oppose any park, fearing it would halt grazing and oil, gas and mineral exploration and curtail camping, and the commissioners proposed historical conservation areas instead. Governor Mike Leavitt asked President George W. Bush in 2002 to proclaim a 620,000-acre (250,000 ha) San Rafael Swell National Monument, which was never acted on. The John D. Dingell Jr. Conservation, Management, and Recreation Act of 2019 instead designated a 217,000-acre (88,000 ha) San Rafael Swell Recreation Area under the Bureau of Land Management, extensive wilderness, and the adjacent Jurassic National Monument.	Emery National Park Meets With Opposition, Deseret News, 1990; Missing From The System? Utah's San Rafael Swell, National Parks Traveler, 2012
Sawtooth National Park		Idaho	1960	U.S. Senator Frank Church proposed a national park for the Sawtooth Range. After introducing legislation for either a park or National Recreation Area, and after pushback for locals, the Sawtooth National Recreation Area was established in 1972.	Why there's no national park in the Sawtooths — and why that matters Boise State Public Radio News, 2022
Shawnee National Park & Climate Preserve		Illinois	2021	Local group pushing for transferring the Shawnee National Forest to the National Park Service, citing logging and the need for preserving eastern forest environments. The city of Carbondale, Illinois passed a resolution in 2022 in support of the proposal.	Shawnee National Park? -IllinoisTimes, 2023; Shawnee Forest Defense
Ship Island National Park		Mississippi	1937–1946	An island off Biloxi that drew active interest from 1937 to 1942, with Senator Pat Harrison, Representative William M. Colmer and Luther Maples prominent in the effort. A proposal to establish it as a national monument was favorably considered but negotiations stalemated in April 1942. The Biloxi Chamber of Commerce called for a national park in July 1946; Acting Director Hillory A. Tolson offered to reinvestigate. Colmer proposed a Gulf Islands recreation area including Ship Island in 1955. Ship Island became part of Gulf Islands National Seashore in 1971.	
Sierra Madre National Park		California	1916	U.S. Representative Charles Hiram Randall introduced legislation to create a national park out of the San Gabriel Mountains. Despite broad local support, Stephen Mather dismissed the idea.	The Lost Plan to Create a National Park in L.A.'s Backyard, 2021
Silver Falls National Park		Oregon	1902, 2008	In 1902, June D Drake began to campaign for park status of Silver Falls State Park. In 1926, however, an inspector for the National Park Service rejected the area for park status because of a proliferation of unattractive stumps after years of logging. In 2008, Fred Girod of the Oregon House of Representatives sought federal designation of the area as a national park via a house joint memorial to the United States Congress, but the bill died in committee.	Silver Falls State Park and the Early Environmental Movement, Oregon Historical Society, 2011
Sonoran Desert National Park		Arizona	1966, 1998	Stewart Udall, then as Secretary of the Department of the Interior and as a former Arizona U.S. Representative, proposed a sprawling Sonoran Desert National Park in 1966. The proposal included the Organ Pipe Cactus National Monument and Cabeza Prieta National Wildlife Refuge. In 1998, a group of citizens resurrected the proposal.	Sonoran Desert National Park, Arizona: A Proposal - NPS; Sonoran Desert National Park, National Border, National Park: A History of Organ Pipe Cactus National Monument; The Attempt to Create the Sonora Desert National Park, DesertUSA, 2000
Tensas Swamp National Park		Louisiana	1938	The Audubon Society persuaded U.S. Senator Allen J. Ellender to establish a National Park in Tensas River National Wildlife Refuge, the last remaining possible refuge of the now thought-to-be extinct Ivory-billed Woodpecker	The Resurrection of the Lord God Bird, Wisconsin Academy of Science, Arts, and Letters, 2015
Three Forks National Park		Montana	1938, 1947, 1965	Proposed for Gallatin County at the Missouri Headwaters State Park by local residents including Margaret Thompson of the Northwest Conservation League, and by Representative Arnold Olsen in 1965. The Park Service rejected the proposal. The site having been first proposed in 1938 as one of seven Montana areas connected with the Lewis and Clark Expedition.	Dilsaver & Wyckoff, "Failed National Parks in the Last Best Place", Montana 59:3 (2009)
Three Sisters National Park		Oregon	1927, 1935	In the central Cascades of Deschutes and Lane counties. The original suggestion came from Judge Robert W. Sawyer and local citizens of Bend in 1927. The proposed area lay entirely within two national forests and the greater part of it was later a state game refuge; the core became the Three Sisters Wilderness in 1964.	Suggested Areas Resumes, NPS 1957
Vermejo Park National Park		New Mexico	1933–1938	350,000 acres (140,000 ha) of the Maxwell Land Grant in Colfax County, owned in 1933 by Los Angeles Times publisher Harry Chandler. When Associate Director Arthur Demaray met Chandler in 1933 the impression was given that he might consider donating the property if it were found suitable for national park or monument purposes. A Region Three special report of October 1938 concluded that the area would take a valuable position in the system. Defense activities delayed a further visit and there was no further action. The land is now the privately owned Vermejo Park Ranch.	Suggested Areas Resumes, NPS 1957
Wallowa National Park		Oregon	1927–1949	The Chamber of Commerce of La Grande adopted a national park in the Wallowa Mountains as an objective in about 1927, and a Wallowa National Park Association was formed to campaign for it the following year. Roger W. Toll and Thomas C. Vint inspected some 66,000 acres (27,000 ha) for the Park Service and found the area valuable for recreation but lacking features of national significance; a second inspection in 1936 reported that the sponsors' chief interest had become the publicity a park would bring. Senator Charles L. McNary revived the idea in 1938 with a larger proposal taking in the Snake River canyon, which drew organized opposition from Wallowa County, stockmen and neighboring communities. Assistant Secretary C. Girard Davidson closed the matter in 1949. Much of the area is now the Eagle Cap Wilderness.	Proposed Wallowa Mountains National Park, npshistory.com Suggested Areas Resumes, NPS 1957
White Mountain National Park		New Hampshire, Maine	1932, 1939	Elizabeth L. MacQueen of the Anglo-American Society of America first raised the possibility of creating a national park in the White Mountains, with considerable correspondence on the subject during 1932. In 1939, largely through the efforts of Harlan P. Kelsey of East Boxford, Massachusetts, Park Service personnel examined the area's possibilities for park establishment. There was opposition to any change of administration from the Forest Service to the Park Service, but in August 1939 a form of proclamation and supporting papers, prepared at the request of the Secretary of the Interior, were submitted for consideration; the papers were later recovered from the Secretary's office and no further action is recorded. The area remains the White Mountain National Forest.	Suggested Areas Resumes, NPS 1957
White River Plateau National Park		Colorado	1889–1891	A bill to establish a national park on the White River Plateau of north-western Colorado, S. 4111, was introduced in the 51st Congress. No park was created. Within months of that Congress adjourning, the Forest Reserve Act of March 3, 1891 gave the President power to set aside forest reserves, and on October 16, 1891 Benjamin Harrison proclaimed the 1,198,080-acre (484,850 ha) White River Plateau Timber Land Reserve — the second forest reserve in the United States, after the Yellowstone Park Timber Land Reserve, and the first in Colorado. The designation was bitterly resented locally, the Meeker Herald calling it an outrage and urging the citizens of Rio Blanco County to rise against it. The reserve is now the White River National Forest, the most visited national forest in the country.	History of Legislation Relating to the National Park System Through the 82d Congress, NPS 1958; Becoming the White River National Forest, Aspen Journalism
Wichita Mountains National Park		Oklahoma	1930	HR. 13191 was introduced in the 71st Congress, which would designate a Wichita Mountains National Park.	History of Legislation Relating to The National Park System Through the 82d Congress
Yukon–Charley National Park		Alaska	1979	An earlier version of the Alaska National Interest Lands Conservation Act (S.222), introduced by Sen. John Durkin included making a Yukon-Charley National Park. It was eventually made Yukon–Charley Rivers National Preserve.	S.222 - Alaska National Interest Lands Conservation Act of 1979

== See also ==
- America's Most Endangered Places
- List of proposed national monuments of the United States
- List of threatened historic sites in the United States
- List of national monuments of the United States
- List of national parks of the United States
- List of national memorials of the United States
- List of areas in the United States National Park System
- National Conservation Lands
