= Ice Age Trail =

Long-distance hiking trail in the United States

Coordinates: 43°26′01.8″N 89°43′20.9″W

Ice Age National Scenic Trail
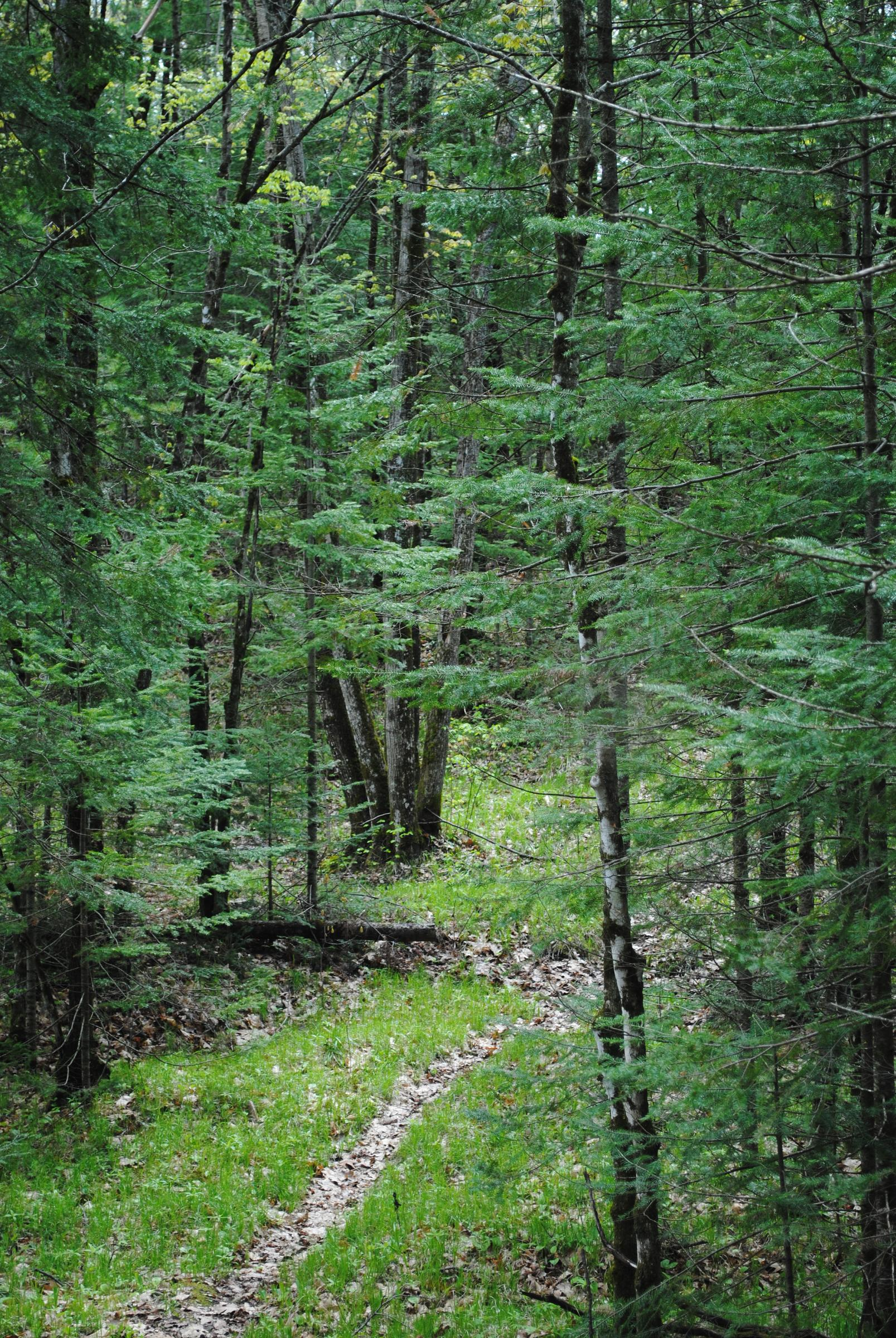
- The Ice Age Trail's Wood Lake segment in Taylor County
- Length: 675 miles (1,086 km) completed 1,200 miles (1,900 km) planned
- Location: Wisconsin, United States
- Designation: National Scenic Trail
- Trailheads: Potawatomi State Park, Door County, Wisconsin; Interstate State Park near St. Croix Falls, Wisconsin
- Use: Hiking, snowshoeing
- Highest point: Lookout Mountain, Lincoln County, 1,920 ft (590 m)
- Lowest point: Lakeshore of Lake Michigan, 580 ft (180 m)
- Difficulty: Easy to moderate, varies by location
- Months: Year-round, subject to weather conditions
- Sights: Glacial landforms
- Website: Ice Age Trail Alliance; NPS site

Trail map
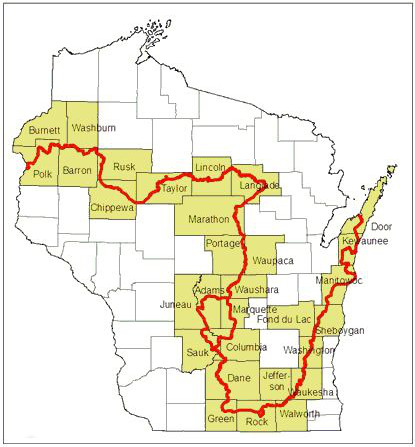

The Ice Age Trail is a National Scenic Trail winding 1,200 miles (1,900 km) through the state of Wisconsin in the United States. The trail is administered by the National Park Service, and is constructed and maintained by private and public agencies including the Ice Age Trail Alliance, a non-profit and member volunteer-based organization with local chapters. It became an official unit of the National Park System in 2023.

== Route ==
The trail roughly follows the edge of the terminal moraine deposited by glaciers during the last Ice Age. As the route traverses the moraine, it sometimes meanders into areas west of the moraine, including the Driftless Area in southwestern Wisconsin. The trail passes through 30 of Wisconsin's 72 counties, from the northwestern part of the state to the Lake Michigan shoreline in the east. The western end of the trail is at Interstate State Park along the St. Croix River, which defines the border between northwestern Wisconsin and eastern Minnesota. The trail's eastern terminus lies at Potawatomi State Park, on Wisconsin's Door Peninsula near the city of Sturgeon Bay.

Along its route, the trail crosses numerous city and county parks, state parks and forests, state wildlife and natural areas, and the Chequamegon-Nicolet National Forest. The trail often coincides with other trails within various county and municipal parks. It passes through the land of various owners, including the Wisconsin Department of Natural Resources, the Ice Age Trail Alliance, and hundreds of private citizens.

As of 2014, the trail was 1,197.7 miles (1,927.5 km) long. The trail separates into two segments just north of Devil's Lake State Park. The western portion of the trail, 92 miles (148 km) in length, is referred to as the Western Bifurcation. The Western Bifurcation consists mostly of proposed trail sections (though several miles of established trail do exist). The Western Bifurcation is rejoined by its 75-mile eastern counterpart near the town of Coloma. Though the eastern portion of the trail is more readily developed than its western counterpart, both are officially recognized portions of the Ice Age Trail. As of 2008, the trail consisted of 467 miles (752 km) of traditional hiking paths, 103.2 miles (166.1 km) of multi-use trails, and 529.3 miles (851.8 km) of connecting roads and sidewalks. As of October 2020, 675 miles (1,086 km) is completed with over 400 miles (640 km) connected by connecting routes (usually roads).

The Ice Age Trail has one of a few National Side Trails, the Timms Hill National Trail. National Side Trails are national trails established by the National Trails System Act. The ten-mile Timms Hill Trail connects the Ice Age Trail with Timms Hill, Wisconsin's highest point, which is located in Price County.

== History ==
The Ice Age Trail began as conservationist Ray Zillmer's idea for having an "Ice Age National Park" of 500 miles (800 km), starting at St. Croix Falls, going south through Madison, northeast through the Kettle Moraine areas, and finally ending near Sturgeon Bay. The park would travel through the terminal moraine of the most recent glacier to push through Wisconsin about 10,000 years ago. He envisioned that the park would protect features like kames, drumlins, and kettle moraines.

In 1958, Zillmer founded the Ice Age Park & Trail Foundation (now the Ice Age Trail Alliance (IATA)). In a 1959 interview in Wisconsin Alumnus magazine, Zillmer emphasized the importance of prioritizing the project: "This land must be purchased soon, before the population explosion following the opening of the St. Lawrence waterways affects Wisconsin, before the hills are pre-empted by private homes and the land becomes too expensive."

In December 1960, Zillmer died. The National Park Service decided a few months later, in 1961, that a long park was not feasible. In 1964, Wisconsin congressman Henry S. Reuss resurrected the idea, sponsoring the Ice Age National Scientific Reserve bill, which was passed and signed. It established nine units that he hoped would be connected by a trail (six were utilized).

In 1968, Wisconsin U.S. Senator Gaylord Nelson co-sponsored the National Trails System Act, which established the Appalachian Trail and Pacific Crest Trail.

During the summer of 1974, Reuss’ Legislative Assistant, James H. Rathlesberger, led a team of three Reuss staff routing the trail across Wisconsin. The trail was finally established by an Act of Congress in 1980, in large part due to the efforts of Reuss, who a few years before had authored the book On the Trail of the Ice Age (1976).

The previous year, during the summer of 1979, the first person to backpack the entire length of the Ice Age Trail, which had not yet been formally established, was 20-year-old James J. Staudacher of Shorewood, Wisconsin. He started at Potawatomi State Park in May 1979. Staudacher received maps with the proposed route and supply packages from Reuss and completed the walk at St. Croix Falls in August. Portions of the trail used existing trails in the northern unit of Kettle Moraine State Forest.

In 2023, the National Park Service recognized the trail as a unit of the National Park Service. Two other national scenic trails also became the country’s newest units of the National Park Service.

== Use ==
The trail is open primarily to hiking, although other activities are allowed where the trail follows other existing routes. A 2019 survey gave an estimated annual usage of 2.3 million people for the trail.

The trail is divided into just over one hundred segments. These segments range in length from about 1 to 16 miles (2 to 26 km). Although segmented, the transition between segments is often simply crossing a road running through the woods, where a sign welcomes you to the next segment.

The trail offers numerous options for longer-distance treks, with camping facilities, including shelters, available in both units of the Kettle Moraine State Forest. More recently, the Trail Alliance has developed several "dispersed camping areas" (DCAs), spaced to encourage more overnight backpacking treks. As of January 2023, 22 DCAs have been developed.

On the northwestern third of the trail, tent camping is allowed in some areas (particularly in Lincoln and Langlade Counties), provided tents are placed at least 200 feet (61 m) from the trail.

As of 2020, 19 local IATA chapters are working to try to turn connecting routes into permanent segments. The chapters' biggest obstacle has been acquiring land from private owners and permanently protecting it. Several trail chapters offer awards for completing hikes of all segments within their jurisdiction, and the Alliance also has a "cold cache" program to encourage hikers to seek out glacial features along the trail using GPS receivers.

One study of trail users found that those who stay overnight are more likely to camp than use other forms of lodging.

== Sights along the trail ==
Primary attractions include topography left by glaciation in the Last Ice Age. Glacial features along the trail include kettles (usually as a kettle lake), potholes, eskers, kames, and glacial erratics. Many of the best examples of glacial features in Wisconsin are exhibited in units of the Ice Age National Scientific Reserve, most of which lie along the trail.

Numerous species of mammals can be seen along the trail, including red fox, American red squirrel, white-tailed deer, porcupine, black bear and grey wolf. Birds seen along the southern part of the trail include the Acadian flycatcher, Henslow's sparrow, red-headed woodpecker or hooded warbler. In contrast, further north white-throated sparrows, ruffed grouse and bald eagles become more common.

== Gallery ==
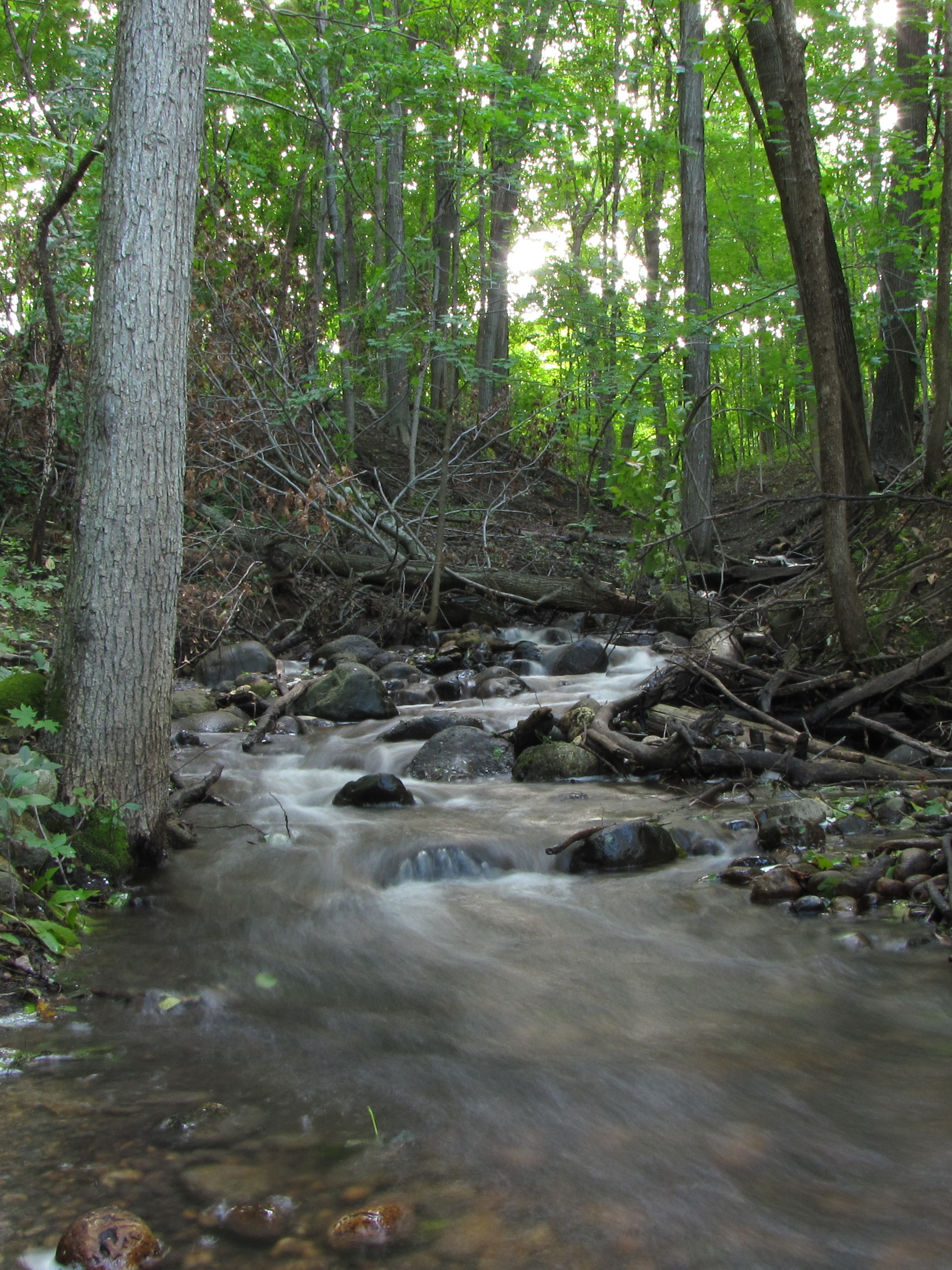
A creek along the Monches segment in Waukesha County

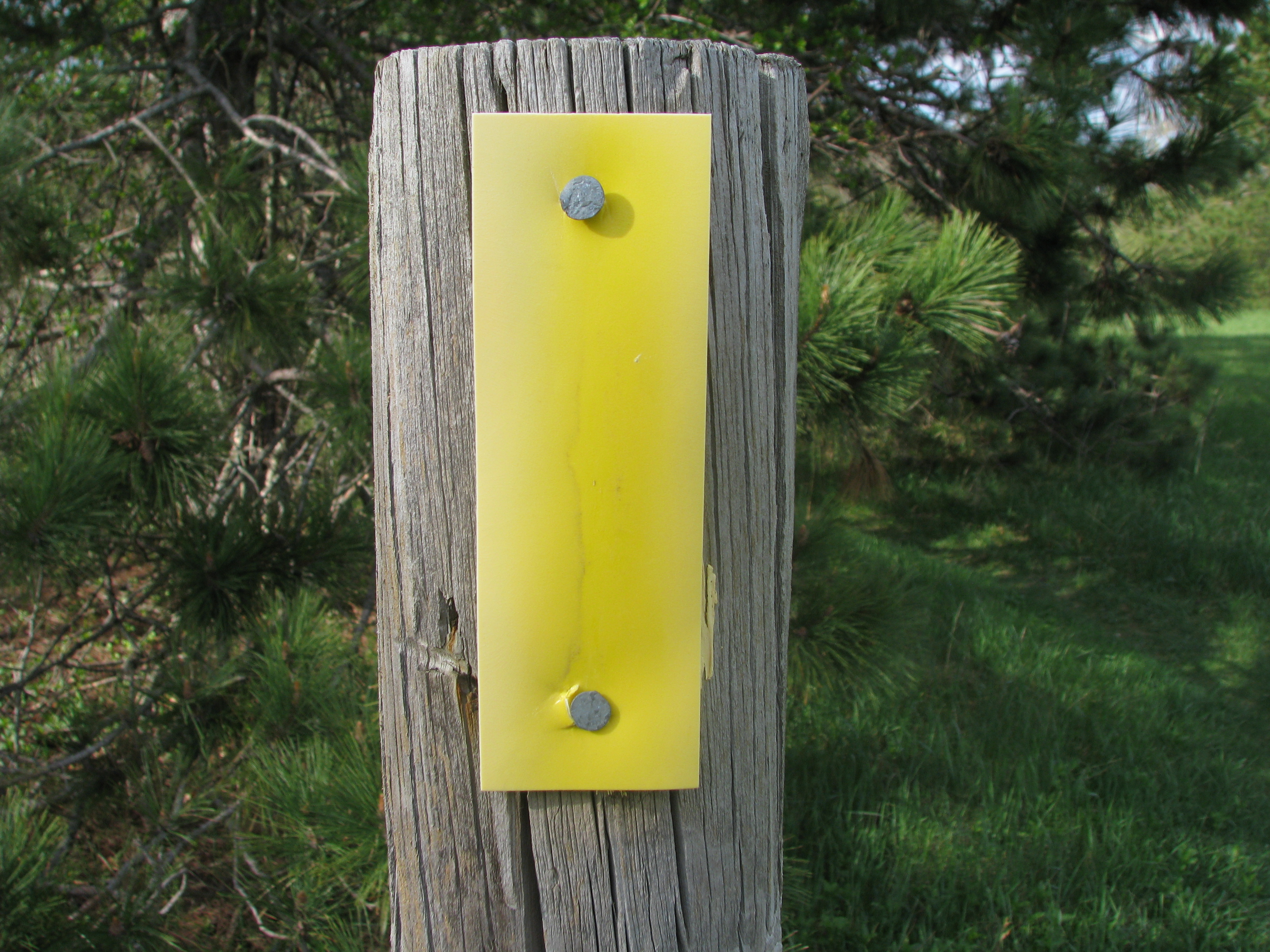
Yellow blazes mark the path of the trail.

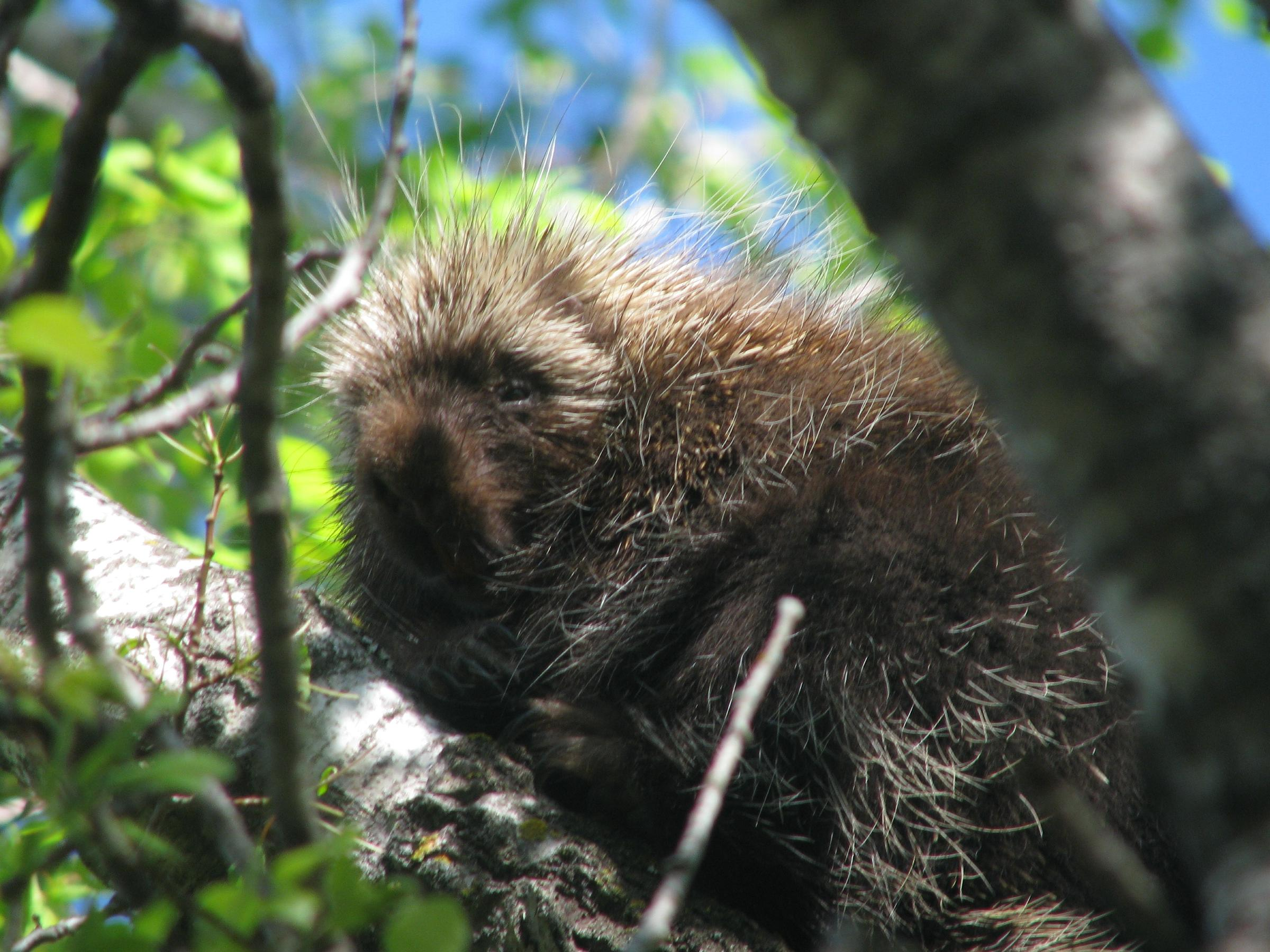
A porcupine in Lincoln County's New Wood State Wildlife Area

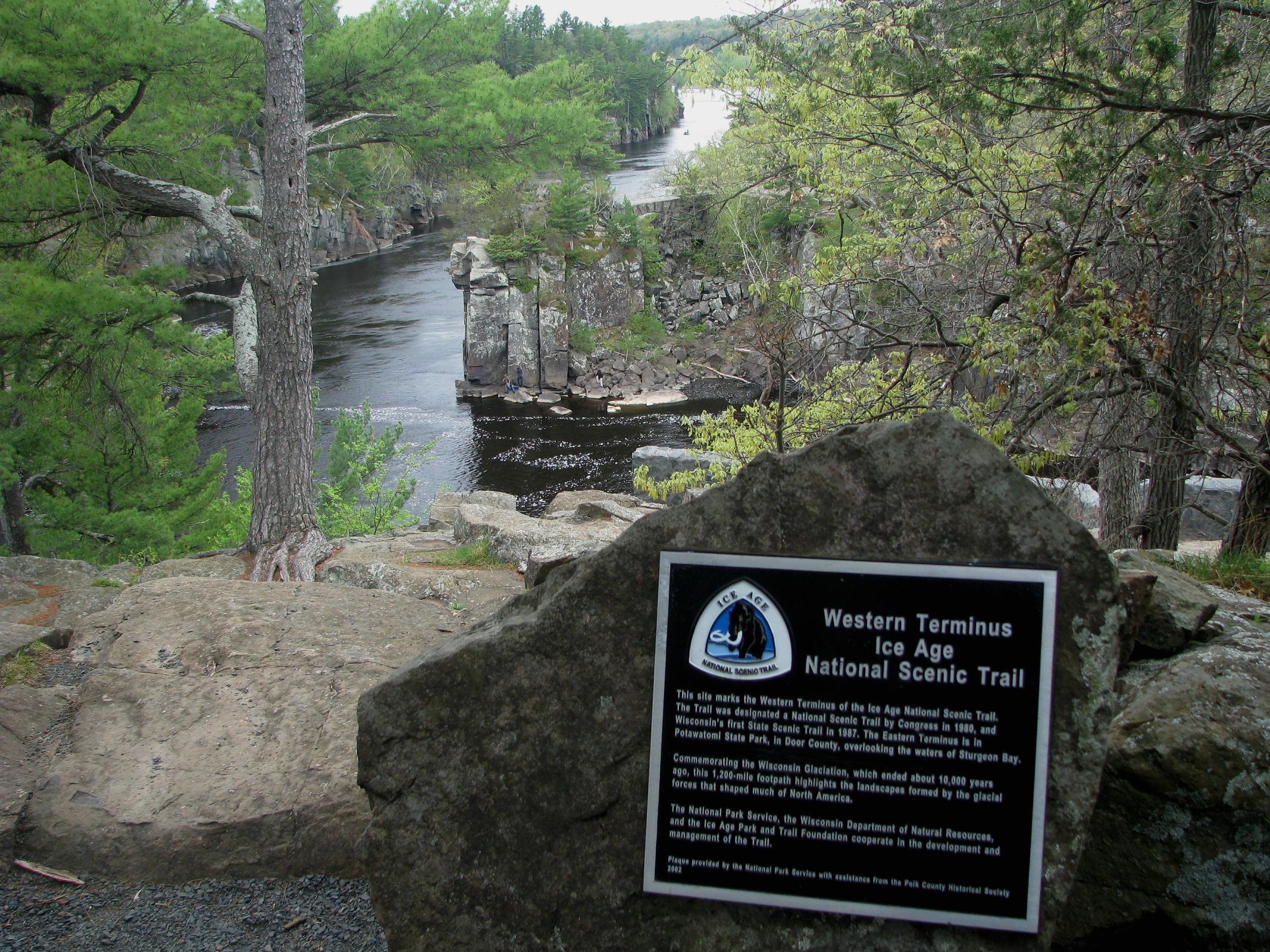
Western terminus of the trail at Interstate State Park in St. Croix Falls

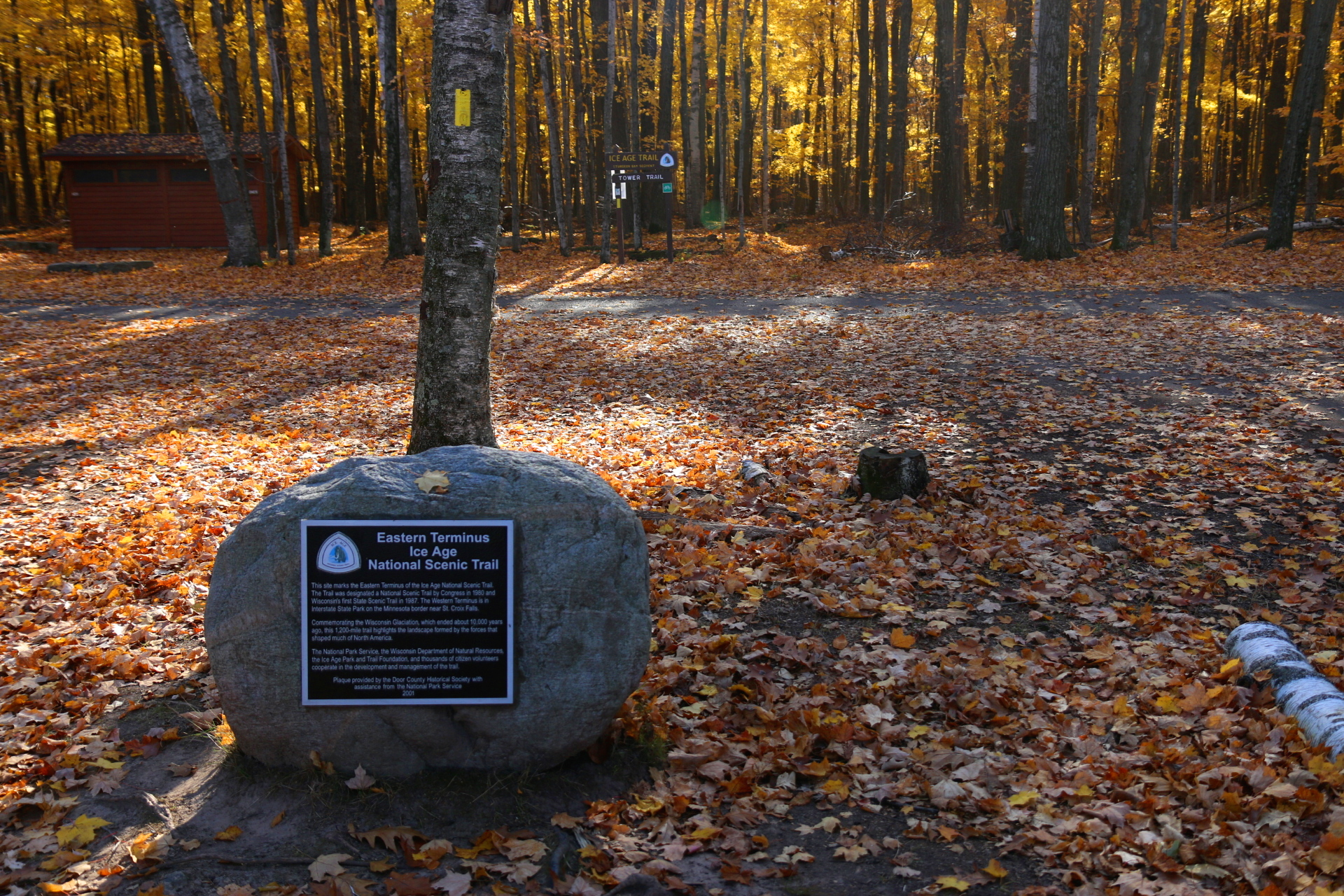
Eastern terminus of the trail at Potawatomi State Park along Wisconsin's Door Peninsula

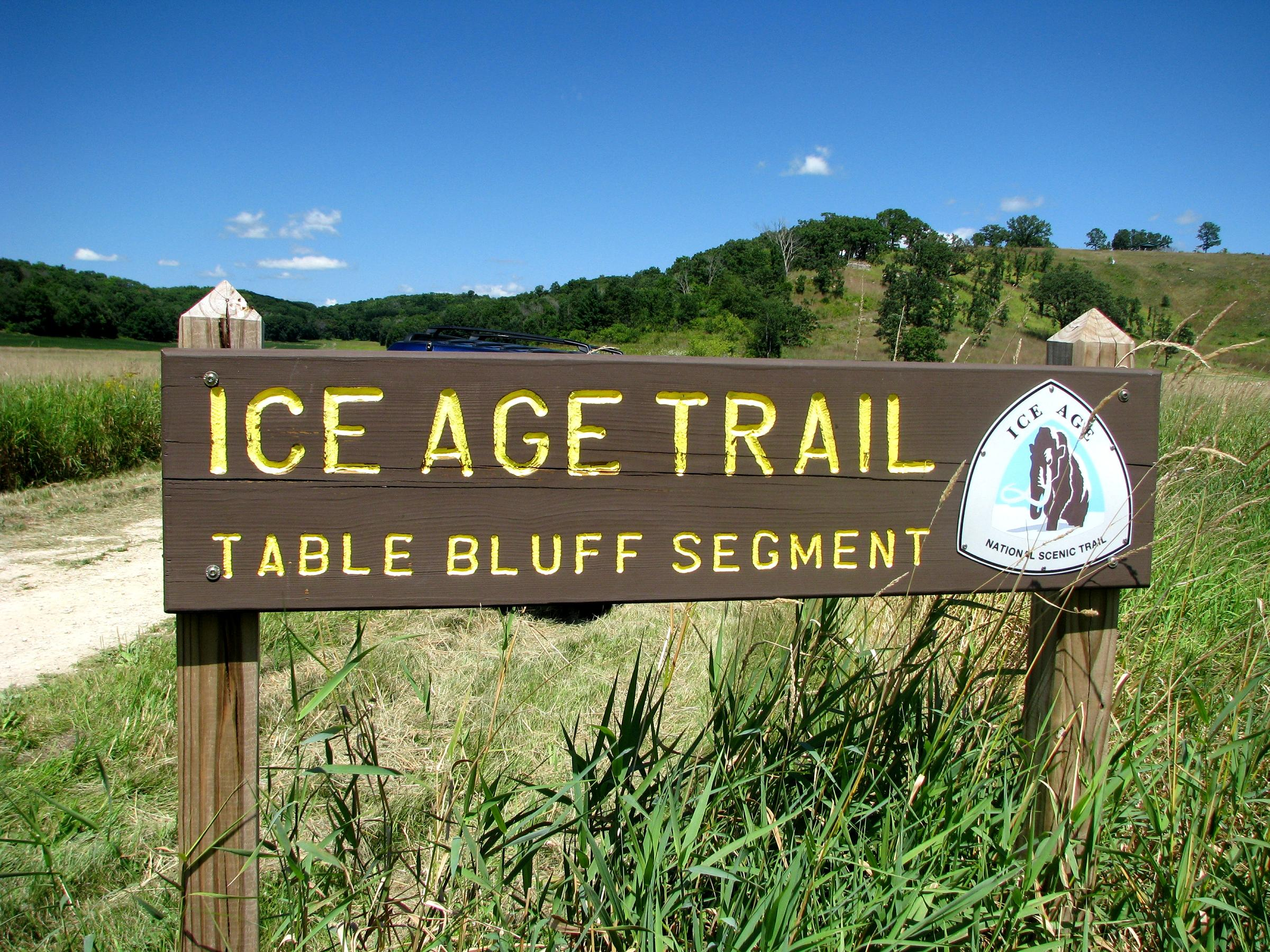
Sign at the Table Bluff segment near Cross Plains

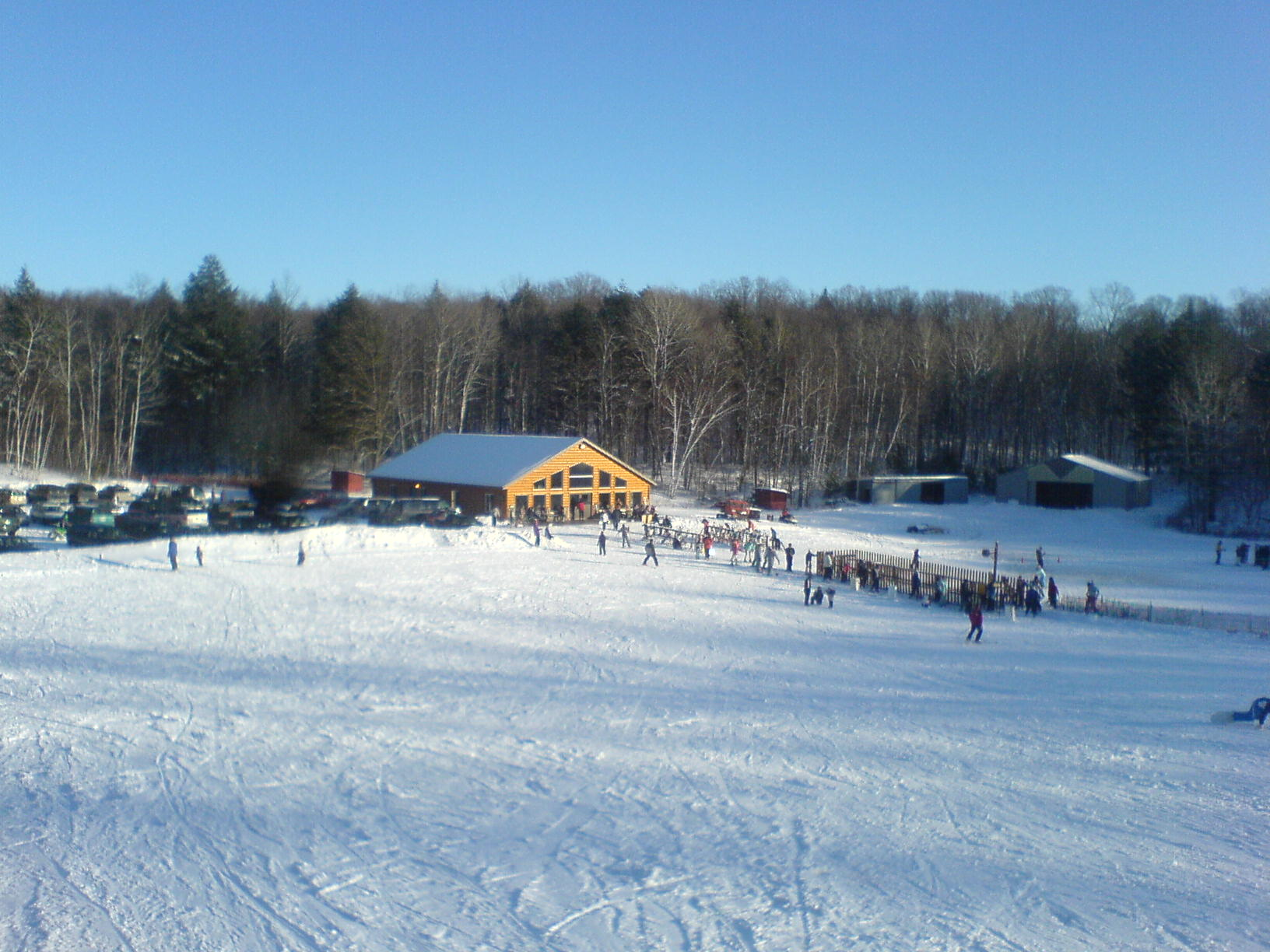
The Kettlebowl Ski Area near Bryant lies along the trail.

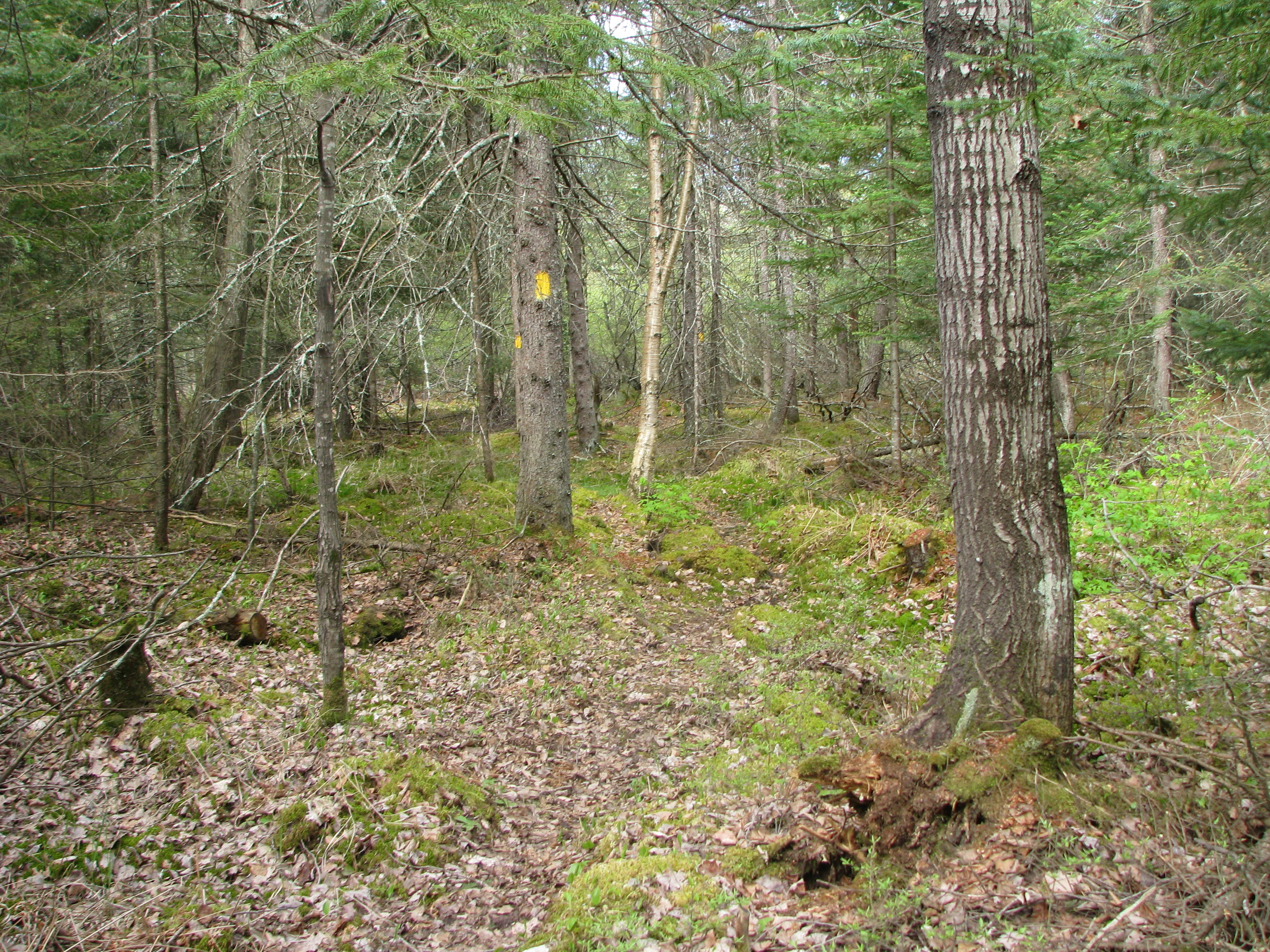
Northern landscape in Lincoln County's New Wood State Wildlife Area

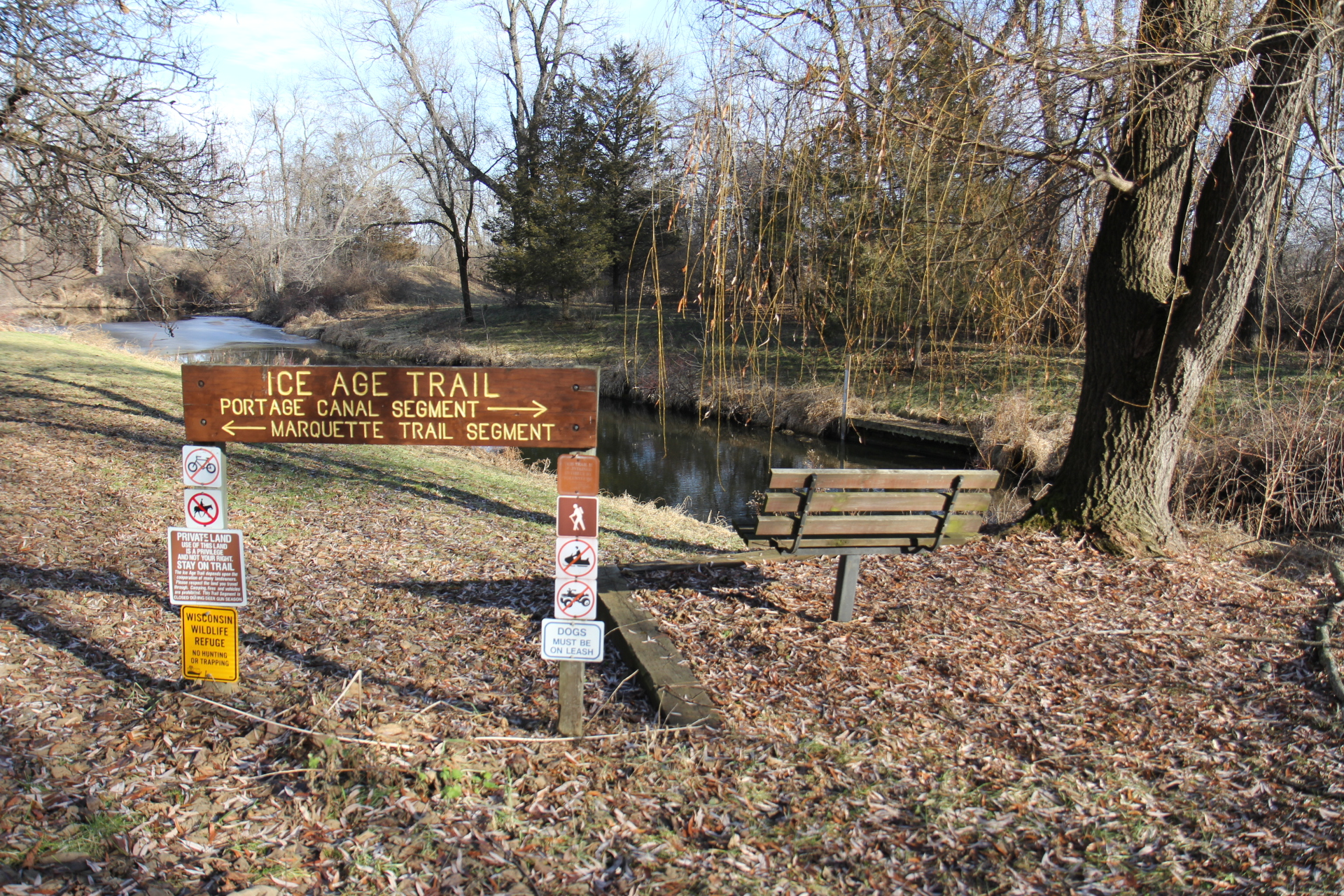
Crossing the Portage Canal

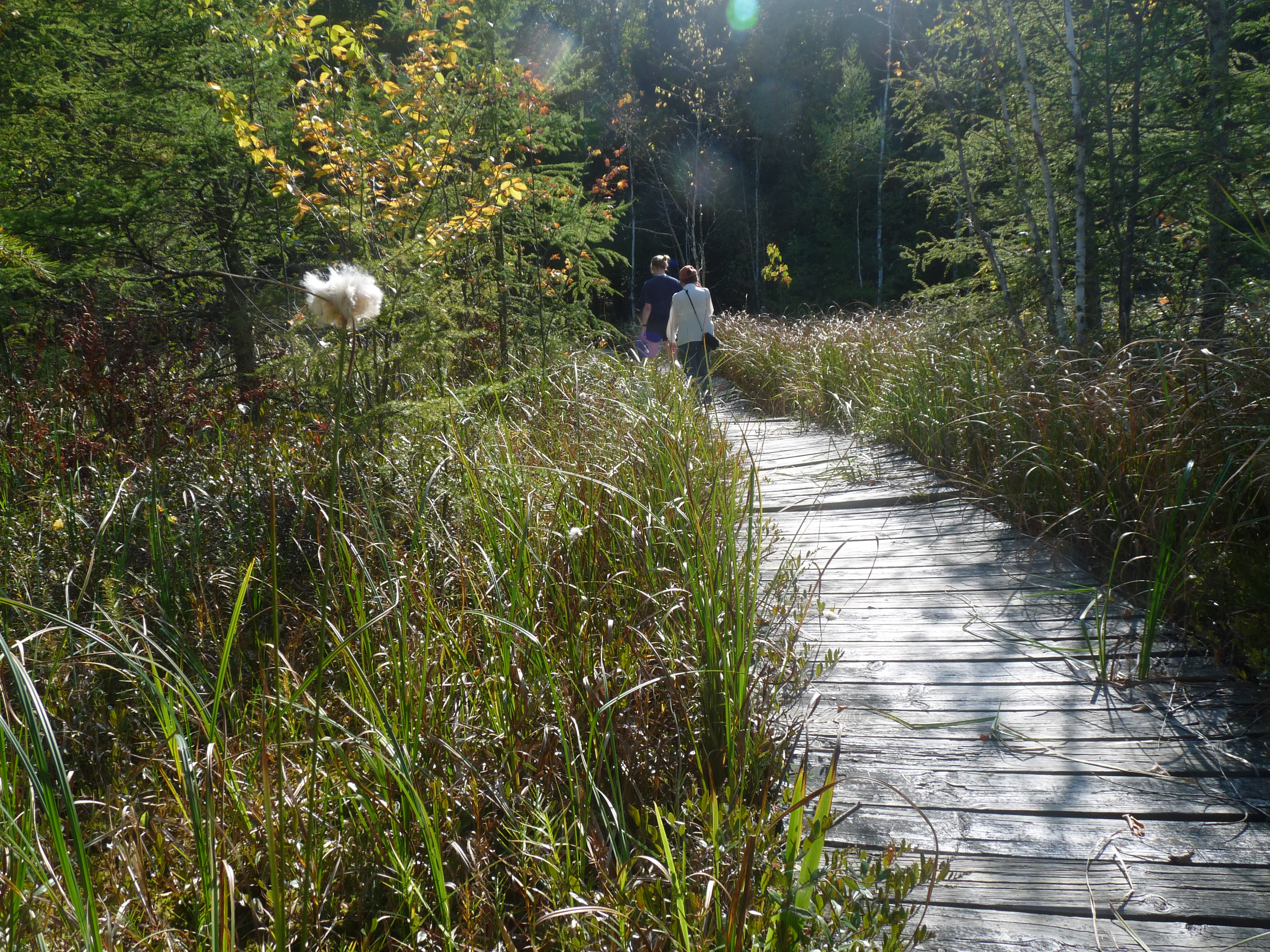
Crossing a bog in the Chequamegon National Forest in Taylor County

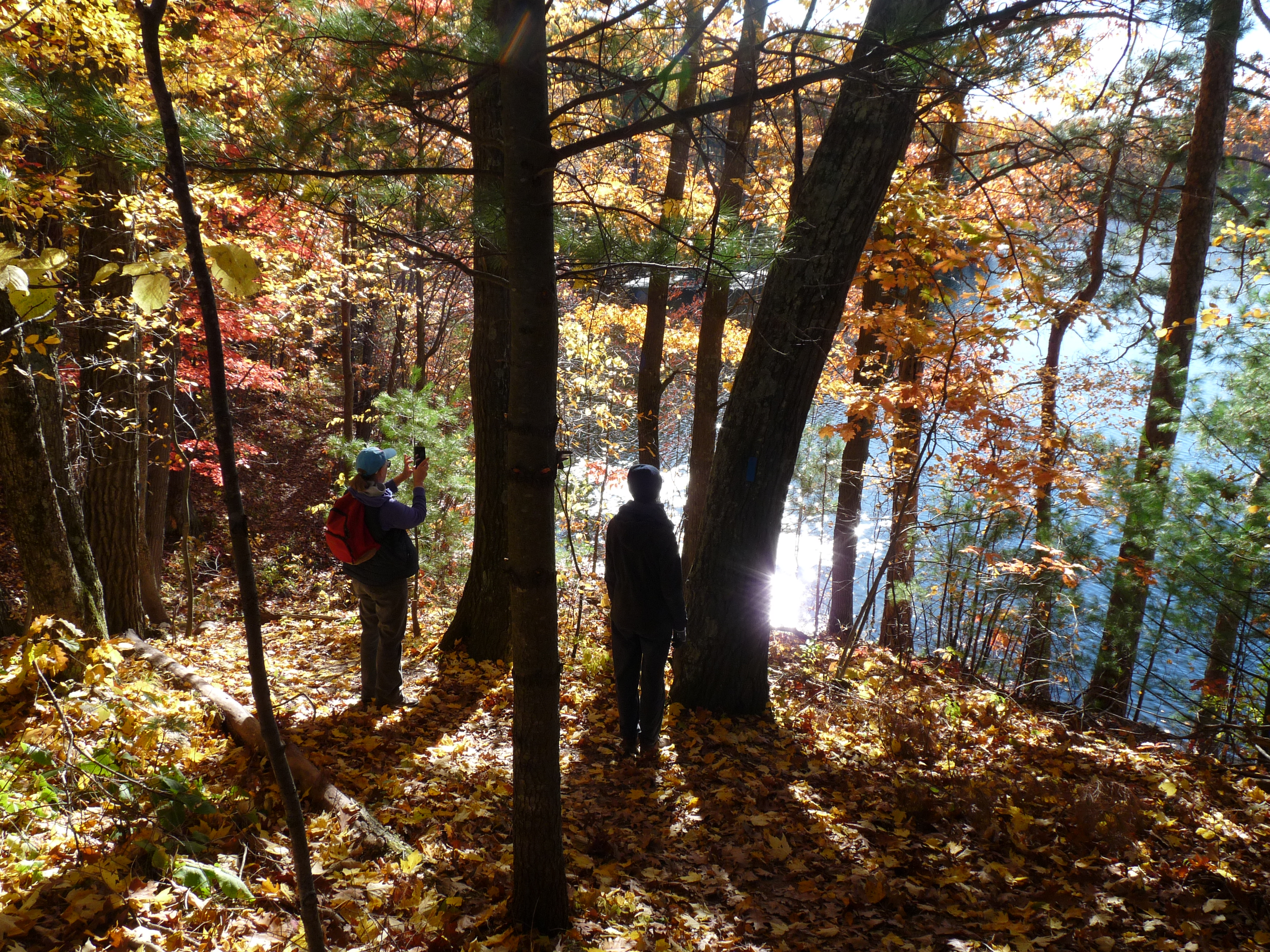
October view of Picnic Lake west of Cornell

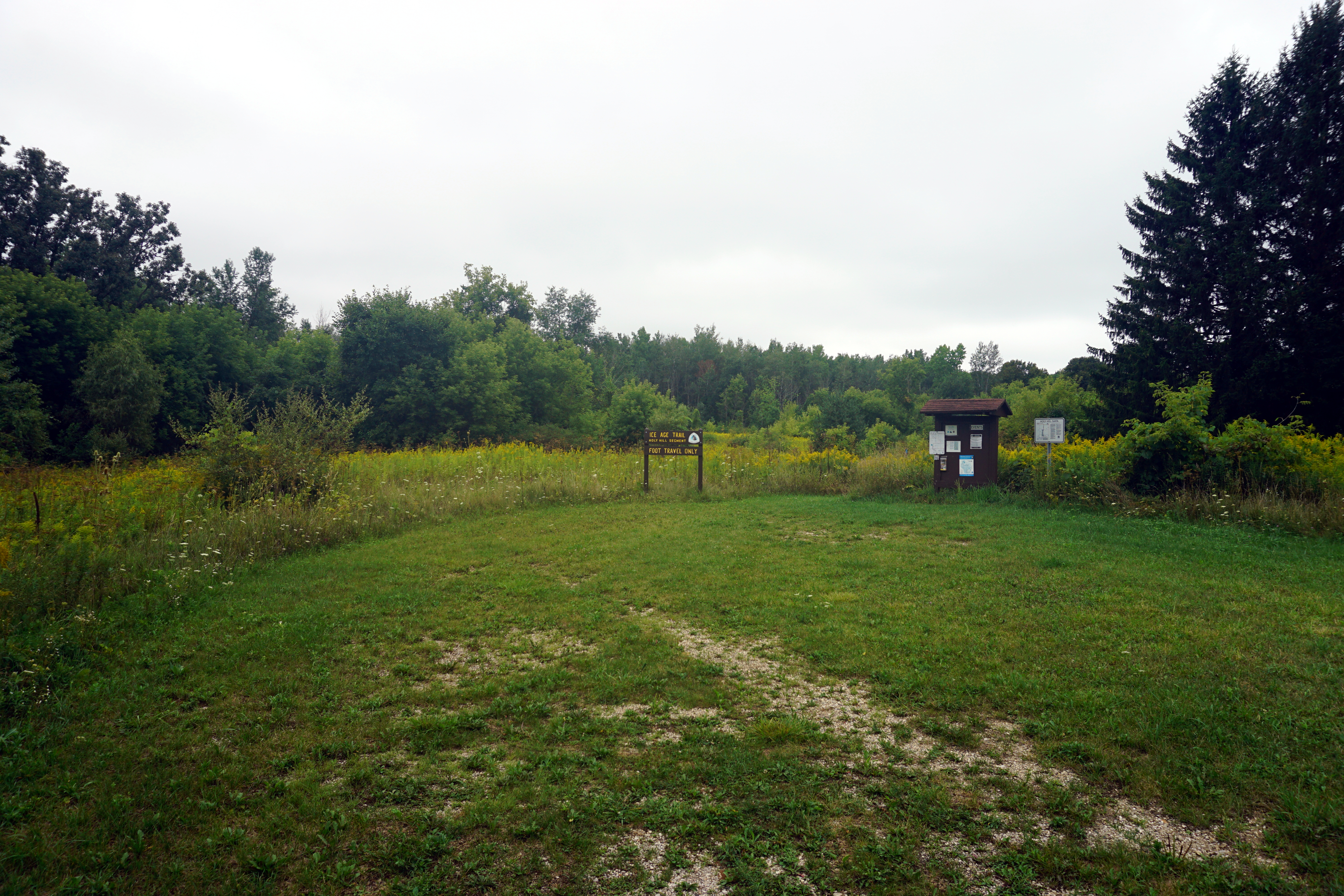
Holy Hill Segment during summer

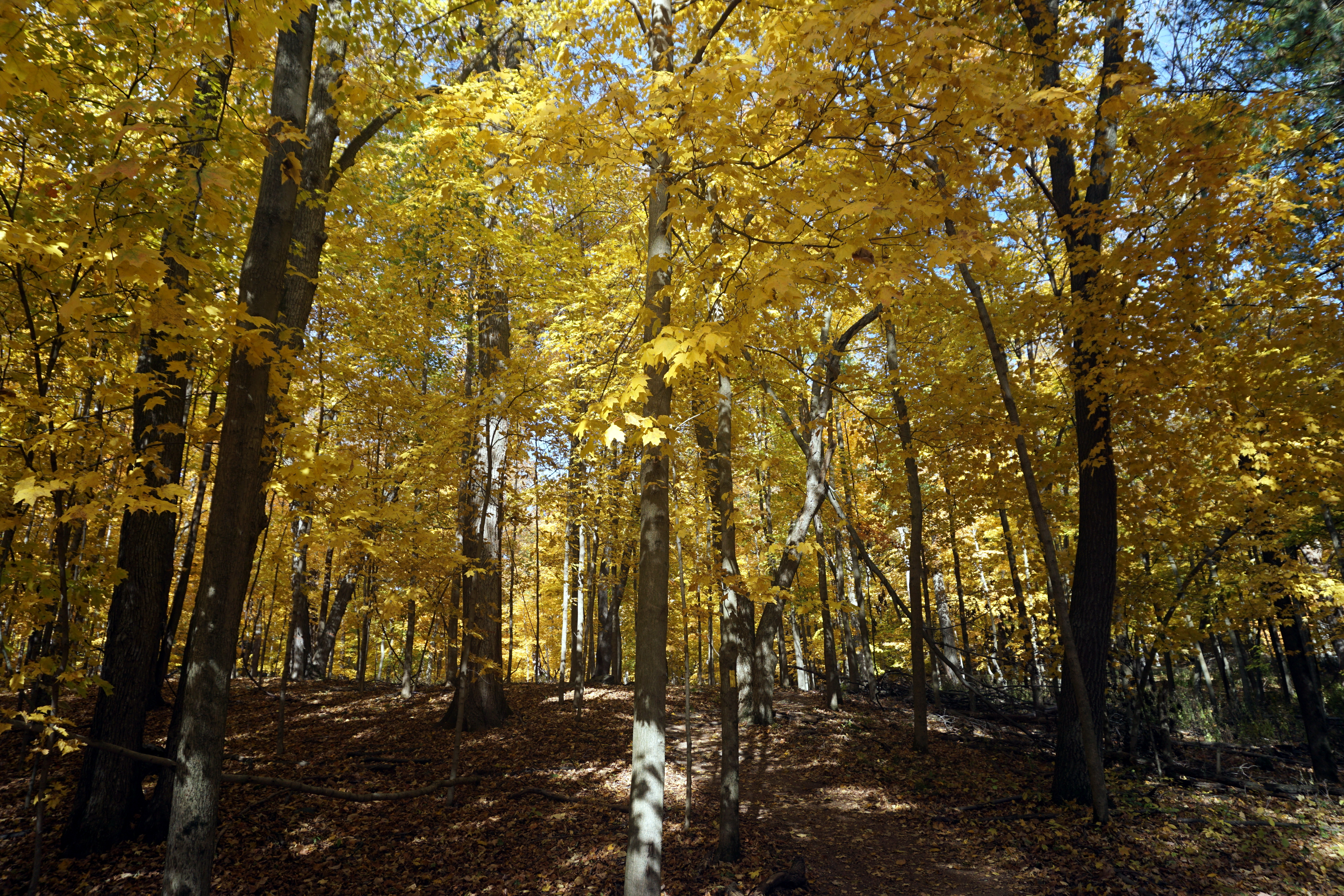
Holy Hill Segment during fall

== See also ==
- Geological Features of Wisconsin
- List of hiking trails in Wisconsin
- Thomas Chrowder Chamberlin, Geology of Wisconsin (1877)
- Ahnapee State Trail, which coincides with the Ice Age Trail in the north

Stages

- Quaternary glaciation
- Illinoian Stage
- Laurentide Ice Sheet
- Pleistocene
- Last glacial period
- Driftless Area

Components

- Interglacial (longer warm period during ice age, such as today)
- Interstadial (brief warm period during ice age, weaker than interglacial)
- Stadial (brief cooler period during interglacial, such as Older Dryas, Younger Dryas, Little Ice Age)
- Little ice age
- Post-glacial rebound
- Timeline of glaciation
- Canadian Shield
- Glacial history of Minnesota
- Lake Agassiz
- Wisconsin glaciation
