= List of proposed national monuments of the United States =

The President of the United States can establish a national monument by presidential proclamation, and the United States Congress can by legislation. The Antiquities Act of 1906 authorized the president to proclaim "historic landmarks, historic and prehistoric structures, and other objects of historic or scientific interest" as national monuments.

Other protective national designations, including those of the National Park Service, must be created by congressional legislation.

== Interior Department memorandum ==
In a 2010 "Not for Release" memorandum by the United States Department of the Interior, 14 areas were listed in the "Prospective Conservation Designation" attachment as "good candidates for National Monument designation under the Antiquities Act". Those areas are included in the lists below, shaded bluish-green.

In subsequent attachments in the same draft, "areas worthy of protection that are ineligible for Monument Designation and unlikely to receive legislative protection in the near term" and "cost estimates" of "high priority land-rationalization efforts" were listed.

== Monuments for All Campaign ==
During the Biden Administration, coalitions of numerous conservation, Native American, and Black groups coalesced to form the Monuments for All campaign, to coincide with the "America the Beautiful" and "30x30" initiatives from the Biden Administration. These groups called on President Biden to designate numerous National Monuments under the Antiquities Act, many from the 2010 Memorandum that were not designated by President Obama. These groups successfully lobbied for the restoration of Bears Ears National Monument and Grand Staircase-Escalante National Monument from President Trump's cuts, as well as Avi Kwa Ame National Monument and Castner Range, Chuckwalla National Monument, and Sáttítla Highlands National Monument, among others. The undesignated monuments covered this campaign are colored blue below.

== Proposed national monuments ==
Proposed name	Photo	Location	Area (Note: Area according to the memorandum if included there, otherwise according to the campaign website or the official area if the national monument has been established meanwhile.)	External information
Bodie Hills		California		
Birthplace of Rivers		West Virginia	122,000 acres (49,000 ha)	BirthplaceofRivers.org; West Virginia Rivers Coalition; Video by Pew & This American Land
Douglas-Fir National Monument		Oregon	530,000 acres (214,500 ha)	Friends of Douglas-Fir National Monument
Expansion of Cascade-Siskiyou (Note: Links to the protected area which will be extended)		California		
Greater Canyonlands	Upper Comb Wash in Greater Canyonlands	Utah; Map; Threats	1,800,000 acres (730,000 ha)	Greater Canyonlands Coalition; Utah Public Lands Initiative with ArcGIS map
Greater Grand Canyon Heritage (The majority of this was designated as part of the Baaj Nwaavjo I'tah Kukveni – Ancestral Footprints of the Grand Canyon National Monument in 2023)		Arizona map	1,700,000 acres (690,000 ha)	Greater Grand Canyon Watershed; Grand Canyon Waters, at the Abyss (New York Times)
Heart of the Great Basin		Nevada		
Lesser Prairie Chicken Preserve		New Mexico	58,000 acres (23,000 ha)	
Montana's Northern Prairie		Montana	2,500,000 acres (1,000,000 ha)	
Northwest Sonoran Desert		Arizona	500,000 acres (200,000 ha)	
Otero Mesa		New Mexico	1,200,000 acres (490,000 ha)	
Owyhee Canyonlands		Oregon	2,100,000 acres (850,000 ha)	Oregon Natural Desert Association
Owyhee Desert		Oregon/Nevada		
Range of Light		California	Approximately 1,427,750 acres	Unite the Parks Range of Light Video featuring Frank Helling as the voice of John Muir
San Rafael Swell		Utah		Utah Public Lands Initiative with ArcGIS map
Sutton Mountain		Oregon	66,000 acres (27,000 ha)	Oregon Natural Desert Association
The Modoc Plateau		California	3,000,000 acres (1,200,000 ha)	Video by Los Angeles Times
Vermillion Basin		Colorado		
Bahsahwahbee National Monument		Nevada		Video by Associated Press
Historic Greenwood/Black Wall Street National Monument		Oklahoma		Black Wall Street Coalition
Great Bend of the Gila National Monument		Arizona; Map	330,000 acres (130,000 ha)	Respect Great Bend
Dolores River Canyon National Monument		Colorado; Map	400,000 acres (160,000 ha)	Protect the Dolores
Kw'tsan National Monument		California	390,000 acres (160,000 ha)	Fort Yuma Quechan Tribe
Mimbres Peaks/Los Lunas National Monument		New Mexico	245,000 acres (99,000 ha)	Protect Mimbres Peaks
National September 11 Memorial and Museum		New York	8 acres (3.2 ha)	

== See also ==
- America's Most Endangered Places
- List of proposed national parks of the United States
- List of threatened historic sites in the United States
- List of national monuments of the United States
- List of national parks of the United States
- List of national memorials of the United States
- List of areas in the United States National Park System
- National Conservation Lands
