= Kettlebowl =

Ski area in Wisconsin, United States

Kettlebowl Ski Area
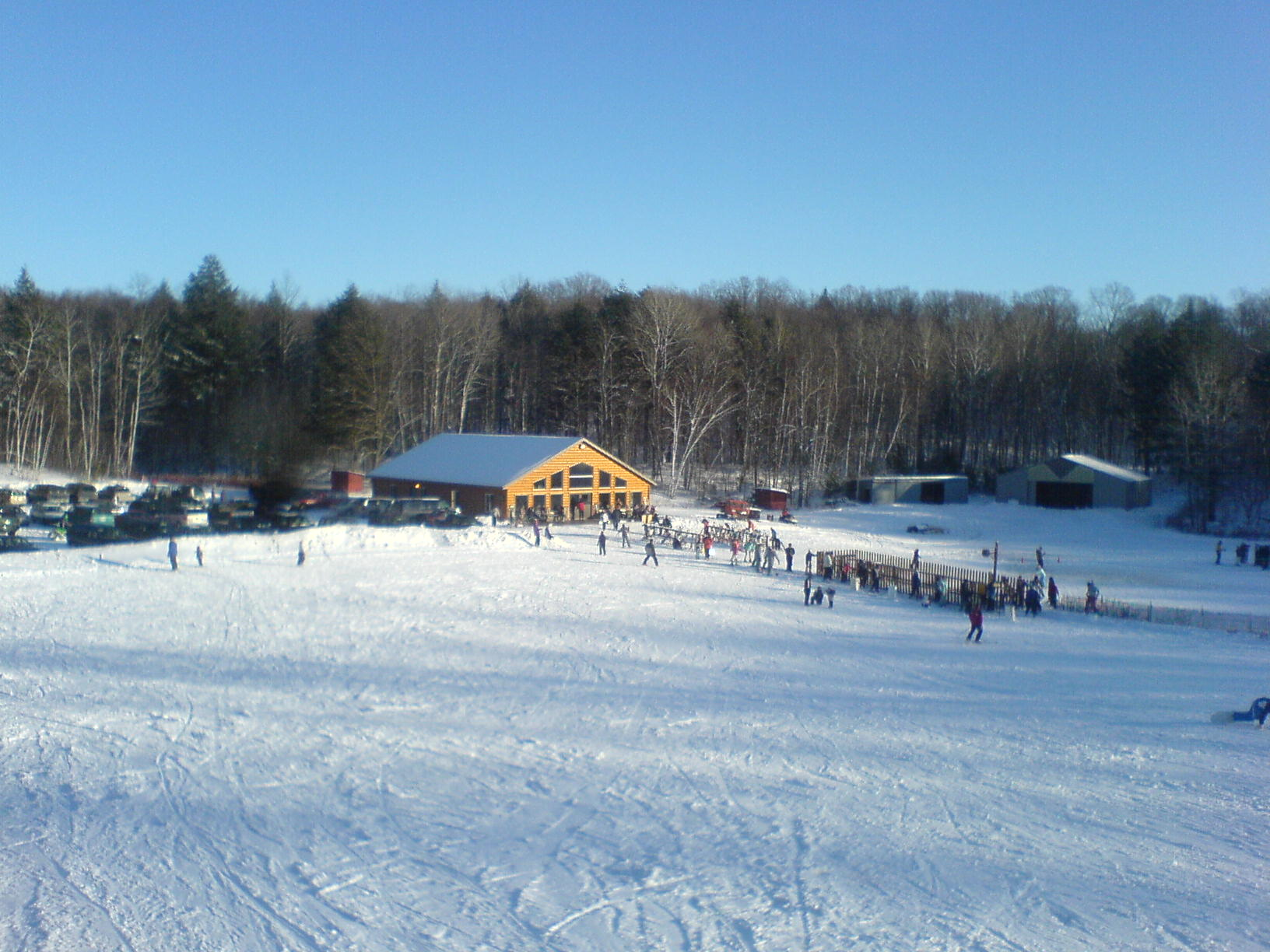
- Interactive map of Kettlebowl Ski Area
- Location: Town of Langlade, Langlade County, Wisconsin, USA
- Nearest city: Antigo, Wisconsin
- Coordinates: 45°16′16.7628″N 88°54′7.1238″W
- Trails: 5 total 80% beginner 20% intermediate
- Lift system: 5 rope tows
- Website: https://kettlebowl.org

Kettlebowl is a small ski area near Bryant, Wisconsin, founded in 1956 and run as a non-profit operation by volunteers of the Langlade County Ski Club.

The name Kettlebowl comes from the Kettle Moraine, a large moraine, or glacial deposit, in Northern Wisconsin. The Ice Age Trail route passes through Kettlebowl.

== History ==
The hill was created in 1956 and was first known as "Kettlehole Bowl". Two tractors donated by the Antigo Cooperative Oil Association powered the tow ropes. Skiers could shelter in a Depression-era lodge hauled to the site that reportedly was a Civilian Conservation Corps structure. In 2005 the old lodge was replaced by a new building with electricity and indoor restrooms.

== Description and location ==
The ski area has cross country ski runs and a small vertical drop (325 ft) and features five rope tows and seven ski runs, including a "bunny" hill. There is a small ski-chalet with indoor bathrooms and a kitchen where volunteers make food and offer it for sale to support the operations of the ski hill. Getting to Kettlebowl is a short ride on Hwy 52 from Antigo, Wisconsin. On weekends when the ski hill is open, a bus service is available to carry local children.

During the 2008–2009 season, 3,881 skiers and snowboarders came through the gates, an average of 185 per day. Cost as of 2012-2013 was $3 for children, and $5 for adults for a day of skiing. The hill is open on Saturdays and Sundays from noon to 4 pm when snow is available.
