= Price, Wisconsin =

- Town
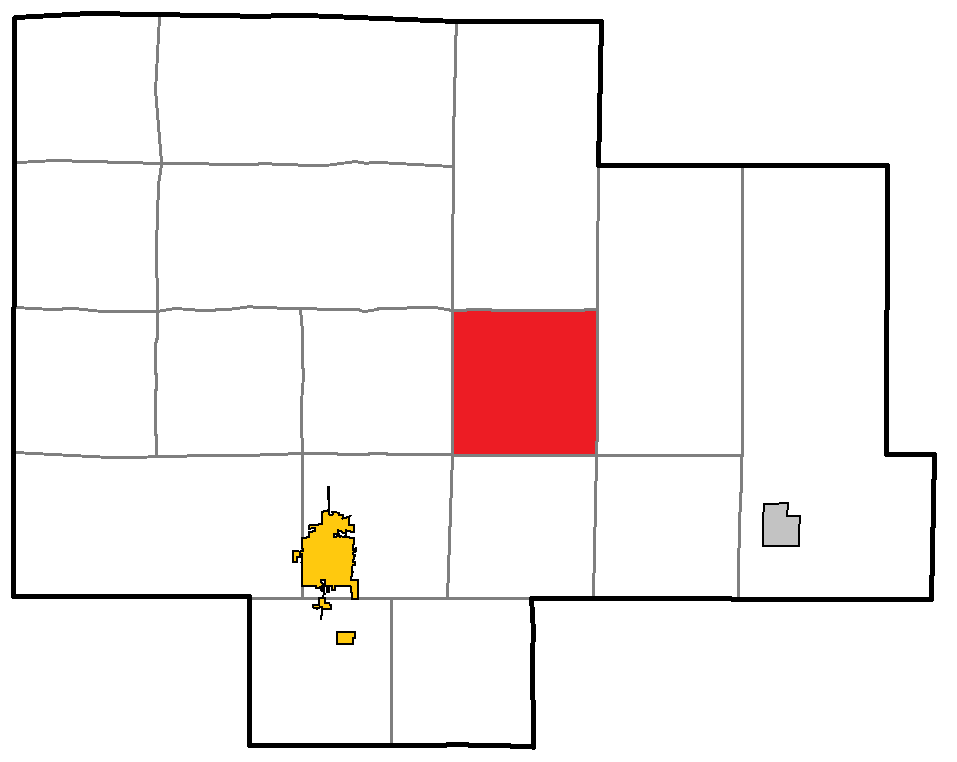
- Location of Price, within Langlade County
- Coordinates: 45°13′33″N 88°59′53″W
- Country: United States
- State: Wisconsin
- County: Langlade

Area
  - Total: 36.3 sq mi (94.1 km^{2})
  - Land: 36.13 sq mi (93.58 km^{2})
  - Water: 0.20 sq mi (0.52 km^{2})
- Elevation: 1,578 ft (481 m)

Population (2020)
  - Total: 221
  - Density: 6.12/sq mi (2.36/km^{2})
- Time zone: UTC-6 (Central (CST))
  - Summer (DST): UTC-5 (CDT)
- ZIP Code: 54418 (Bryant)
- Area codes: 715 & 534
- FIPS code: 55-65550
- GNIS feature ID: 1583984

Price is a town in Langlade County, Wisconsin, United States. The population was 221 at the 2020 census. The unincorporated communities of Bryant and Sherry Junction and the ghost town of Kent are located in the town. The Bryant post office (ZIP Code 54418) covers the entire town.

== Geography ==
Price is in east-central Langlade County, 11 miles (18 km) northeast of Antigo, the county seat. Wisconsin Highway 52 crosses the town, passing through Bryant and Sherry Junction; it leads southwest to Antigo and northeast 10 miles (16 km) to Lily in the town of Langlade.

According to the United States Census Bureau, the town of Price has a total area of 36.3 square miles (94.1 km^{2}), of which 36.1 square miles (93.6 km^{2}) are land and 0.2 square miles (0.5 km^{2}), or 0.55%, are water.

== Demographics ==
As of the census of 2000, there were 243 people, 92 households, and 72 families residing in the town. The population density was 6.7 people per square mile (2.6/km^{2}). There were 101 housing units at an average density of 2.8 per square mile (1.1/km^{2}). The racial makeup of the town was 99.18% White, 0.41% Native American, and 0.41% from two or more races.

There were 92 households, out of which 35.9% had children under the age of 18 living with them, 67.4% were married couples living together, 5.4% had a female householder with no husband present, and 20.7% were non-families. 16.3% of all households were made up of individuals, and 9.8% had someone living alone who was 65 years of age or older. The average household size was 2.64 and the average family size was 2.89.

In the town, the population was spread out, with 26.7% under the age of 18, 4.9% from 18 to 24, 29.2% from 25 to 44, 26.3% from 45 to 64, and 12.8% who were 65 years of age or older. The median age was 39 years. For every 100 females, there were 92.9 males. For every 100 females age 18 and over, there were 95.6 males.

The median income for a household in the town was $53,750, and the median income for a family was $55,833. Males had a median income of $43,500 versus $19,107 for females. The per capita income for the town was $20,338. About 3% of families and 6.5% of the population were below the poverty line, including 10% of those under the age of eighteen and 12.5% of those 65 or over.
