= Ray Zillmer =

American lawyer

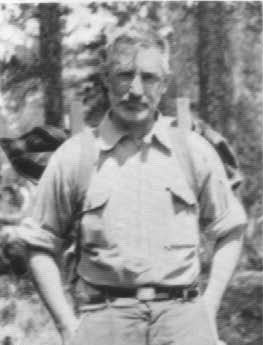
Ray Zillmer

Ray Zillmer (April 19, 1887 – December 13, 1960) was an American attorney, mountaineer and conservationist. He is best known as the founder of the Ice Age Park and Trail Foundation, Inc. (later renamed the Ice Age Trail Alliance) and originator of the Ice Age Trail. He was also instrumental in the conservation of land in the Kettle Moraine of southeast Wisconsin and had an indirect role in the creation of the National Trails System. He died in Milwaukee on December 13, 1960 of heart complications.

== Early life and education ==
Raymond Theodore Zillmer was born in 1887 in Milwaukee, Wisconsin. He was the oldest child of Theodore and Kunigunda Zillmer. His younger siblings were Aimee and Helen. His father was a successful businessman and Milwaukee County Board Supervisor including a term as Chairman of the County Board.

Ray Zillmer graduated from the University of Wisconsin–Madison in 1910, having served for a year as Vice-President of the Commonwealth Club. He attended Harvard Law School in 1910–1911. He earned his PhD from the University of Wisconsin-Madison Law School in 1914, where he taught political science. Published papers associated with his PhD work included:

- "The Significance of the National Bird Law", 1913
- "Uniform Legislation in the United States", 1914
- "State Laws: Survival of the Unfit". Penn Law Review. 1914. Archived from the original on October 8, 2014.

== Career and family ==
He practiced law in Milwaukee from 1914 until his death in 1960. His article, "The Lawyer on the Frontier" was published in the American Law Review in 1916. He married Helen R. Hennessey (b. April 19, 1890) on June 9, 1917. She was a 1913 graduate of Wellesley College. They had two children, John and Jean.

He served in the U.S. Army 1918–1919. From 1938 to 1940, he was president of the City Club of Milwaukee, a civic organization formed to study and promote better social, civic, and economic conditions. He held several leadership positions in the field of law, including:

- 1943-1945—Chairman of the Fee Bill Committee, Milwaukee Bar Association
- 1944-1945—President of the Milwaukee Bar Association
- 1945-1947—Chairman of the Fee Bill Committee of the State Bar Association of Wisconsin

== Exploring and mountaineering ==
During the 1930s-'40s, Zillmer became an accomplished and respected explorer and mountaineer. In July, 1934 Zillmer was part of a team of five mountaineers who completed the first ascent of Anchorite Peak, British Columbia, Canada. He would go on to complete several other first ascents and describe previously uncharted lands. In the summer of 1938, he and Lorin Tiefenthaler retraced the steps of Alexander MacKenzie's 1792-93 expedition between the Fraser and Bella Coola rivers, through part of what is today Tweedsmuir South Provincial Park. He described the adventure in detail in his first of four articles published in the Canadian Alpine Journal.

The American Alpine Journal also published several of his exploration and mountaineering articles, including:

- "The Exploration of the Source of the Thompson River in British Columbia", 1940
- "Exploration of the Northern Monashee Range", 1942
- "The Location of Mt. Milton and the Restoration of the Names 'Mt. Milton' and 'Mt. Cheadle'", 1943
- "The Exploration of the Cariboo Range from the East", 1944
- "The Exploration of the Sources of the McLennan River", 1946

In recognition of his accomplishments, Mount Zillmer, Zillmer Creek and Zillmer Glacier in British Columbia's Cariboo Range were all named in his honor.

== Conservation ==
Ray Zillmer had an important impact on the conservation movement. Without his efforts the Kettle Moraine State Forest would not be as large as it is today and the Ice Age Trail would not exist. His insistence that long, narrow corridors of public land serve greater numbers of outdoor recreationists and proposal for a long-distance hiking trail in Wisconsin made an impression on Wisconsin Governor Gaylord Nelson. Armed with this appreciation and later as a U.S. Senator, Nelson introduced legislation to designate the Appalachian Trail America's first national trail and introduced the National Trails System Act of 1968.

From 1941 to 1949, Zillmer was Chairman of the Kettle Moraine Committee of the Izaak Walton League of Milwaukee. From 1954 to 1958, he was Chairman of the Kettle Moraine Committee of the Wisconsin Izaak Walton League. In July, 1958 he established the Ice Age National Park Citizens Committee. On December 8, 1958 he founded the Ice Age Park and Trail Foundation, later renamed the Ice Age Trail Alliance. His articles proposing an Ice Age National Park in Wisconsin were published in 1958 by the Milwaukee Public Museum and in 1959 by the Wisconsin Alumnus magazine.

In 1933 the Wisconsin Izaak Walton League named Zillmer "Man of the Year" for his work on the Kettle Moraine State Forest. In 1959 he was presented a plaque by the National Campers and Hikers Association for his efforts to preserve natural areas for public use. A trail system in the Northern Kettle Moraine State Forest is named the Zillmer Trails and a park in St. Croix Falls, Wisconsin is named Ray Zillmer Park, both in his honor. He was inducted into the Wisconsin Conservation Hall of Fame in 1993. Today the highest award of achievement given by the Ice Age Trail Alliance is the Ray Zillmer Award.

Following his death in December, 1960 the Milwaukee Journal opined, "...the people of Milwaukee and of Wisconsin and the conservation movement nationally are deeply indebted to Mr. Zillmer. His vision, his boundless energy and his dogged determination in behalf of worthy causes to which he was devoted became legend . . . No community and no state ever has enough of men like Raymond T. Zillmer. And the loss of even one, inevitable as it may be, is cause for deep regret."
