= Bryant, Wisconsin =

- Unincorporated community
- Location within Wisconsin Location within the United States
- Coordinates: 45°12′29″N 89°01′26″W
- Country: United States
- State: Wisconsin
- County: Langlade
- Town: Price
- Elevation: 1,588 ft (484 m)
- Time zone: UTC-6 (Central (CST))
  - Summer (DST): UTC-5 (CDT)
- ZIP code: 54418
- Area codes: 715 & 534
- GNIS feature ID: 1562315

Bryant is an unincorporated community located in Langlade County, Wisconsin, United States. Bryant is located on Wisconsin Highway 52 northeast of Antigo, in the town of Price. Bryant had a post office, which closed on August 16, 1997.

Bryant was named for Sherburn M. Bryant, the original owner of land surrounding the town site.

== Recreation ==
- Kettlebowl Ski Area is located near the community.
