= Kettle Moraine Scenic Drive =

Highway in Wisconsin, United States

Kettle Moraine Scenic Drive
- Kettle Moraine Scenic Drive highlighted in green

Route information
- Length: 115 mi (185 km)

Major junctions
- South end: Jct State Park Rd and Kettle Moraine Rd near Whitewater
- North end: CTH-P / CTH-J near Elkhart Lake

Location
- Country: United States
- State: Wisconsin

Highway system
- Wisconsin State Trunk Highway System; Interstate; US; State; Scenic; Rustic

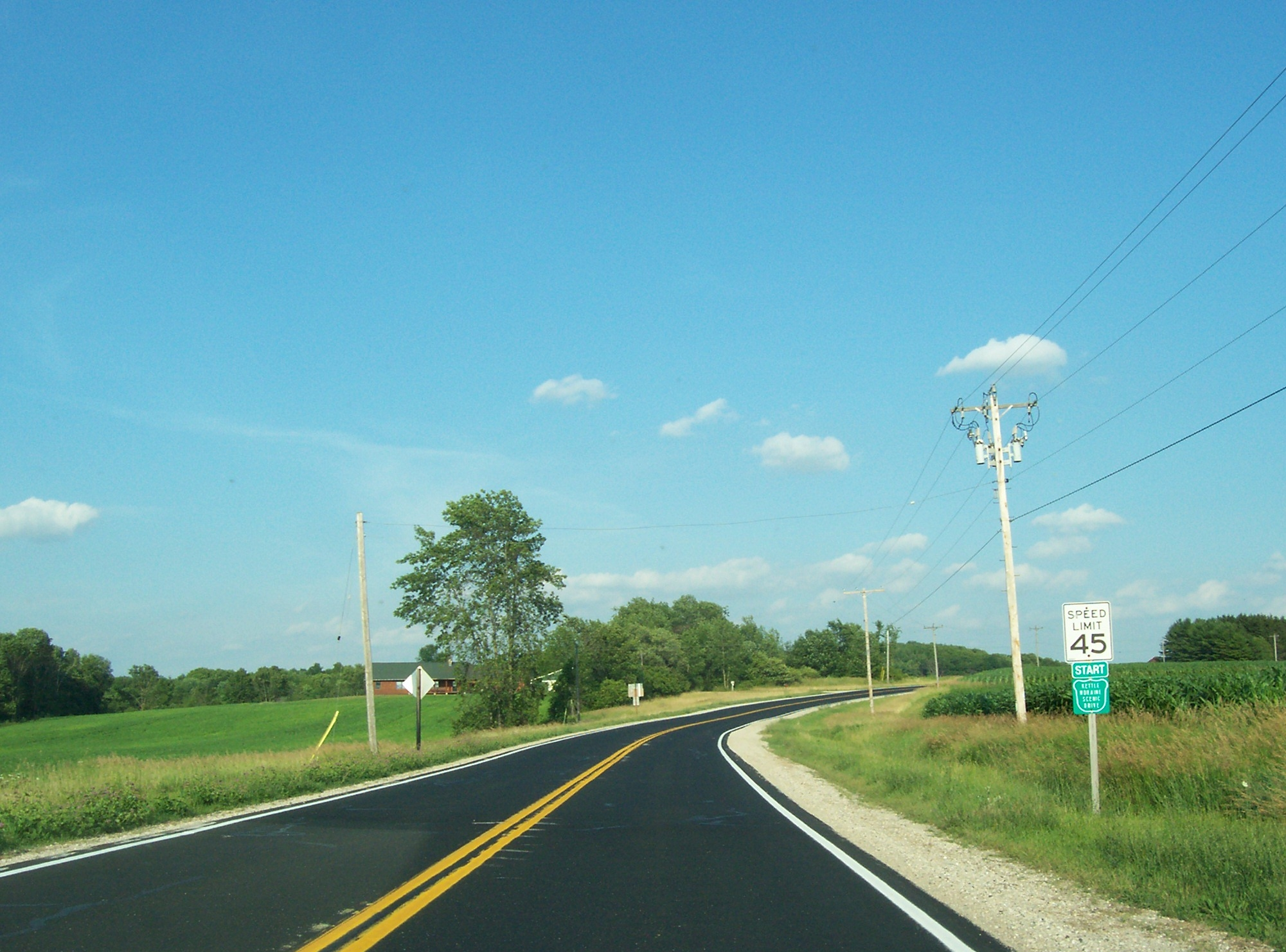
Northern terminus

The Kettle Moraine Scenic Drive is a designated scenic route in southeastern Wisconsin that links the two units of the Kettle Moraine State Forest. The route traverses through scenic and historic areas, including landscape shaped by glaciers from the latest ice age, known as the Wisconsin glaciation.

== Route description ==
Kettle Moraine Scenic Drive generally follows county and local roads. It begins near Whitewater – at the southern expanse of the Kettle Moraine State Forest's southern unit (42°45′56″N 88°42′18″W), the drive takes a northeast trek and passes through six counties: Walworth, Jefferson, Waukesha, Washington, Fond du Lac, and Sheboygan. The route's northern terminus is near Sheboygan County Broughton Marsh Park northwest of Elkhart Lake (43°50′53″N 88°02′29″W).

== History ==
The idea of a route along the Kettle Moraine was believed to be conceived in the early 1940s by the Kettle Moraine Committee of the Izaak Walton League – Milwaukee Chapter, which was the backbone behind the development of the Kettle Moraine State Forest units. The first surveying of the area did not begin until 1946. The Wisconsin Highway Commission approved the route in 1948 and the first paving project was completed in 1950.

== Attractions along the drive ==
The drive passes by various opportunities for recreation and tourism in the Kettle Moraine area. Access is provided to sightseeing, hiking, biking, camping, cross-country skiing and fishing facilities.

The following state parks and forests are accessible via the scenic drive – from south to north:

- Kettle Moraine – Southern Unit
- Glacial Drumlin State Trail
- Kettle Moraine – Lapham Peak Unit
- Kettle Moraine – Pike Lake Unit
- Kettle Moraine – Northern Unit

The following historical sites are accessible via the scenic drive – from south to north:

- Old World Wisconsin in Eagle
- Holy Hill near Hubertus
- Sylvanus Wade House in Greenbush
- Parnell Tower, an observation tower near Parnell
- The north terminus and the northernmost several miles of pavement was part of the original track circuit for Road America in 1950. The corner at the north terminus was called the "Marsh Turn", and it is marked with a historical marker. There is also a historical marker along the Kettle Moraine Scenic Drive in the city of Elkhart Lake marking the site of the 1951 and 1952 start/finish line.

== Gallery ==
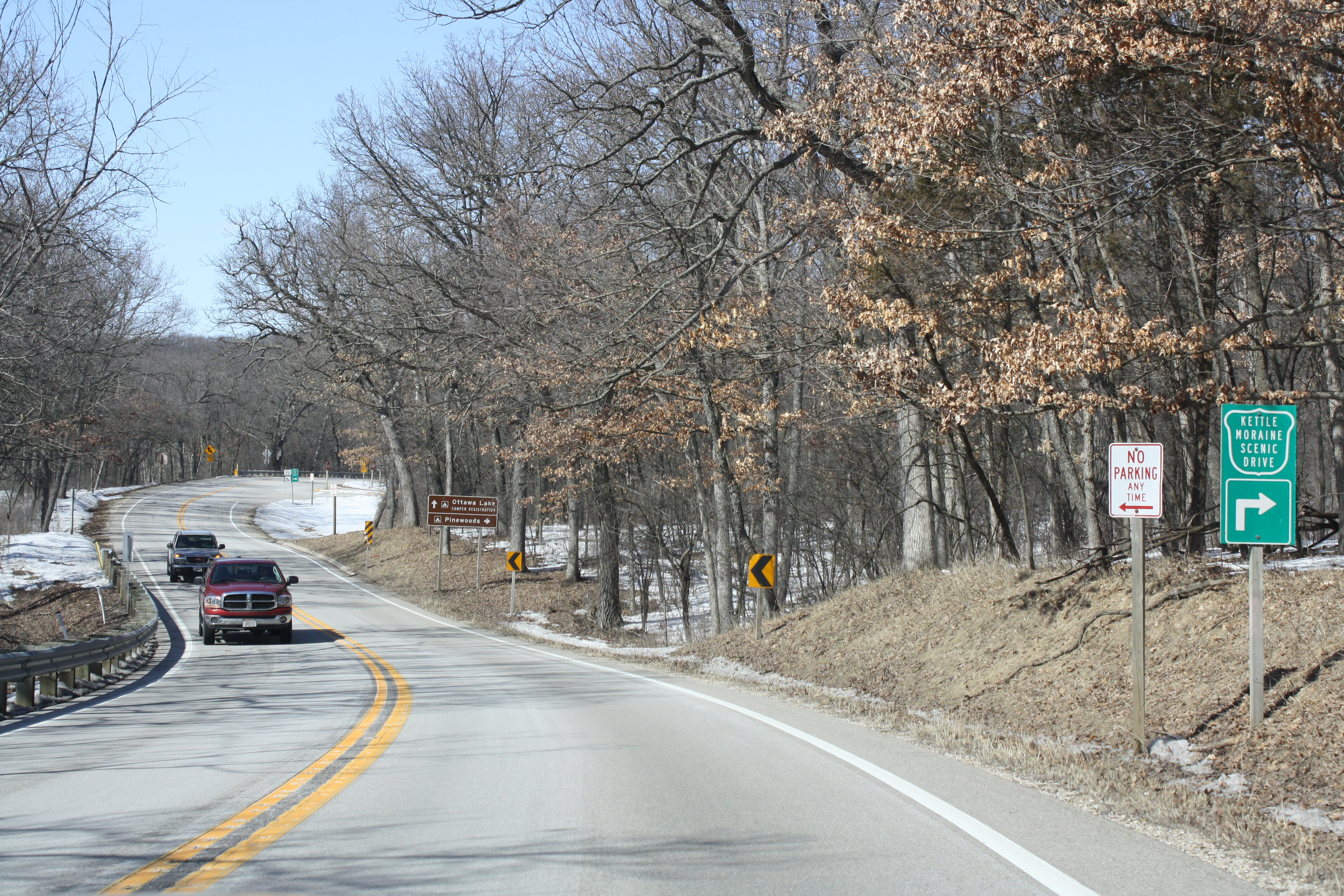
March 2013 on the Kettle Moraine Scenic Drive in the Southern Unit

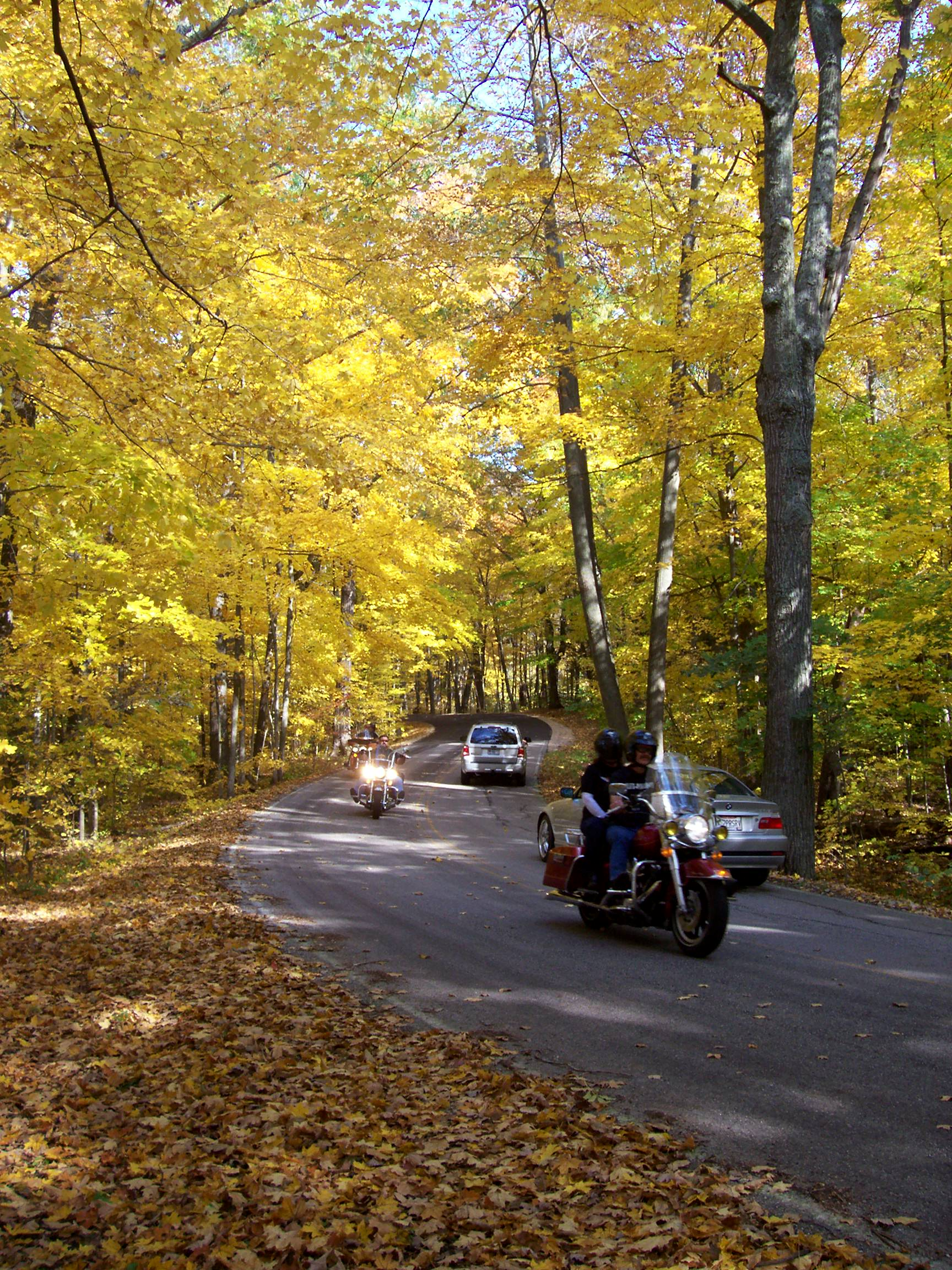
Busy traffic in fall

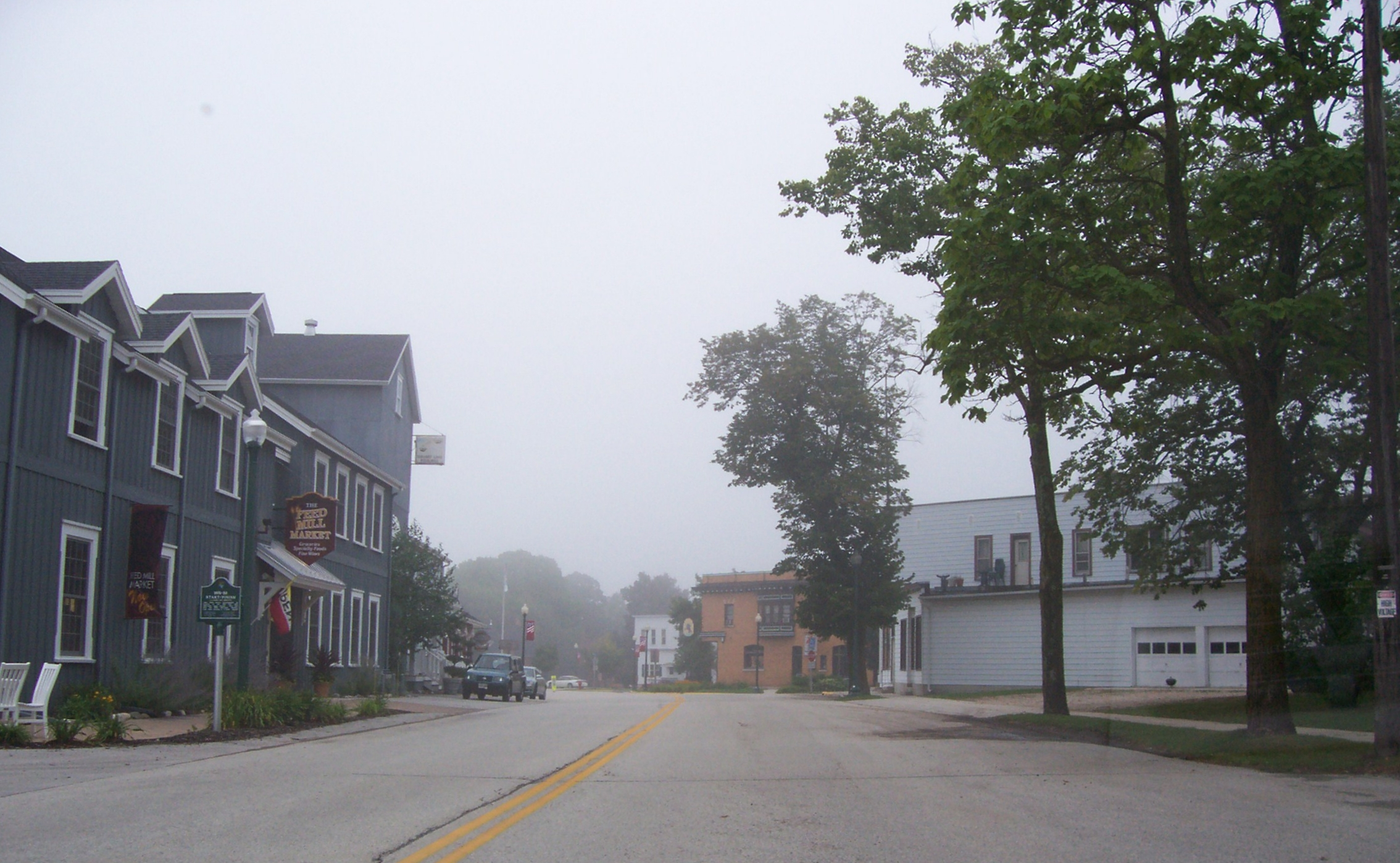
1951/1952 start/finish line for Elkhart Lake race

== Major intersections ==
County	Location	mi	km	Destinations	Notes
Walworth	Town of Whitewater			R and W Townline Road	
Walworth	Town of Whitewater			CTH-P	
Walworth	Town of La Grange			CTH-O	
Walworth	Town of La Grange			CTH-H	Southern end of CTH-H overlap
Walworth	Community of La Grange			US 12	
Jefferson	Palmyra			WIS 59 west	Western end of WIS 59 overlap
Jefferson	Palmyra			CTH-E	
Jefferson	Town of Palmyra			CTH-H	Northern end of CTH-H overlap
Jefferson–Waukesha county line	Palmyra–Eagle town line			CTH-Z	
