= Old World Wisconsin =

Open-air museum in Waukesha County, Wisconsin

- IUCN category V (protected landscape/seascape)
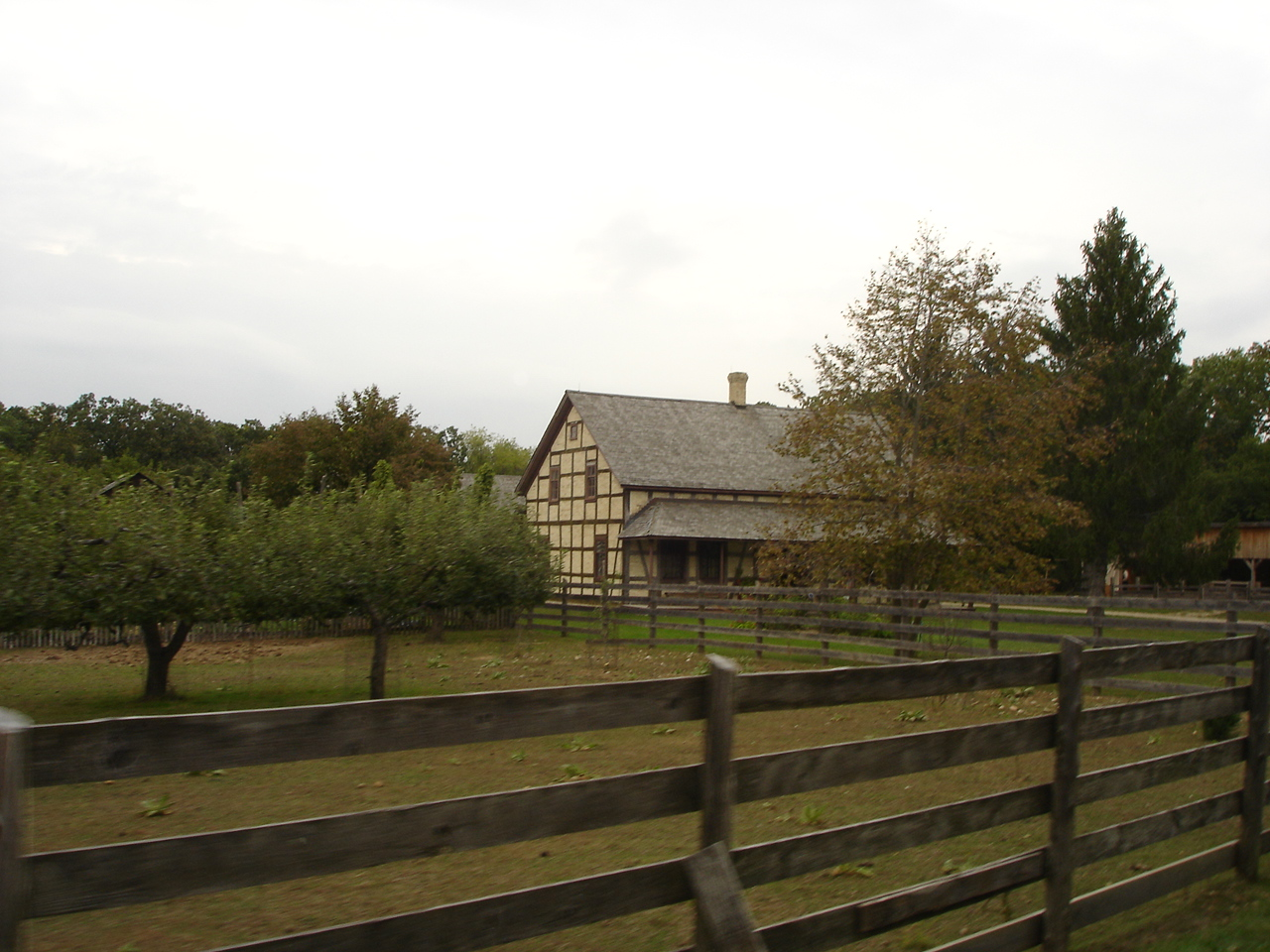
- Koepsel House at Old World Wisconsin

- Location within Wisconsin Location within the United States
- Location: Eagle, Wisconsin, United States
- Coordinates: 42°51′50″N 88°29′16″W
- Area: 480 acres (190 ha)
- Established: 1976
- Governing body: Wisconsin Historical Society
- Website: oldworldwisconsin.wisconsinhistory.org

Old World Wisconsin is an open-air museum located near Eagle, in Waukesha County, Wisconsin, United States. It depicts housing and the daily life of settlers in 19th-century Wisconsin, with separate areas representing the traditions of different ethnic groups who settled in the state. Costumed interpreters portray the occupations and chores of typical settlers of the time.

== Overview ==
Opened in 1976, the museum is owned and operated by the Wisconsin Historical Society. The largest outdoor museum of rural life in the United States, it encompasses approximately 480 acres (2.4 km^{2}) of rolling wooded hills. It is adjacent to the Kettle Moraine State Forest South Unit. It contains more than 60 historic structures, ranging from ethnic farmsteads with furnished houses and rural outbuildings to an 1880s crossroads village with traditional small town institutions. Additional structures at the Welcome Center offer guest amenities and experiences, such as the historically inspired Brewhouse and historic Wittnebel's Tavern, which demonstrates historic brewing and offers samples of the daily brew. An event space is located in the octagonal Clausing Barn. Guests are also able to purchase a selection of lunch options, snacks, sweets and frozen custard in the Crossroads Village at the Creamery building. Trams run between the Scandinavian Homesteads, Life on the Farms, Crossroads Village, and Welcome Center areas.

In 2026, construction was completed on a new 10,000-square-foot Welcome Center, with expanded gift shop and restroom areas moved from Ramsey Barn. Guests are able to purchase souvenirs, books on Wisconsin and 19th century history, crafts, and items produced on site, such as yarn made from Old World Wisconsin sheep.

== History ==
Old World Wisconsin exists largely due to the efforts of German immigrant Hans Kuether and architect Richard W. E. Perrin. Perrin was an early advocate for the preservation of historic structures as evidenced by his involvement with the Association for the Preservation of Historic Buildings and with the preservation of the Mitchell-Rountree House in Platteville, Wisconsin in 1959. Perrin published a guide book in 1960 titled Historic Wisconsin Architecture listing 76 structures in Wisconsin that he felt were worthy of preservation. Perrin first proposed the idea for an outdoor museum in 1964 in the form of a "Pioneer Park". Perrin's inspiration for the park actually dated back to a trip he made to Europe in 1953 and visited European outdoor museums including Skansen in Sweden which he used as his model for the Wisconsin Park.

The effort to actually create the museum began in 1966, when the University of Wisconsin Department of Landscape Architucture and the Wisconsin Historical Society, agreed to have an undergraduate class at the university prepare preliminary plans for an outdoor museum. The proposals created were published in a report titled "Heritage Village, Wisconsin – A Preliminary Proposal". Following this, two graduate students were selected to refine and expand the preliminary programs through research, on-site investigations and design studies and create a master plan for development. The study was co-funded by the College of Agricultural and Life Sciences and the State Historical Society at a cost of under $5,000. In 1968, the master plan was summarized in a 122-page report which also included an economic feasibility study by a graduate student in the School of Business. The project was named Old World Wisconsin and the Heritage wording was later applied to the Heritage Hill State Historical Park near Green Bay, Wisconsin.

Fundraising for purchase of property estimated at $30,000 were begun in January 1969. In June 1971 it was announced that the Wisconsin Department of Natural Resources would transfer about 560 acres of property that was then part of the Kettle Moraine State Forest to the State Historical Society for the museum. Development costs were estimated at $1.5 million at that time with about 20% of that coming from private donors.

Development of the park was intended to start in 1972 and the Historical Society had already moved 11 dismantled structures to the site but work was delayed until 1973 pending completion of an environmental impact study. A dispute arose in 1973 with the Town of Eagle. The residents of the town were concerned about the impact the environmental impact statement revealed that the development of the museum would have on their town and the town board became concerned over lack of control by local zoning and building permits. The board had directed the town's building inspector to post a stop-work order at the site. The state filed a suit to vacate the order and $50,000 damages. The town countersued for $5,000,000 claiming that newly passed state law required the state to follow local zoning ordinances. The court lifted the order stating that work had started at the site before the law took effect on August 1 and was therefore exempt from the new rule. The town did not give up on their lawsuit until November 1974.

The park was dedicated on June 8, 1974, with a flag-raising ceremony. At the time there were 8 structures completed or under construction.

In May 1975, the society reported that construction was still on schedule but that estimated costs had risen from $2.3 million to $4.5 million but that donations had only produced about $1 million.

In December 1975 Wisconsin Governor Patrick Lucey announced that a $4 million fund raising campaign would be chaired by Herbert Kohler Jr. and his wife Linda. The Kohler family already had a 45-year history of historic building construction and restoration through the Kohler Foundation dating back to the 1931 construction of the Waelderhaus and the 1950s restoration of the Sylvanus Wade House.

The queen of Denmark, Margrethe II dedicated the Danish exhibit on May 14, 1976.

The museum officially opened on June 30, 1976, in time for the United States Bicentennial celebration.

=== Tornado damage ===
On the evening of June 21, 2010, the museum was hit by a tornado that leveled acres of trees on the grounds. The "Old World 4th of July" event was canceled because of the clean-up efforts.

== Villages ==
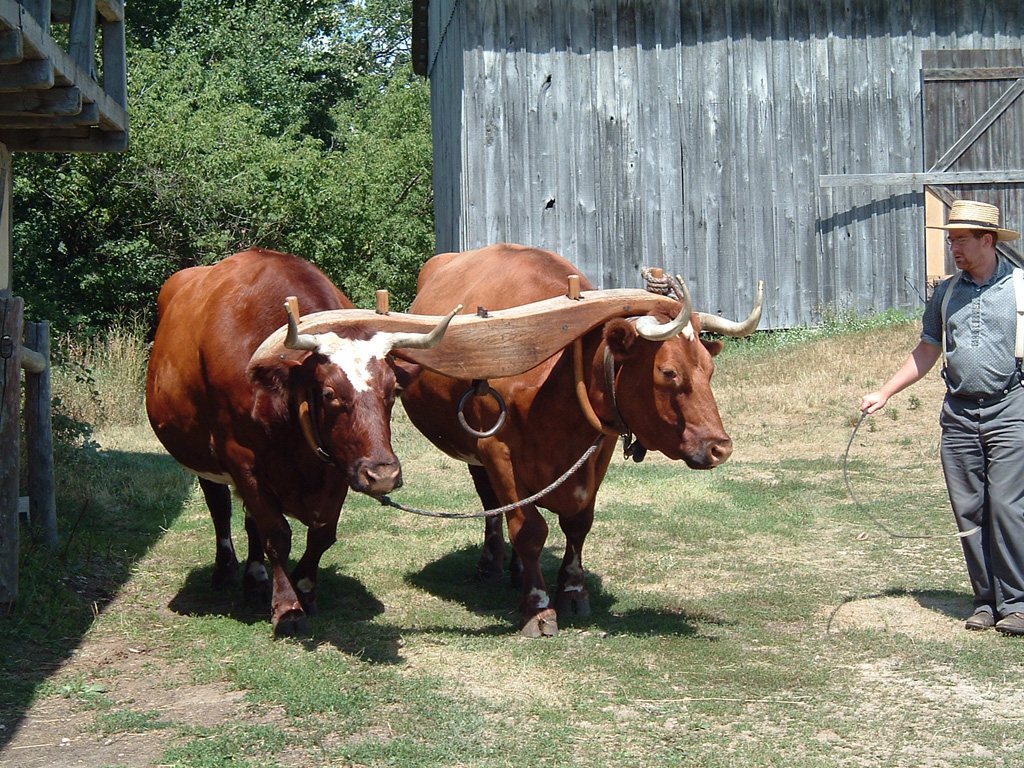
Live Interpreter with oxen

The park is divided into themed areas that represent typical settlement from various immigrant cultures.

- African American: Pleasant Ridge Cemetery Chapel, Shepard Family Cemetery, United Brethren Church, Pleasant Ridge Cemetery
- Danish: Pedersen Farm
- Finnish: Rankinen Farm, Ketola Farm
- German: Koepsel Farm, Schottler Farm, Schulz Farm
  - Christian Turck House was originally known as Schottler Farm. Both the Koepsel House and Christian Turck House are listed on the National Register of Historic Places. .
- Norwegian: Fossebrekke Farm, Kvaale Farm, Raspberry School
- Polish: Kruza House
- Yankee/1880s Village: Harmony Town Hall, Four Mile Inn, Sisel Shoe Shop, Benson House, Grotelueschen Blacksmith Shop, Peterson Wagon Shop, Thomas General Store, Mary Hafford House, St. Peter's Church and a new exhibit added in 2014, Catch Wheel Fever
  - Yankee Village also contains non-Yankee buildings featuring the integration of other European settlers to Wisconsin in the 19th century:
    - Sisel shoe shop (Czech)
    - Grotelueschen Blacksmith Shop (German)
    - Peterson Wagon Shop (Scandinavian)

== List of structures ==
Three of the site's structures are listed on the National Register of Historic Places. Buildings were relocated from locations throughout Wisconsin.

Structure name	Village	location	Image	Built	Construction/style/notes
Wheelman's Club Bicycle Shop	The Green	42.870732°N 88.489350°W			
Caldwell Hall Education Center	The Green	42.870523°N 88.489429°W			
Clausing Barn/Gift Shop	The Green	42.872608°N 88.490737°W			
Pergola	The Green	42.871920°N 88.490589°W		2016	
Ramsey Barn	The Green	42.871382°N 88.490823°W			
Shelter	The Green	42.871668°N 88.490589°W			
Guest Services/Family History Center	The Green	42.872080°N 88.490572°W			
United Brethren Church	African-American	42.867242°N 88.496876°W			
Pleasant Ridge Chapel	African-American	42.867566°N 88.495333°W			
Pleasant Ridge Cemetery	African-American	42.867548°N 88.496626°W			
Shepard Family Cemetery	African-American	42.867677°N 88.495414°W			
Pedersen House	Danish	42.861953°N 88.490058°W		1872	moved from Polk County
Pedersen Barn	Danish	42.861824°N 88.490488°W		early 1870s	moved from Polk County
Ketola Barn	Finnish	42.865568°N 88.491266°W			Moved from Oulu, Bayfield County
Ketola House	Finnish	42.865278°N 88.491531°W			Log Moved from Oulu, Bayfield County
Lantta Hay Barn (Ketola Farm)	Finnish	42.864850°N 88.491474°W			
Ronkainen Sauna (Ketola Farm)	Finnish	42.865137°N 88.491223°W			
Kortesmaa Granary (Ketola Farm)	Finnish	42.865292°N 88.491181°W			
Makela Stable (Ketola Farm)	Finnish	42.865456°N 88.491179°W			
Rankinen Outhouse (Ketola Farm)	Finnish	42.865536°N 88.491135°W			
Rankinen House	Finnish	42.865910°N 88.490011°W			
Rankinen Barn	Finnish	42.865651°N 88.490219°W			
Kortesmaa Outhouse (Rankinen Farm)	Finnish	42.865583°N 88.490195°W			
Koepsel House	German	42.866347°N 88.497387°W		1860	Listed on the NRHP in 1973 (#73000095)
Barn (Koepsel Farm)	German	42.866163°N 88.497776°W			
Brewing Shed (Koepsel Farm)	German	42.866807°N 88.498581°W			
Outhouse (Koepsel Farm)	German	42.866094°N 88.497472°W			
Stable (Koepsel Farm)	German	42.866345°N 88.497924°W		1850	Astylistic Utilitarian. Moved to Old World Wisconsin from town of Emmet, Dodge County, west side of County Road EM, 1.1 miles north of State Road 109
Hog pen (Koepsel Farm)	German	42.866631°N 88.497474°W			
Wood Shop (Koepsel Farm)	German	42.866472°N 88.497788°W			
Schultz House	German	42.864978°N 88.497693°W			
Schultz Barn	German	42.865447°N 88.497717°W			
Schultz Stable	German	42.865244°N 88.497901°W			
Schottler House	German	42.865566°N 88.499292°W		1846	Cedar log house chinked with rye straw and clay, built in Washington County. Listed on the NRHP in 1973 (#73000097) as Christian Turck House
Held Barn (Schottler farm)	German	42.865435°N 88.499535°W			
Jung Barn (Schottler farm)	German	42.865289°N 88.499378°W			
Fassbender Granary (Schottler farm)	German	42.865295°N 88.499144°W			
Kessel Bakehouse (Schottler farm)	German	42.865421°N 88.499217°W			
Jung Smokehouse (Schottler farm)	German	42.865516°N 88.499087°W			
Abandoned House	Norwegian	42.858767°N 88.490477°W			
Abandoned Barn	Norwegian	42.858536°N 88.490749°W			
Kvaale House	Norwegian	42.858800°N 88.493865°W			
Dahlen Corncrib (Kvaale Farm)	Norwegian	42.858938°N 88.494161°W			
Sorbergshagen Barn (Kvaale Farm)	Norwegian	42.858925°N 88.494453°W			
Lisbakken Granery (Kvaale Farm)	Norwegian	42.858707°N 88.494485°W			
Bosboen Barn (Kvaale Farm)	Norwegian	42.858528°N 88.494209°W			
Otteson Outhouse (Kvaale Farm)	Norwegian	42.858627°N 88.493951°W			
Veggli House (Kvaale Farm)	Norwegian	42.858607°N 88.493803°W			
Fossebrekke House	Norwegian	42.859347°N 88.493674°W		1845 (second-oldest building on site)	
Raspberry Schoolhouse	Norwegian	42.859044°N 88.492403°W			
Ward District Schoolhouse No. 3	Norwegian	42.857570°N 88.493729°W		1849	Greek Revival, Listed on the NRHP in 1981 (#81000066)
Kruza House	Polish	42.864375°N 88.499057°W			
Kaczorowski Outhouse	Polish	42.864283°N 88.498937°W			
Roadside Cross	Polish	42.864729°N 88.498945°W			
Benson House	Yankee/1880s Village	42.868348°N 88.491758°W			
Benson Barn	Yankee/1880s Village	42.868393°N 88.492228°W			
Benson Gezebo	Yankee/1880s Village	42.868322°N 88.492029°W			
Blacksmith Shop	Yankee/1880s Village	42.868508°N 88.491727°W			
Hafford House	Yankee/1880s Village	42.869225°N 88.492237°W			
Four Mile House	Yankee/1880s Village	42.867983°N 88.491581°W			
Harmony Town Hall	Yankee/1880s Village	42.867524°N 88.489458°W		1876	Front Gabled. Originally build it Town of Harmony in Rock County. Moved to Old World Wisconsin in October, 1976.
Peterson Wagon Shop	Yankee/1880s Village	42.868664°N 88.491753°W			
Sisel Shoe Shop	Yankee/1880s Village	42.868014°N 88.492082°W			
Sisel Barn	Yankee/1880s Village	42.867676°N 88.492207°W			
Stage	Yankee/1880s Village	42.868508°N 88.491284°W			
Thomas General Store	Yankee/1880s Village	42.868677°N 88.491337°W		1876	Front gabled limestone. Moved to Old World Wisconsin in 1992 from the SE corner of Hwy 18 and Waterville Road in Waukesha County.
Barn (Thomas Store)	Yankee/1880s Village	42.868886°N 88.491025°W			
Outhouse (Thomas Store)	Yankee/1880s Village	42.868714°N 88.49102°W			
Loomer Barn	Yankee/1880s Village	42.867991°N 88.490297°W		1858	Astylistic Utilitarian. The Loomer Barn was reconstructed at Old World Wisconsin in the mid-1980s as a part of the Yankee farmstead. It's an example of a three-bay threshing barn, tied to the period of heavy wheat production in southern WI.
Sanford House	Yankee/1880s Village	42.868430°N 88.490265°W			
St. Peter's Church	Yankee/1880s Village	42.869695°N 88.491801°W		1838 (oldest building on site)	Gothic Revival. Moved from 3257 S Lake Dr, St. Francis. Originally located at State and Jackson Streets in Milwaukee.
Administrative offices	Service/Admin/Misc	42.862546°N 88.501355°W			
Concession Stand	Service/Admin/Misc	42.857723°N 88.492629°W			
Entrance Sign (North 1 of 2)	Service/Admin/Misc	42.864104°N 88.487687°W			
Entrance Sign (South 2 of 2)	Service/Admin/Misc	42.863824°N 88.487754°W			
Farmhouse	Service/Admin/Misc	42.857907°N 88.499971°W			
Farmhouse barn	Service/Admin/Misc	42.857759°N 88.500708°W			
Farmhouse garage	Service/Admin/Misc	42.858009°N 88.500124°W			
Farmhouse shed	Service/Admin/Misc	42.857920°N 88.500573°W			
Farmhouse wellhouse	Service/Admin/Misc	42.857823°N 88.500460°W			
Greenhouse	Service/Admin/Misc	42.858095°N 88.499865°W			
Machinery building	Service/Admin/Misc	42.858327°N 88.499957°W			
Maintenance building	Service/Admin/Misc	42.859052°N 88.501964°W			
Maintenance shed	Service/Admin/Misc	42.858658°N 88.501923°W			
Maintenance shed	Service/Admin/Misc	42.859065°N 88.502321°W			
Picnic Shelter	Service/Admin/Misc	42.857824°N 88.493041°W			
Public Restrooms (German Area)	Service/Admin/Misc	42.866813°N 88.498577°W			
Public Restrooms (Norwegian Area)	Service/Admin/Misc	42.857850°N 88.492655°W			
Rustic Restrooms	Service/Admin/Misc	42.864614°N 88.490286°W			
Storage Barn	Service/Admin/Misc	42.859129°N 88.498792°W			
Tram stop shelter	Service/Admin/Misc	42.867992°N 88.489835°W			
