= Spruce Lake Bog =

State-protected natural area in Fond du Lac County, Wisconsin

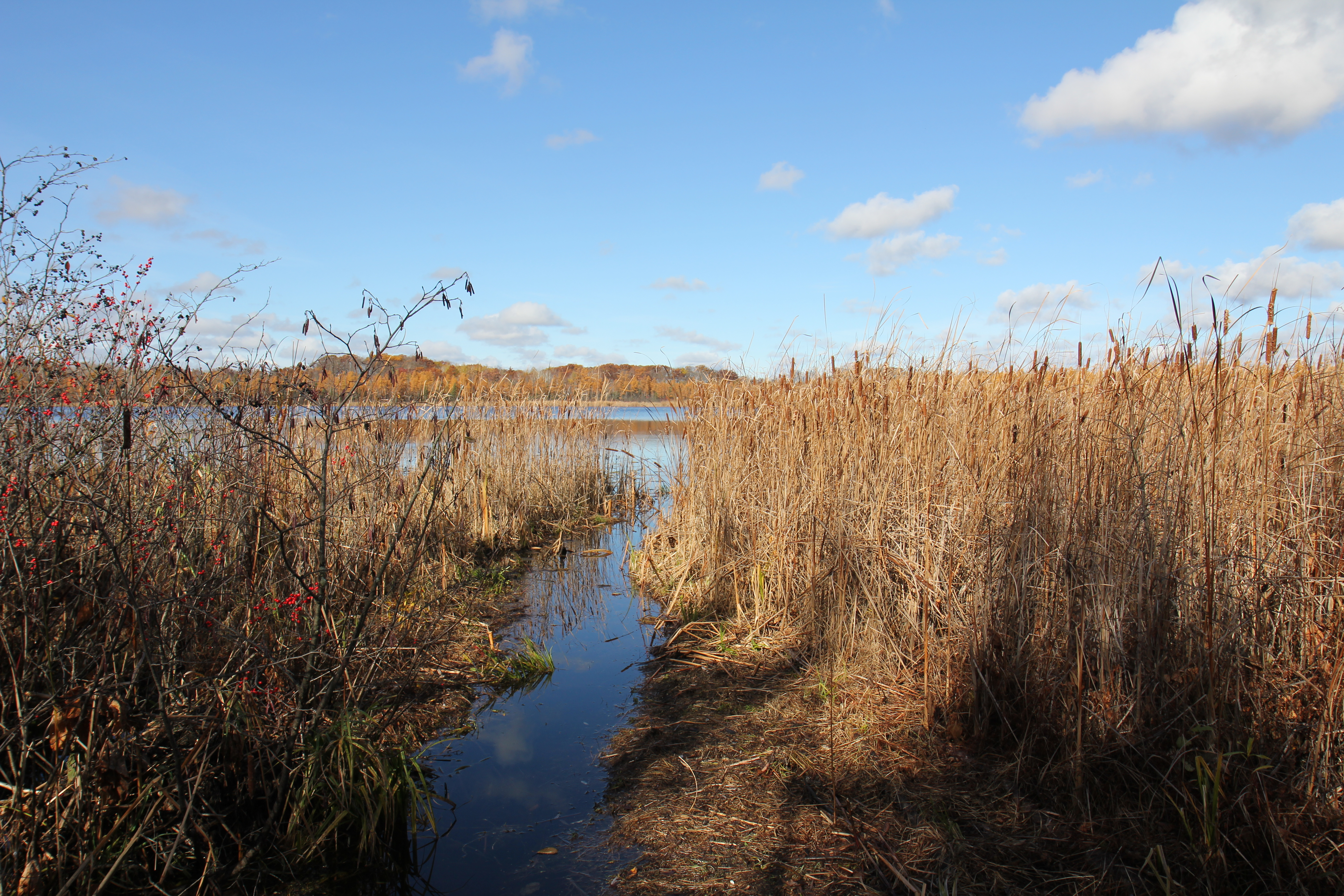
- A creek entering Spruce Lake Bog

- Location within Wisconsin
- Location: Fond du Lac County, Wisconsin
- Coordinates: 43°40′13″N 88°12′03″W
- Area: 140 acres (57 ha)

U.S. National Natural Landmark
- Designated: 1973

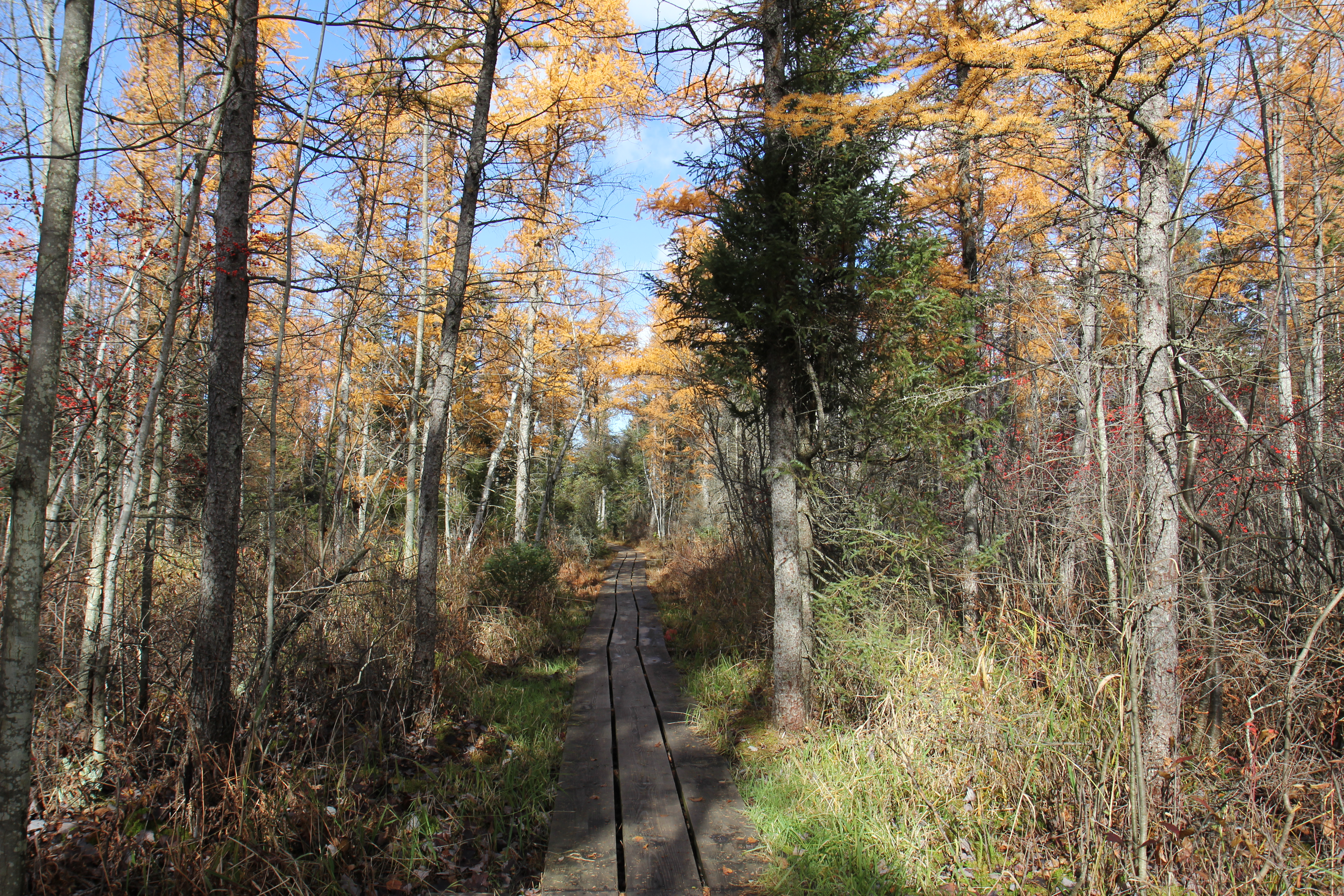
Boardwalk at the Spruce Lake Bog

Spruce Lake Bog is a 140-acre (57 ha) bog in Fond du Lac County, Wisconsin. It is located within Kettle Moraine State Forest. The bog was designated a Wisconsin State Natural Area in 1968 and a National Natural Landmark in 1973.
