= Hubertus, Wisconsin =

- Unincorporated Community
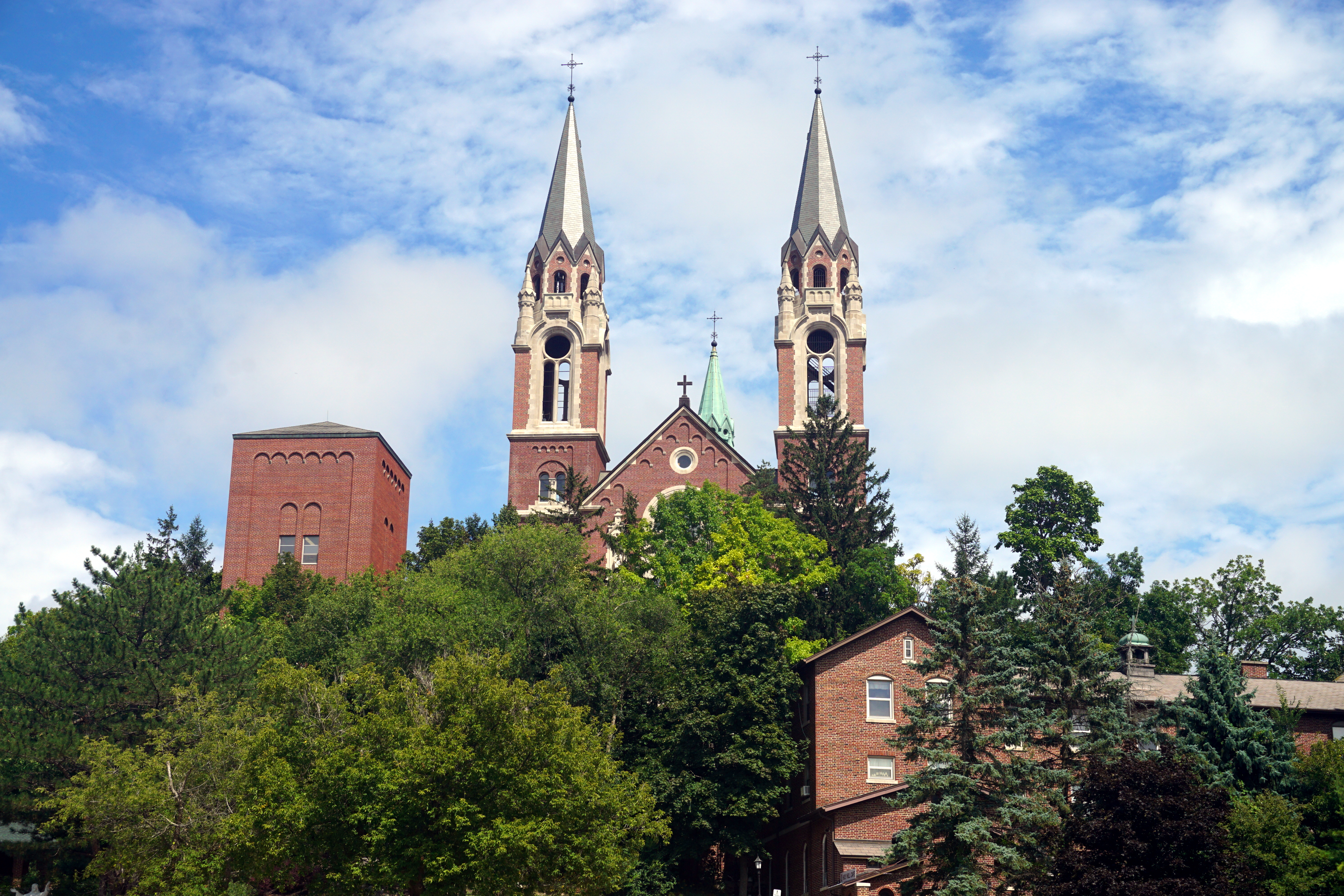
- Holy Hill Basilica and National Shrine of Mary

- Location within Wisconsin Location within the United States
- Coordinates: 43°14′12″N 88°13′16″W
- Country: United States
- State: Wisconsin
- County: Washington
- Elevation: 1,010 ft (310 m)
- Time zone: UTC-6 (Central (CST))
  - Summer (DST): UTC-5 (CDT)
- ZIP code: 53033
- Area code: 262
- GNIS feature ID: 1566787

Hubertus is an unincorporated community in the village of Richfield, Washington County, Wisconsin, United States. The community was named after the former St. Hubert Catholic parish, now joined with St. Gabriel Parish. Holy Hill National Shrine of Mary, Help of Christians is located in the area.

== Education ==
Crown of Life Lutheran School is a PK-8 grade school of the Wisconsin Evangelical Lutheran Synod in Hubertus.

== Notable person ==
- Alex Kister, creator of the Mandela Catalogue

== See also ==
- Kettle Moraine Scenic Drive
