= Kettle Moraine State Forest - Southern Unit at Whitewater Lake =

State Forest in Walworth County, Wisconsin

Southern Unit Kettle Moraine State Forest
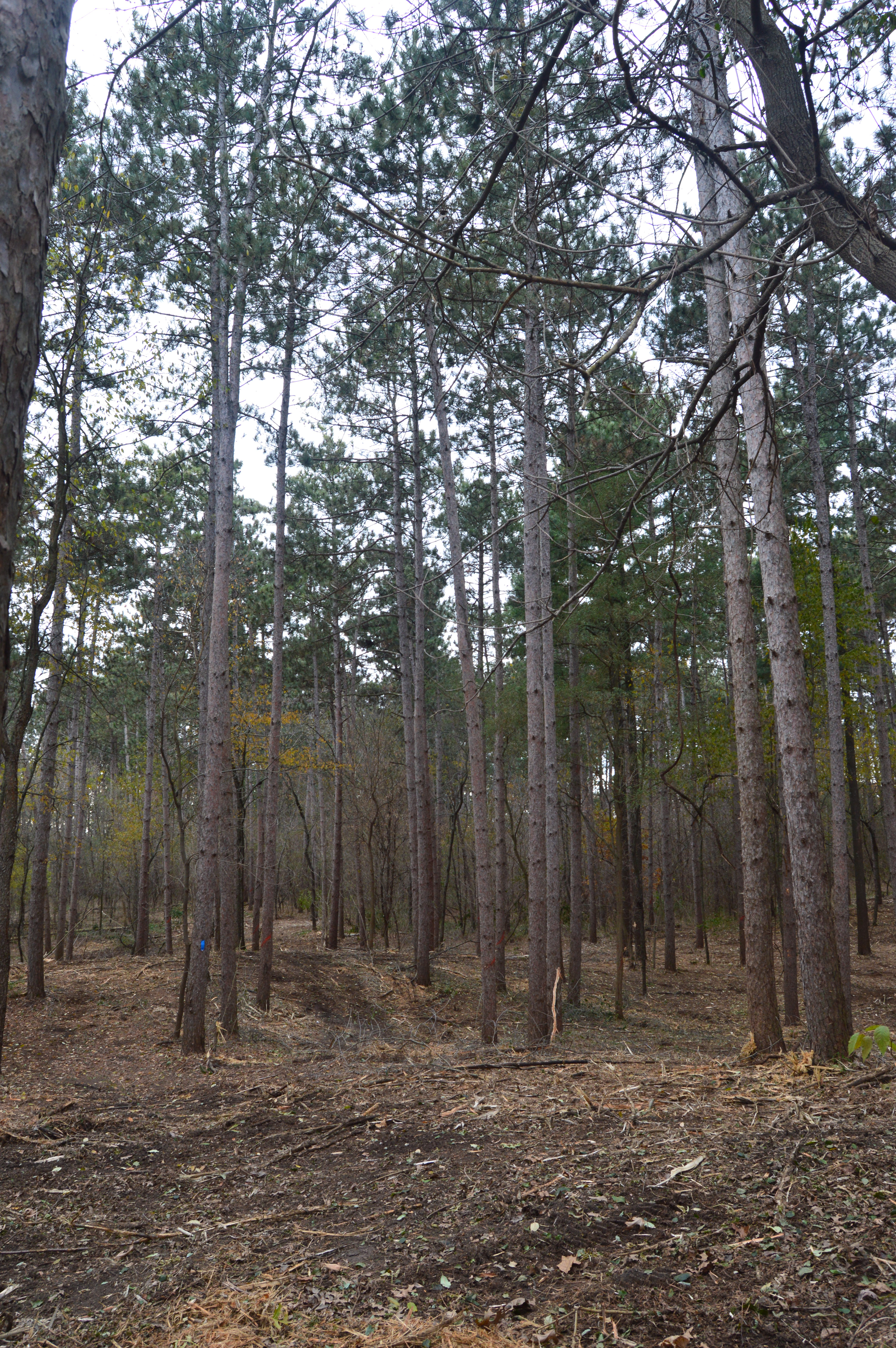
- A grove of pine trees located next to a section of the Ice Age Trail near Whitewater Lake Campground

- Location within Wisconsin Location within the United States
- Location: Waukesha, Walworth, and Jefferson counties, Wisconsin, United States
- Coordinates: 42°52′35″N 88°31′31″W
- Established: 1936
- Visitors: 1,432,122 (in 2024)
- Administrator: Wisconsin Department of Natural Resources
- Website: Official website

The Southern Unit of the Kettle Moraine State Forest includes more than 22,000 acres of land throughout southern Wisconsin and spans several state parks and natural areas. The area also features varied environments from restored prairie, forests, and lakes, along with providing a multitude of recreational opportunities such as hiking, birdwatching, fishing, camping, and hunting. The Kettle Moraine Scenic Drive also extends within this region as well as through a larger portion of the state.

This section of the state forest has campgrounds at some of the larger nature reserves like Whitewater Lake, Ottawa Lake, and Pinewoods. There are also several horse-accessible campsites for trail riding.

Some more well-known trails throughout the Southern Unit are the Ice Age Trail, Scuppernong Trails, John Muir Trails, and Emma Carlin Trails. These pass within the Kettle Moraine's state natural areas and some even connect different state parks or other trails throughout Wisconsin to one another. Some of these trails provide opportunities for more primitive camping within designated sections along them.

== Natural features ==
=== Whitewater Lake ===
Whitewater Lake, located in Walworth County, is an extension of the Kettle Moraine's Southern Unit and is part of the southernmost edge of its territory. This 625 acre lake is located in the country side near Whitewater, Wisconsin, and has several public access points for boat launching and fishing. Commonly home to Panfish and Largemouth Bass, the lake draws fishers year round. Northern Pike and Walleye are also present in this lake but are less common.

The land around the lake is rural and consists of a mix of private residences, farms, as well as protected forest lands and a restored prairie habitat. A portion of the Ice Age Trail also extends through a section of forest near the lake and provides day trip hiking and backpacking opportunities.

The forest around Whitewater Lake consists of a mix of several species of oak, maple, birch, pine, and other trees. It also contains Whitewater Lake Campground which provides sites for overnight camping stays and hiking trails.

=== Rice Lake ===
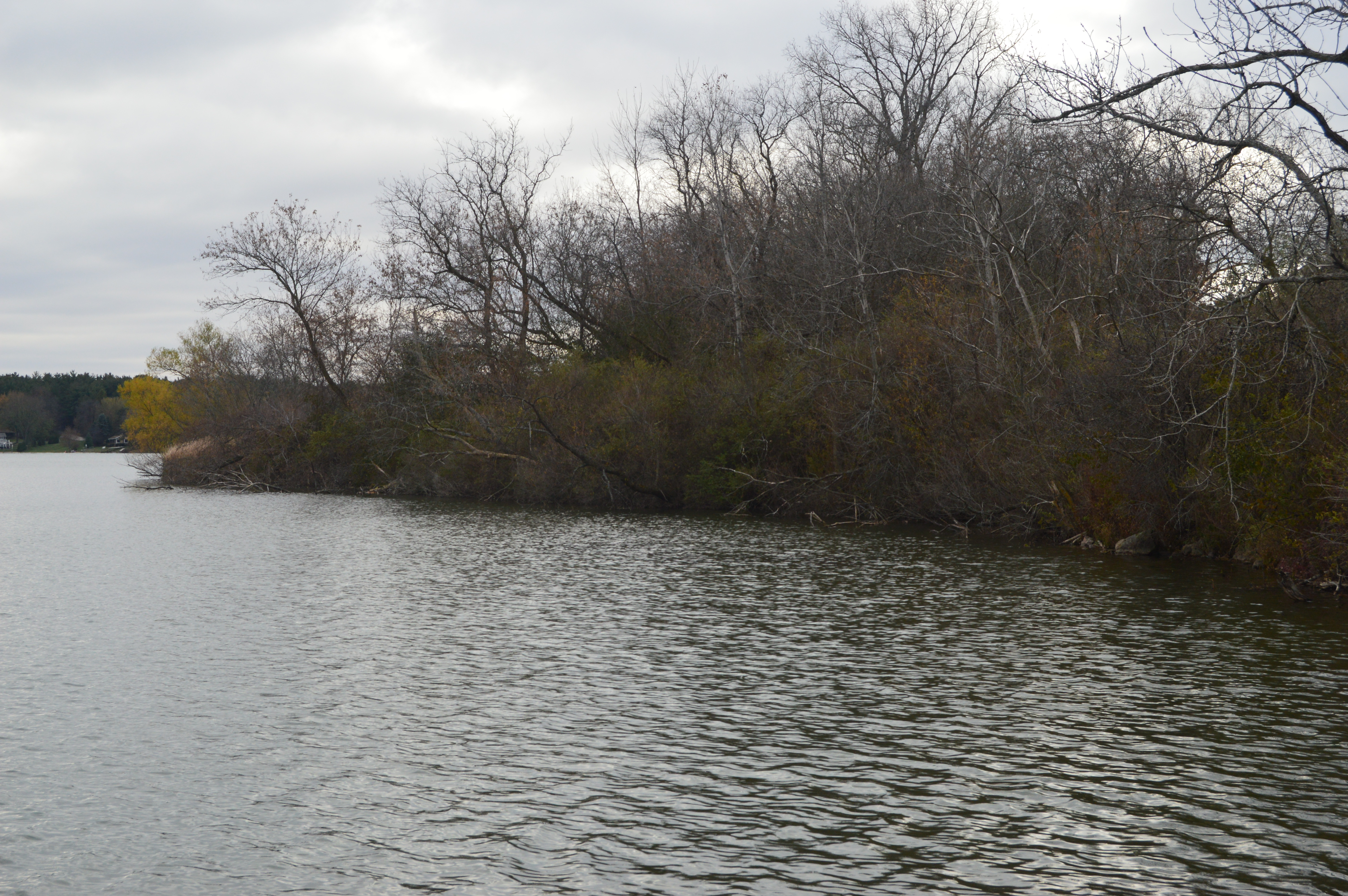
A view of Rice Lake from the shoreline

Rice Lake is smaller than Whitewater Lake at 144 acres, is also located in Walworth County, and they are both connected by water flow. The Wisconsin Department of Natural Resources states that this connected lake also provides a habitat for panfish, largemouth bass, and northern pike.

=== Clifford Messinger Dry Prairie and Savanna Preserve ===
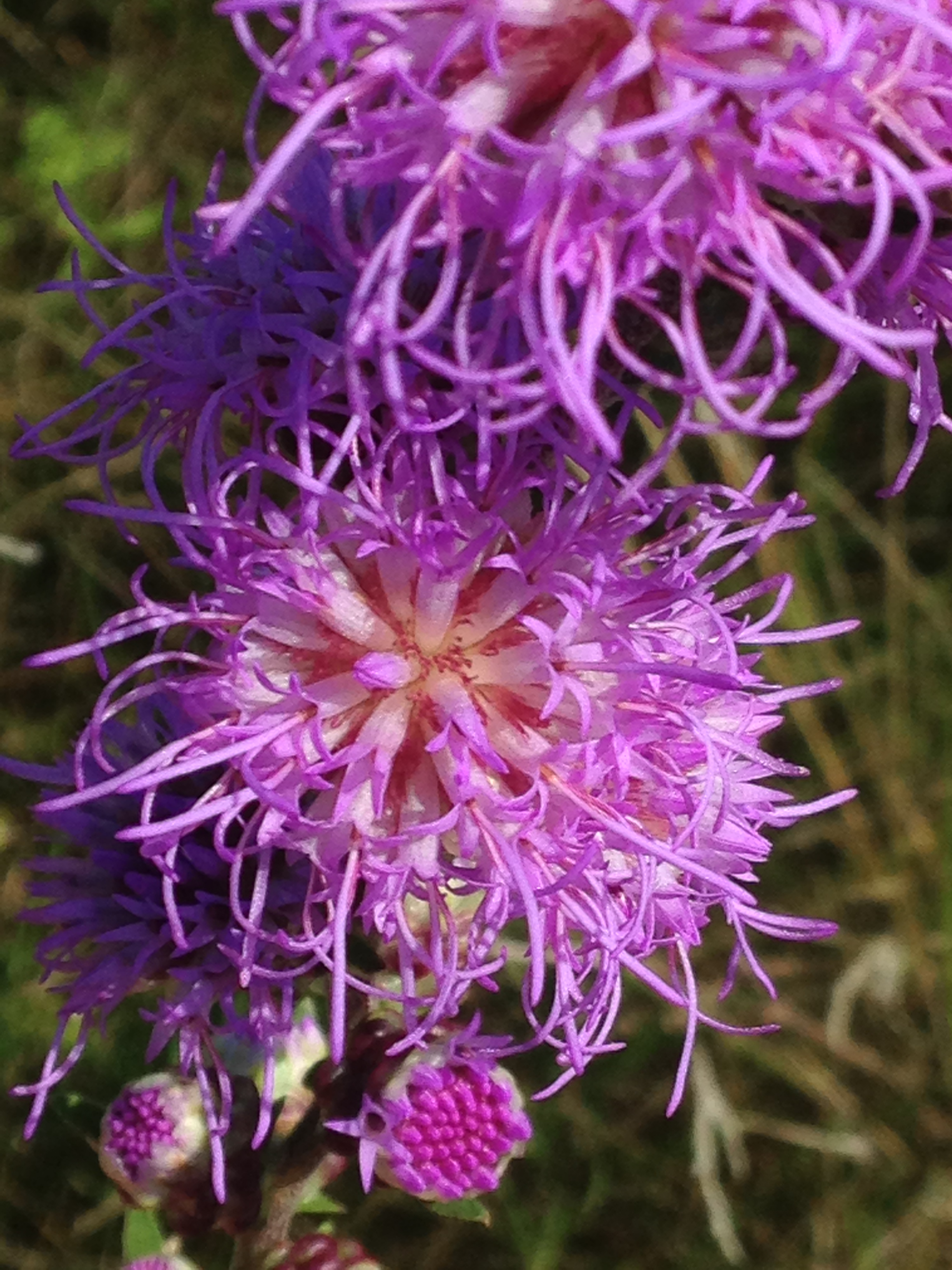
A close up of prairie blazing-star, a flowering species of plant that can be found in SNA 230

The Clifford Messinger Dry Prairie and Savanna Preserve is a State Natural Area of Wisconsin that covers 254 acres. It consists of several different locations in the Southern Unit and features sections of restored prairie and savanna. This preserve is SNA, or State Natural Area, number 230. The plants found here are common fixtures in prairie ecosystems, such as side-oats grama, goldenrod, and blazing-star. The Wisconsin DNR owns this SNA and manages occasional controlled burns to mimic natural fires that are beneficial to the native prairie and oak savanna habitats found here.

A section of this State Natural Area is located alongside Whitewater Lake and adjoins the surrounding forest area.

=== Ice Age Trail ===
The Ice Age Trail is a volunteer-maintained National Scenic Trail found in Wisconsin that spans approximately 1,200 miles and 31 counties. It is a work in progress with new land continuously being added or improved upon to restore and protect the natural ecosystems found along it while establishing more sections of trail. The trail is designed to follow the path that the last glaciers carved on the land as they passed through Wisconsin. A section of this trail extends past Whitewater Lake.
