= Whitewater Lake (Wisconsin) =

Lake in the state of Wisconsin, United States

- Location within Wisconsin Location within the United States
- Location: Walworth County, Wisconsin
- Coordinates: 42°45′55″N 88°41′41″W
- Type: Drainage, pre-glacial valley
- Primary outflows: Whitewater Creek
- Basin countries: United States
- Surface area: 640 acres (2.6 km^{2})
- Average depth: 10 ft (3.0 m)
- Max. depth: 42 ft (13 m)
- Surface elevation: 869 ft (265 m)
- Islands: 4

Whitewater Lake is located in Walworth County, Wisconsin, United States in the Kettle Moraine State Forest.

Whitewater Lake is associated through a flow with Rice Lake. Fish found in the lake include northern pike, largemouth bass, walleye, and blue gill. In the winter the lake is strewn with ice shanties when fisherman compete in the Lions Annual February "Fish-A-Ree".

Because of its location near Kettle Moraine State Forest and Natureland County Park, the area is known for biking (on-road and off-road), golf, hiking, camping, hang gliding, cross-country skiing, water skiing, swimming, fishing, and boating.

Native Americans once referred to Whitewater as "Minneiska", now the name of the local Minneiska Ski Team.

Heart Prairie Lutheran Church and Cemetery, a 150-year-old pioneer Norwegian church, sits on the shores of the lake. The church, which is on the National Register of Historic Places, is still in its original state and continues to hold summer services by oil lamp.

A smaller Whitewater Lake, a Bass Lake, a Round Lake, and a pre-glacial valley preceded the current Whitewater Lake in the same location. These lakes and the valley were impounded in 1946–47 to create the current lake. An attempt had been made to do the same in 1927, but legal action forced removal of impounding gates.

Major features of the lake include a length of 2.6 miles (4.2 km), a width of 0.6 miles (0.97 km), a shoreline length of 10.0 miles (16.1 km), a north bay, a south bay, and a central peninsula, a long ridge of gravel and other sediment called an esker, 1.3 miles (2.1 km) long, extending from the north of the lake, and topped by Ridge Road.

Whitewater Lake has its major streamflow into the lake from Whitewater Lake inlet at the south end of the lake, in the south bay, where there are several springs. Inflow to the lake from this inlet is fifteen percent of the lake inflow. Fifty-seven percent more of the lake inflow is from ground water in the ground adjacent the lake. Precipitation (rain, snow, etc.) accounts for twenty-six percent more of lake inflow. Near-lake drainage of two percent completes the inflow. The lake dam is concrete, about 10 feet (3.0 m) wide, and when water crests the dam, it flows into Whitewater Creek, which drains into Rice Lake to the north and west.

Starting from the north and moving clockwise, the following are on the shoreline or extend to the shoreline. Kettle Moraine State Forest - Southern Unit protects wooded shoreline and extends north into a camping area and a portion of the Ice Age Trail for hiking. Camp Joy to the east of the Park's reach to the shore is a Baptist summer camp and conference center. South of the peninsula, Scenic Ridge Campground provides camping, a camp store, and hosts summer performances of the Minnieska Ski Team. Nearby the Campground is Heart Prairie Church, see above. Natureland Park, a Walworth County park, is at the southwest corner of the lake, at the lake inlet, with the springs, a picnic area, pavilion, cabin, and hiking. The Whitewater Lions Club is west of Scenic Ridge. JNT's Parkside Marina is adjacent a State Park boat ramp and public beach, completing the circle of the lake.

Boating on the lake is regulated by the Town of Whitewater, with slow-no-wake areas and time-of-day speed restrictions. The area is also managed by the Whitewater-Rice Lakes Management District, which concerns itself with lake water quality and management. The Greater Whitewater Lake Property Owners Association, which represents property owners, holds events and provides area information.
