= Christian Turck House =

Historic house in Wisconsin, United States

- U.S. National Register of Historic Places
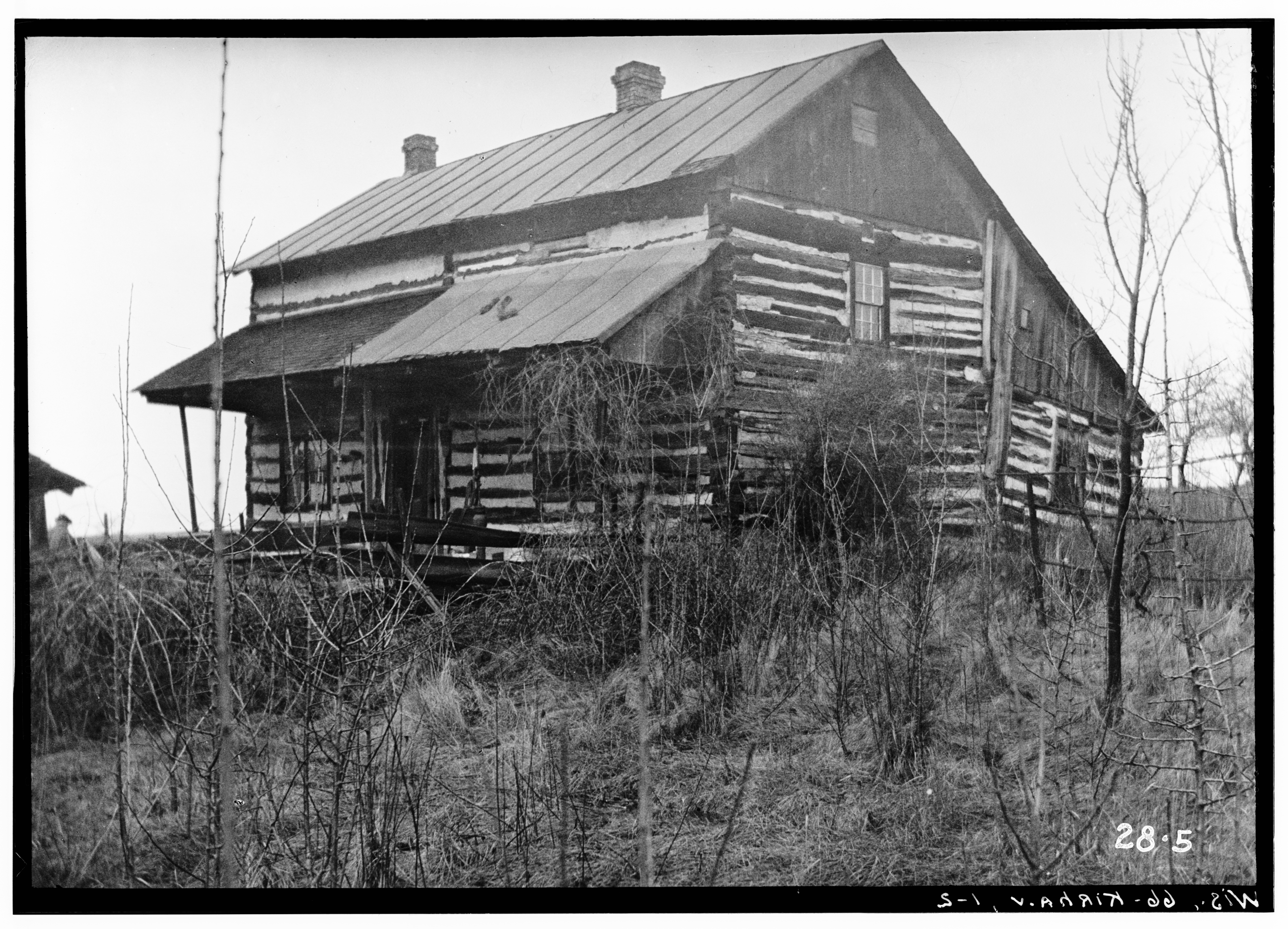
- After 1933, on its original site near Kirchhayn

- Location within Wisconsin Location within the United States
- Nearest city: Eagle, Wisconsin
- Coordinates: 43°16′16″N 88°4′50″W
- Area: 0.1 acres (0.040 ha)
- Built: 1830
- Architectural style: German Blockbau
- NRHP reference No.: 73000097
- Added to NRHP: October 25, 1973

The Christian Turck House is a log farmhouse from the late 1830s which currently serves as a museum called the Schottler House at Old World Wisconsin in Eagle, Wisconsin, United States. It was originally built by a German immigrant near Germantown, Wisconsin. In 1973 it was added to the National Register of Historic Places.

In the late 1830s Christian Turck walked into a swamp near his home a mile south of Kirchhayn in Washington County and began to cut cedar logs to build a house. He squared them and laid them horizontally on top of each other, notching the corners to hold them together. A summer beam runs down the center of the house at each level, with other beams connected to it by mortise and tenon joints. Perrin points out that in this eastern German Blockbau style, the logs aren't fitted as tightly as in most Norwegian log construction, since the logs would shrink anyway, and chinking would be needed. This house was chinked with clay, rye straw, and lime plaster. The resulting log cabin was large - two stories plus attic. Across the front (sunny south) Christian built a full-width porch sheltered by a cantilevered shed roof. On the back the roof extends down to a one-story level, adding a couple rooms and giving the building a saltbox profile. Near his house, Christian laid up a brick structure which served as a smoke house, bake oven and summer kitchen.

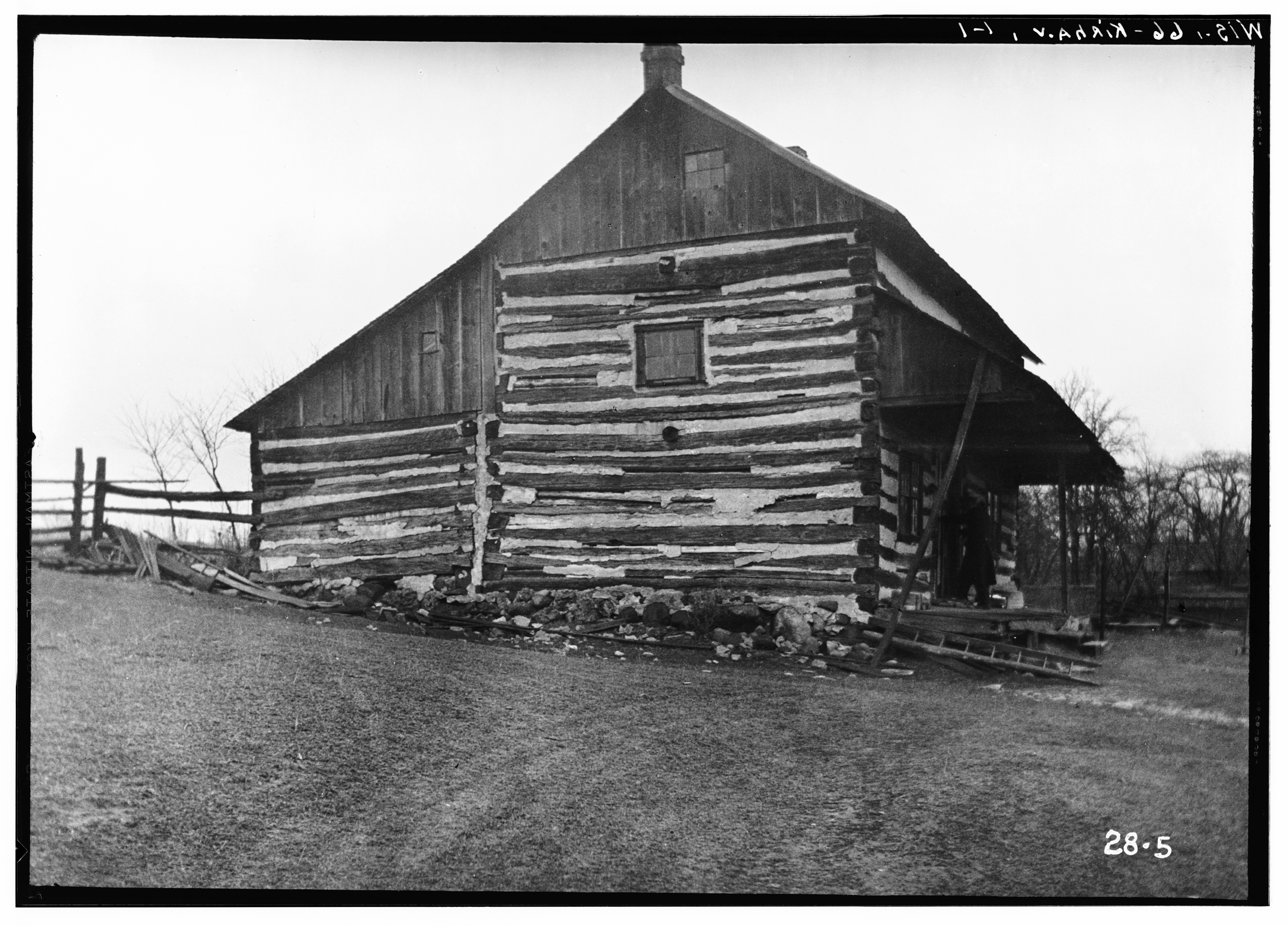
View from another angle, after 1933

Perrin points out that the Turck house is important because few examples of this German Blockbau style (solid logs) remain in Wisconsin, in contrast to the more common German Fachwerk style, where the framing logs are filled with brick or some other material. Because of this, the Historic American Buildings Survey carefully documented the house in 1936. At that time John Schottler was living in the house and the surveyor described its condition as excellent in one place and fair in another. That 1933 survey produced these documents:

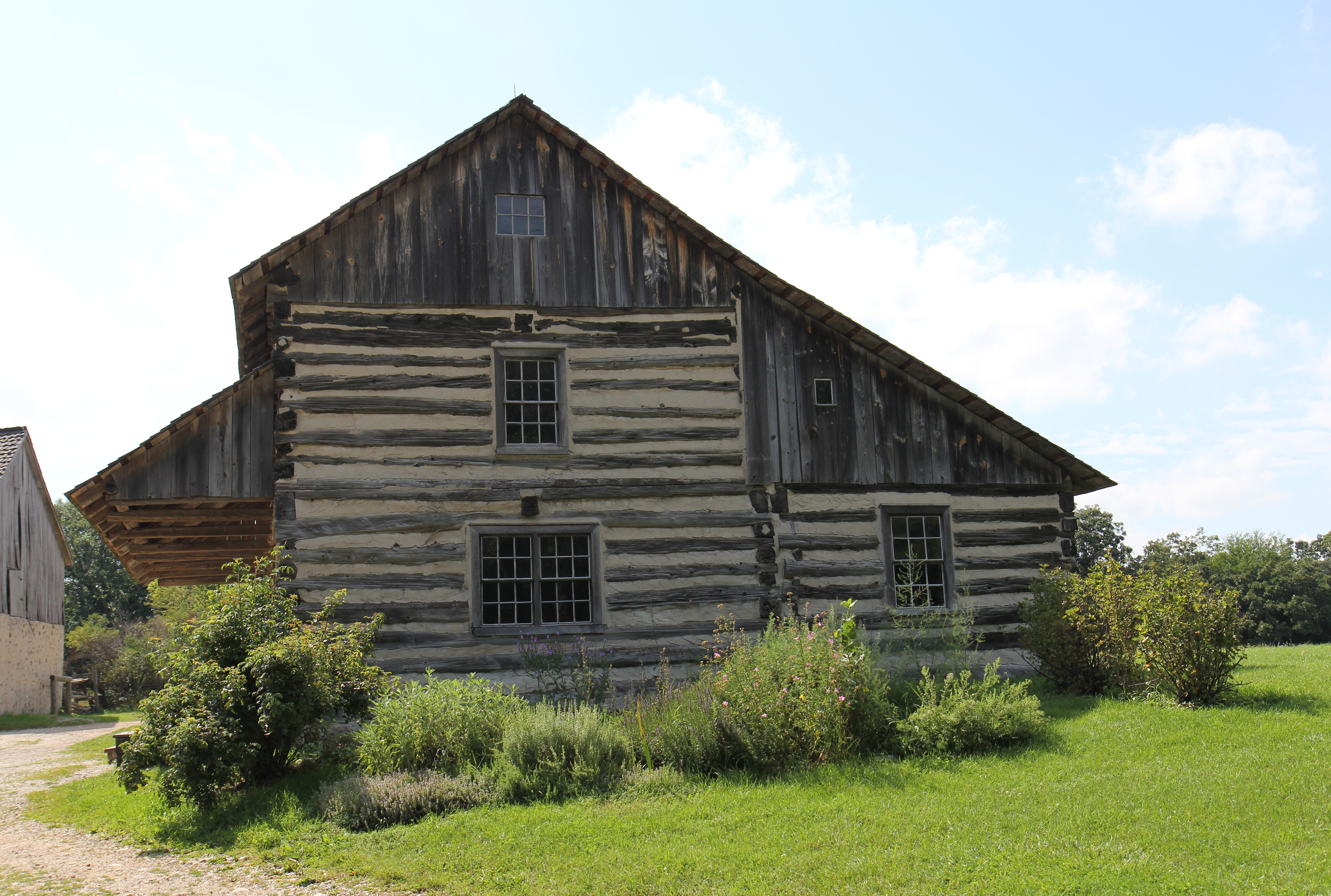
In 2013, reconstructed at Old World Wisconsin

By 1971 the NRHP nomination described the condition of the house as "ruinous." Vandalism could not be prevented in its location near Kirchhayn, and it was facing demolition. Recognizing its importance as a representative of its style, the State Historical Society bought it. Because it couldn't be moved as a whole, it was carefully disassembled, with each piece numbered, and placed in storage. A few years later, the house was moved to Old World Wisconsin and reconstructed as the Schottler House - an example German farmhouse.
