= Holy Hill National Shrine of Mary, Help of Christians =

Historic church in Wisconsin, United States

- National Shrine of the Holy Hill
- U.S. National Register of Historic Places
- U.S. Historic district
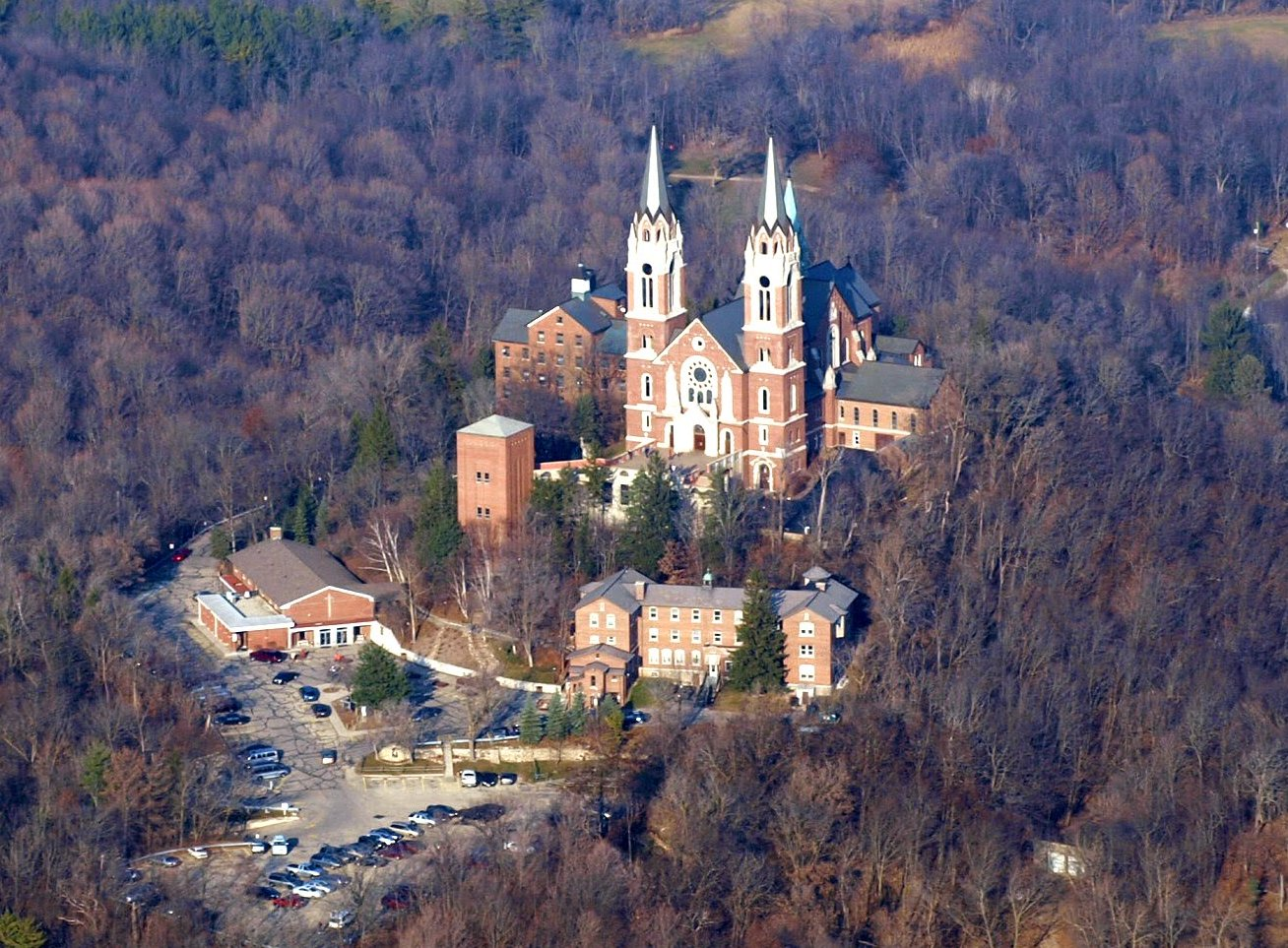
- The Basilica of the Holy Hill

- Location within Wisconsin Location within the United States
- Location: 1525 Carmel Rd., Hubertus, Wisconsin
- Coordinates: 43°14′42″N 88°19′38″W
- Area: 21 acres (8.5 ha)
- Architect: Hermann J. Gaul, Richard Philipp
- Architectural style: Romanesque Revival
- NRHP reference No.: 92000139
- Added to NRHP: March 12, 1992

The Basilica and National Shrine of Mary, Help of Christians at the Holy Hill is a Roman Catholic Marian shrine in Hubertus, Wisconsin, United States, dedicated to the Blessed Virgin Mary under the venerated title Help of Christians. The land and the shrine serves as a religious pilgrimage and attracts approximately 300,000 visitors each year.

Pope Benedict XVI raised the shrine to the status of Minor Basilica via Pontifical Decree on 11 July 2006.

== Location ==
The shrine is located atop a high kame in 400 acres (1.6 km^{2}) of woods. Visitors can climb a 178-step observation tower to view the Milwaukee skyline, about thirty miles (50 km) southeast. At approximately 1,350 feet (410 m) above sea level, it is one of the highest points in southeastern Wisconsin.

Near Wisconsin's Ice Age Trail, it is about four miles (6.5 km) east of Erin Hills, a championship golf course which hosted the U.S. Open in 2017.

== History ==
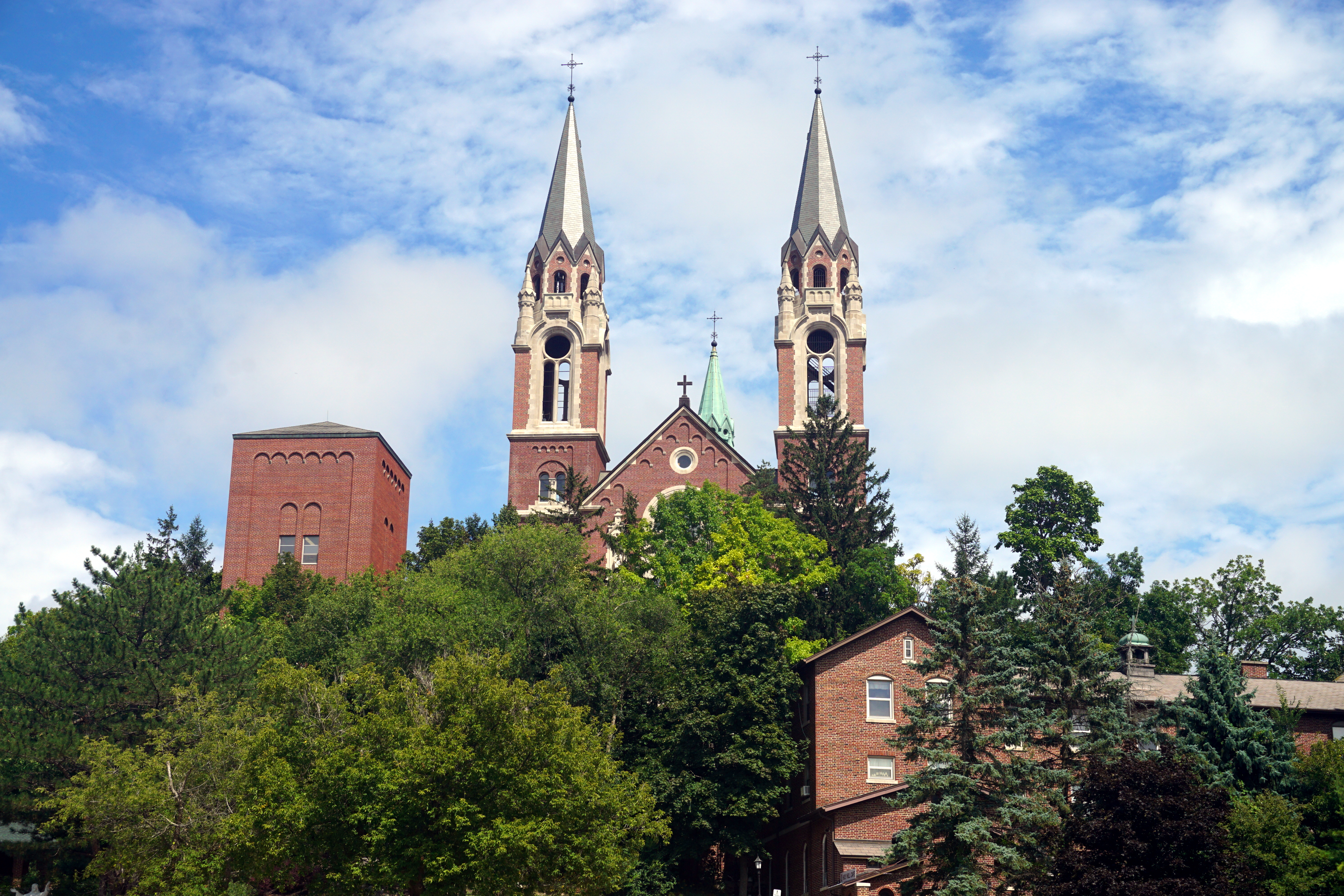
Holy Hill National Shrine of Mary, Help of Christians

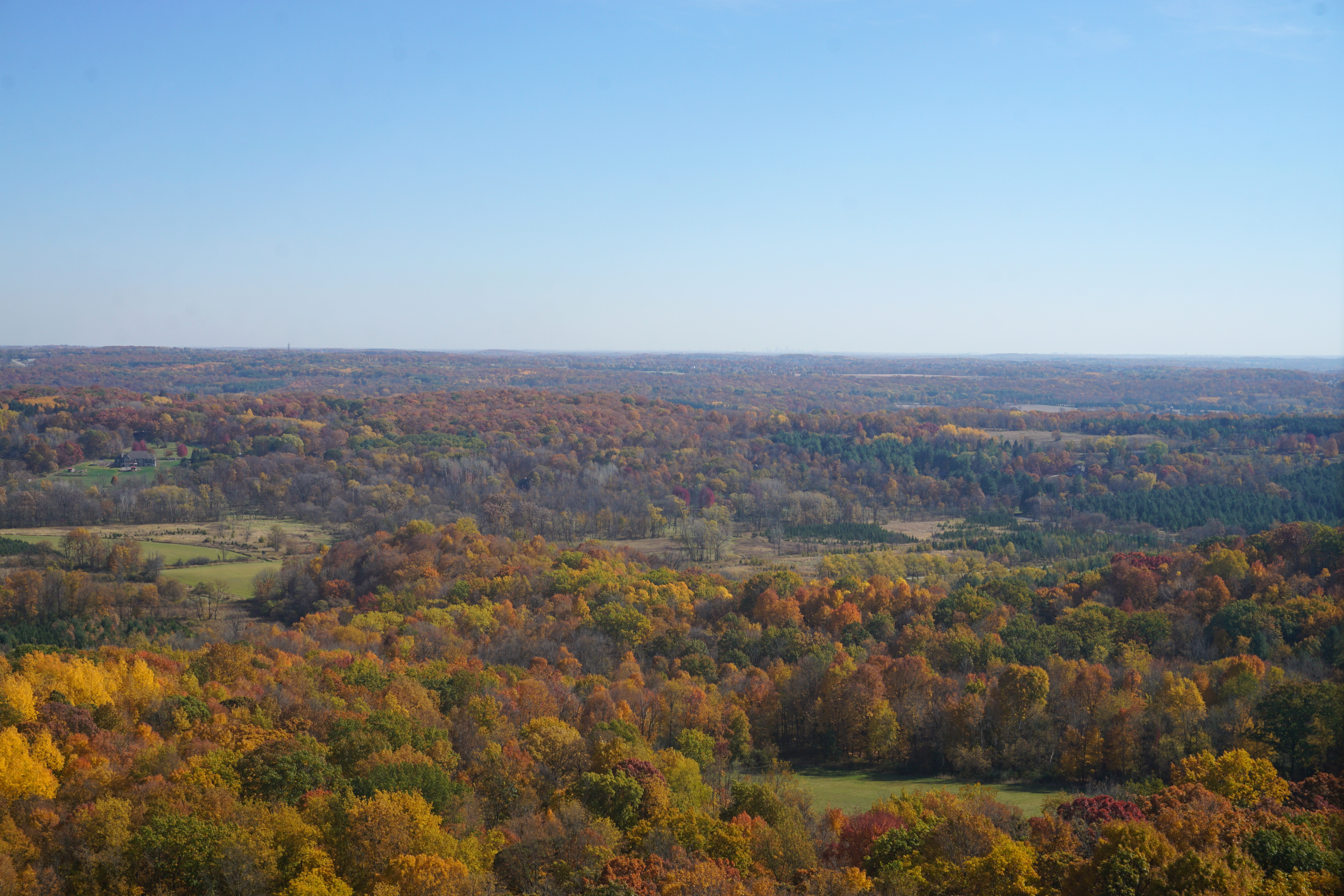
View from observation tower

Tradition says that the hill was first discovered by Europeans 353 years ago in 1673 by Father Jacques Marquette with Louis Jolliet. However, modern historians view this tradition as untrue, though the Order of the Society of Jesus were likely the first Catholic priests to set foot on the hill.

The U.S. government owned the land until 1855, and the hill was known as "Government Hill" because surveying work was done there. Forty acres were purchased by Fr. Paulhuber of Salzburg, Austria.

The first white resident of the hill was a hermit named François Soubrio. Around 1862, an area farmer found him living on the hill. Soubrio had heard about the hill when he was working as an assistant to a retired professor in Quebec, Canada. He had found an old French diary and map dated 1676 showing a cone-shaped mountain in Wisconsin. The diary described how the author placed a stone altar, raised a cross, and dedicated the hill to Jesus's mother Mary. The diary account corresponds with Jesuit missionary work in the area between 1673 and 1679.

The name "Holy Hill" was first given to the place by Irish settlers in the area. Father George Strickner dedicated a log chapel as the first Shrine of Mary, Help of Christians on May 24, 1863. A set of wooden crosses were placed for the Stations of the Cross in 1875. In the winter of 1879, Fr. Raess sent a proposal to Archbishop John Henni to construct a new shrine to Mary. Construction began that spring. Pilgrims began flocking to the shrine, and it was decided that a religious order should administer the shrine. A group of Discalced Carmelites came from Bavaria at the invitation of Archbishop Sebastian Messmer, and the Shrine of Mary was put under their care on June 26, 1906. The building now known as the Old Monastery Inn and Retreat Center was completed in 1920. The second shrine was removed in 1925 so that a third shrine could be built. The cornerstone of the third and present shrine was placed by Archbishop Messmer on August 22, 1926. The present church was completed and consecrated in 1931.

Another tradition describes a German priest who was recreant to his vows and came to America for penance. He found a reference to the hill in Marquette's diary and decided to take a pilgrimage. He became ill in Chicago, and was paralyzed. He reportedly found the hill, crawled to the summit on his hands, and was cured of his paralysis.

== Basilica Church ==
The Basilica offers Catholic Masses, services, and Marian devotions daily.

The Basilica church was built in 1930. At its entrance are two eight-foot-tall statues which were placed there in 1958: statue on the left depicts St. Mary, Help of Christians and the one on the right depicts St. Joseph, protector of the Carmelites. The interior features mosaics of the Founders of the Discalced Carmelite Order, St. Teresa of Jesus (of Avila) and St. John of the Cross.

== Repairs ==
The church underwent a $6.1 million renovation between 2002 and 2006. The renovations included extensive interior decorative painting, faux stone and mosaic by Conrad Schmitt Studios and exterior repairs, including a new slate roof for the monastery, main church, and bell tower.

On June 6, 2006, being numerically signified as "06/06/06", vandals spray-painted the church and several shrines with expletives and references to Satan and the Number of the Beast. The vandals were two teenage boys. The cost of removing the graffiti was more than $33,000.

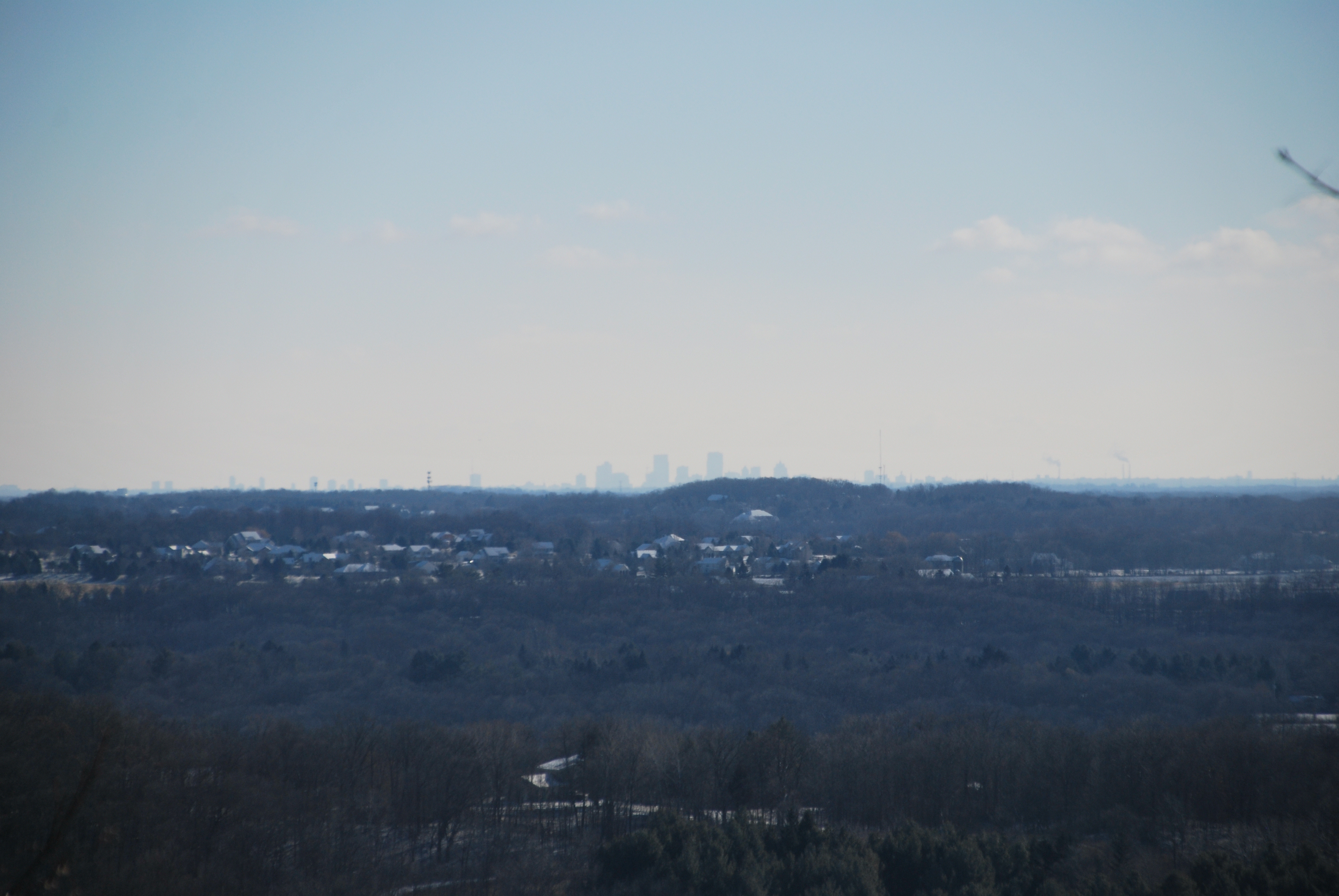
View of Milwaukee Skyline from Holy Hill

On May 26, 2013, four new cast-bronze entry doors were dedicated by Archbishop Jerome E. Listecki. Architect Duncan G. Stroik designed the doors, which contain scenes sculpted by artist Cody Swanson: St. Teresa of Avila, the Annunciation with St. Mary and St. Gabriel the Archangel, and St. John of the Cross.

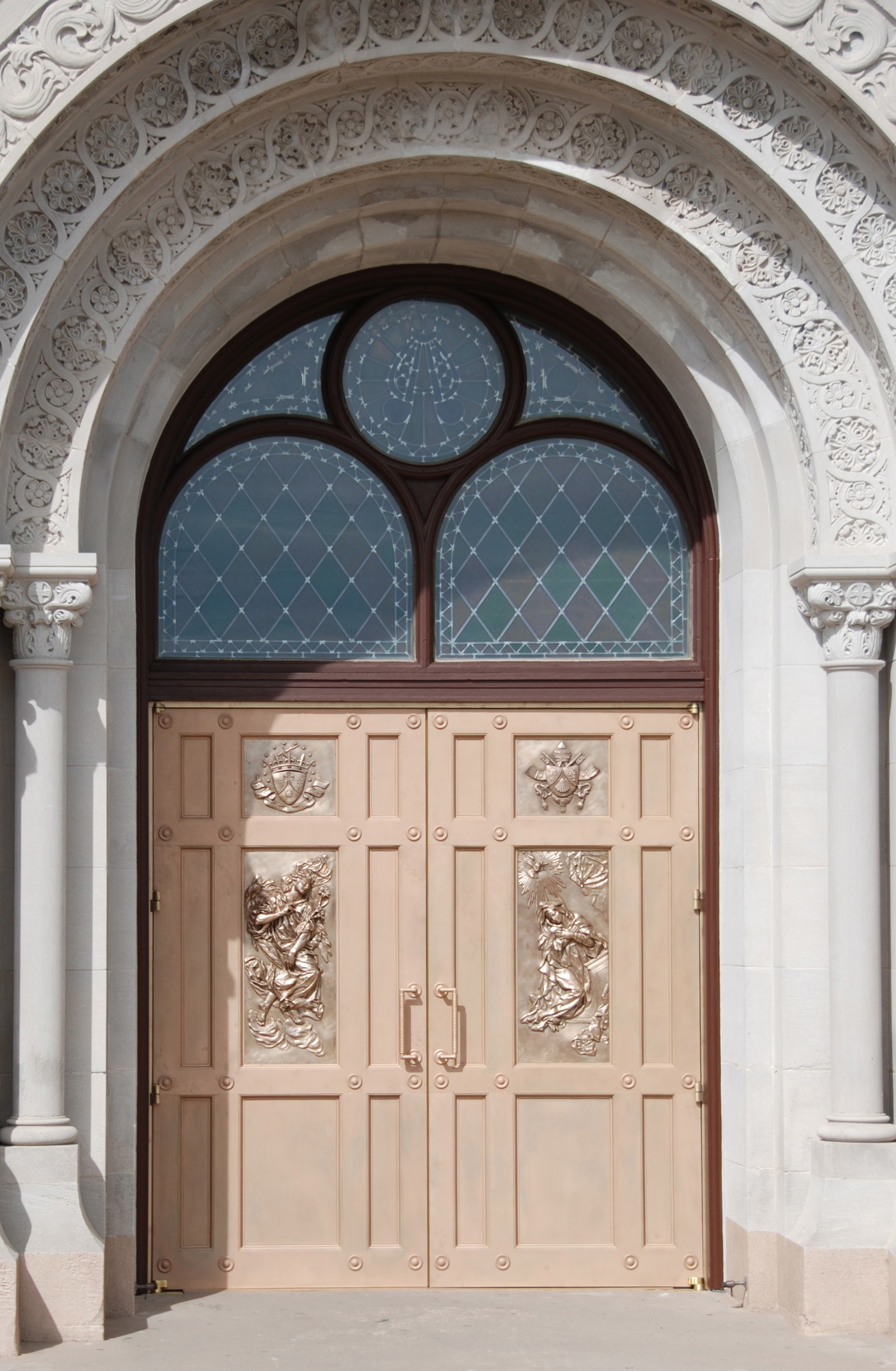
The central cast-bronze entry doors at Holy Hill National Shrine depicting the Annunciation with St. Mary and St. Gabriel the Archangel.

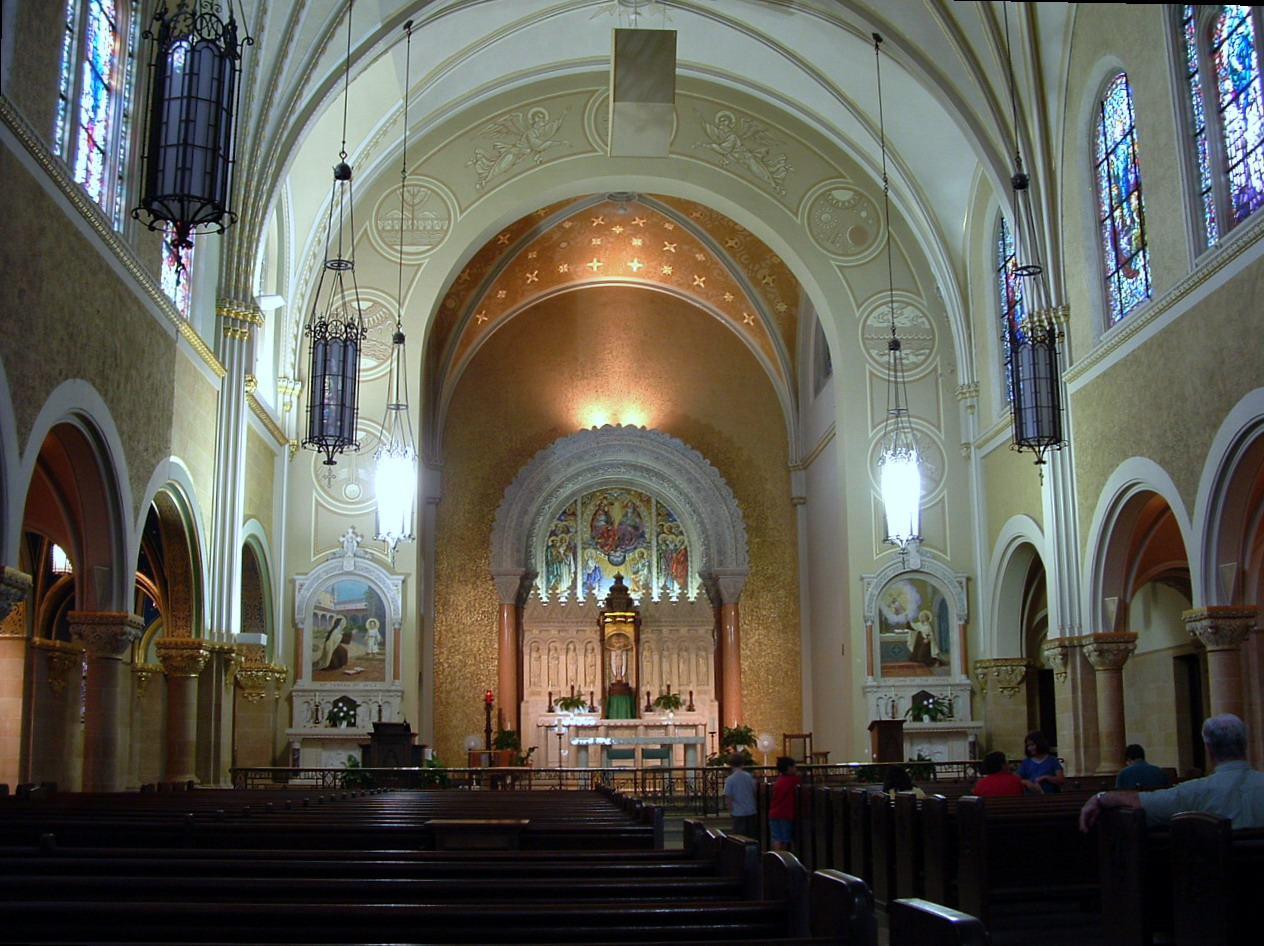
Interior prior to the restoration

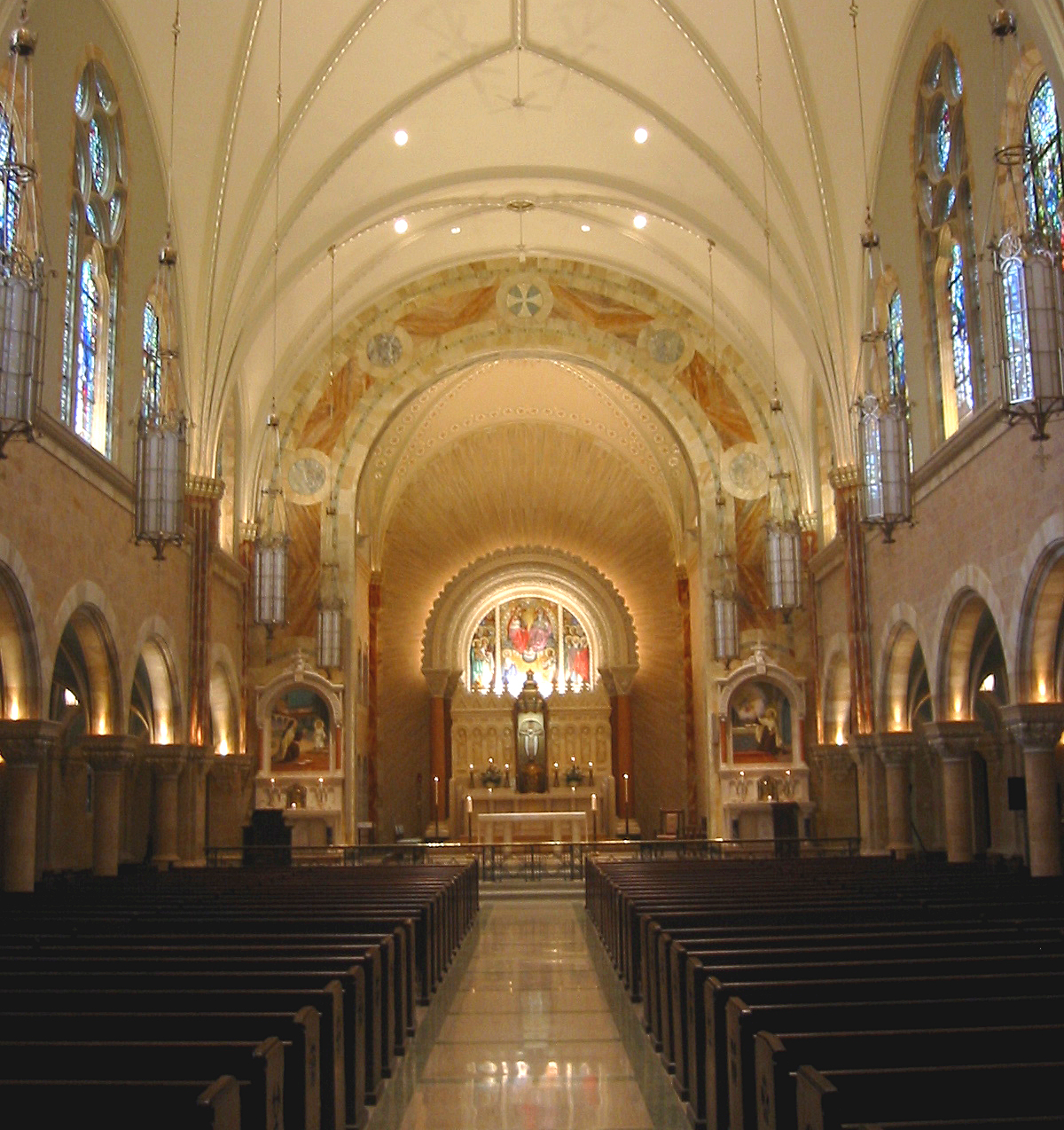
Restored interior

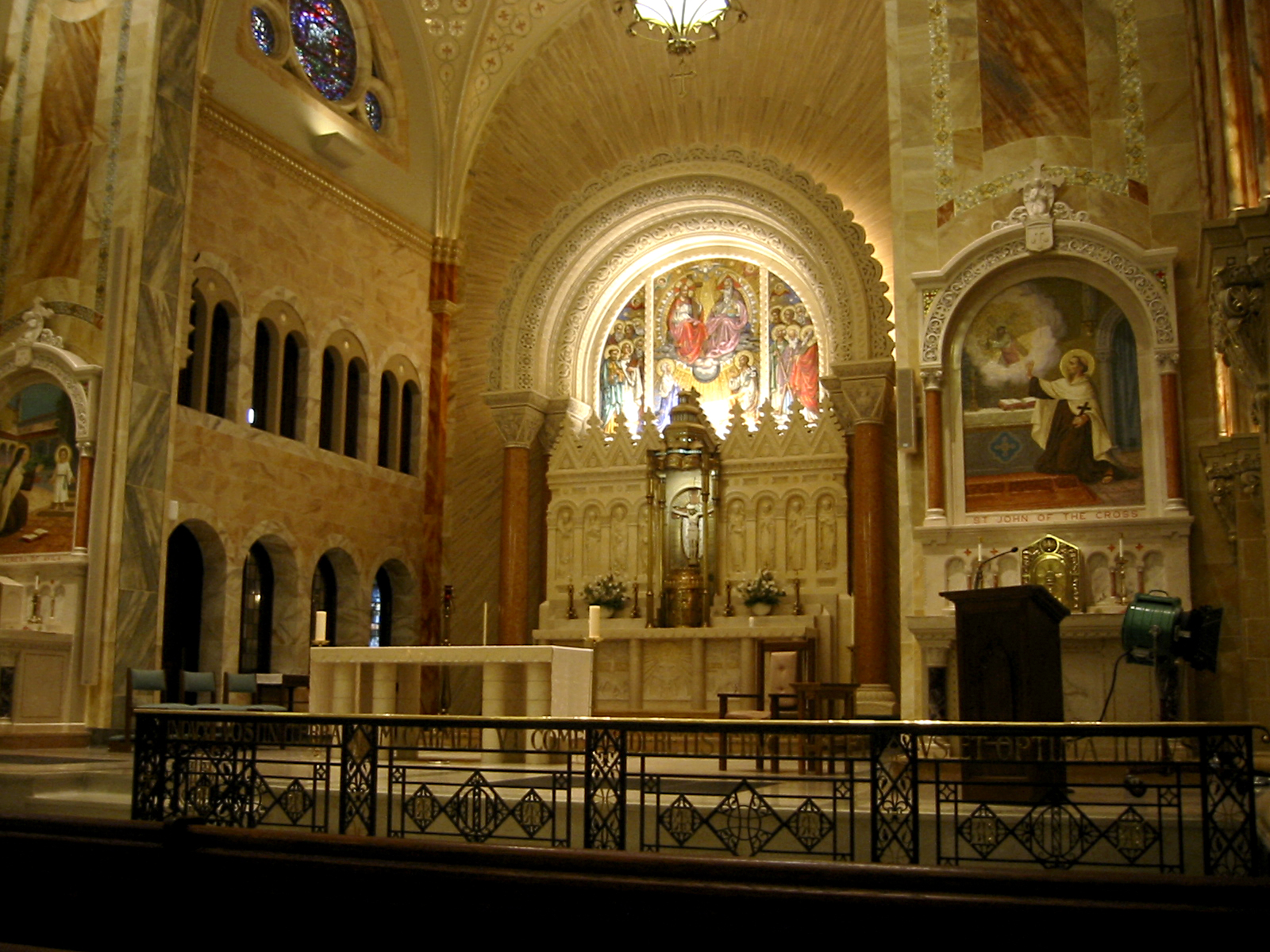
Restored sanctuary

== Milestones ==
The shrine is listed on the National Register of Historic Places. On July 16, 2006, a Mass was held celebrating 100 years of Carmelite stewardship at the site. During that Mass it was announced that Pope Benedict XVI (the reigning pope at the time) had named Holy Hill a minor basilica. Holy Hill was dedicated as a minor basilica by Archbishop Timothy Dolan on November 19, 2006. There are about 85 minor basilicas in the United States.

New York Cardinal Timothy Dolan drew a large crowd of Catholics and well-wishers to Holy Hill on April 28, 2012, for a special Mass of Thanksgiving, some arriving as early as 4:30 a.m. to ensure a spot in the historic Basilica of the National Shrine of Mary Help of Christians.

== Climate ==
Holy Hill

Climate chart (precipitation, max. and min. temperature)
J	F	M	A	M	J	J	A	S	O	N	D
85 −8 −11	79 −4 −13	80 4 −7	152 17 3	122 21 7	146 25 13	92 27 16	92 26 16	72 22 12	113 15 6	65 6 −2	73 −4 −10
- █ Average max. and min. temperatures in °C
- █ Precipitation totals in mm
Imperial conversion
J	F	M	A	M	J	J	A	S	O	N	D
3.3 18 12	3.1 25 9	3.1 39 19	6 63 37	4.8 70 45	5.7 77 55	3.6 81 61	3.6 79 61	2.8 72 54	4.4 59 43	2.6 43 28	2.9 25 14
- █ Average max. and min. temperatures in °F
- █ Precipitation totals in inches

== See also ==
- List of churches in the Roman Catholic Archdiocese of Milwaukee
- List of shrines#United States
- Kettle Moraine Scenic Drive
