= Lapham Peak Unit, Kettle Moraine State Forest =

Wisconsin state park

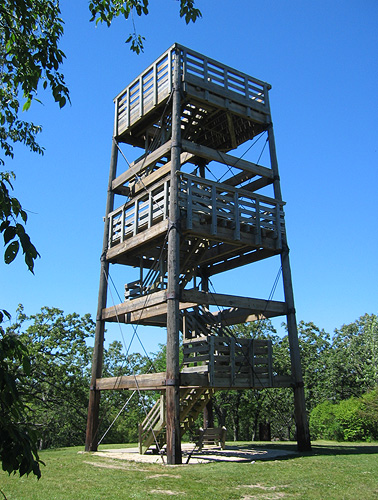
- The 45-foot (14 m) observation tower at the top of the hill

- Location within Wisconsin Location within the United States
- Interactive map of Lapham Peak Unit, Kettle Moraine State Forest
- Location: Waukesha County, Wisconsin, United States
- Nearest city: Delafield, Wisconsin
- Coordinates: 43°2′26″N 88°24′1″W
- Elevation: 1,233 feet (376 m)
- Established: 1985
- Visitors: 613,077 (in 2024)
- Administrator: Wisconsin Department of Natural Resources
- Website: Official website
- Wisconsin State Forests

Lapham Peak is a Wisconsin state park located in the Kettle Moraine State Forest. It is just south of Delafield and seven miles (11 km) west of Waukesha. The park entrance is two miles (3.2 km) north of the Glacial Drumlin State Trail.

== Activities ==
The park includes three picnic areas, birdwatching, a butterfly garden, a prairie restoration area, an amphitheater, and over 25 miles (40 km) of dirt and accessible paved nature trails. A backpacking campsite located beside a four-mile (6 km) segment of the Ice Age Trail is also in the park. There is a 5-mile (8.0 km) multi-use trail for horse riding, mountain biking, snowshoeing and dog sled training. Over 20 miles (32 km) of trails are open in the winter for cross-country skiing. The SummerStage is an outdoor stage in a natural amphitheater that hosts shows including plays, musicals, and dance as well as summer theater camps.

=== Hausmann Nature Center ===
In 1984, Bernice and Dr. Paul Haussmann donated their 8700-square-foot home to the state of Wisconsin to be converted into a nature center that would promote environmental education. The three-story 1960s building features a "rustic contemporary design" with elements of fieldstone, glass, and wood. Madison-area architect Mark Alan Kraft created the final blueprint for the rehabilitation from private residence into nature center. The center opened in June 2012.

The nature center is open two weekends a month to showcase displays and host programming; the center is staffed by volunteers. It is also available to rent for private events.

== Lapham Peak ==
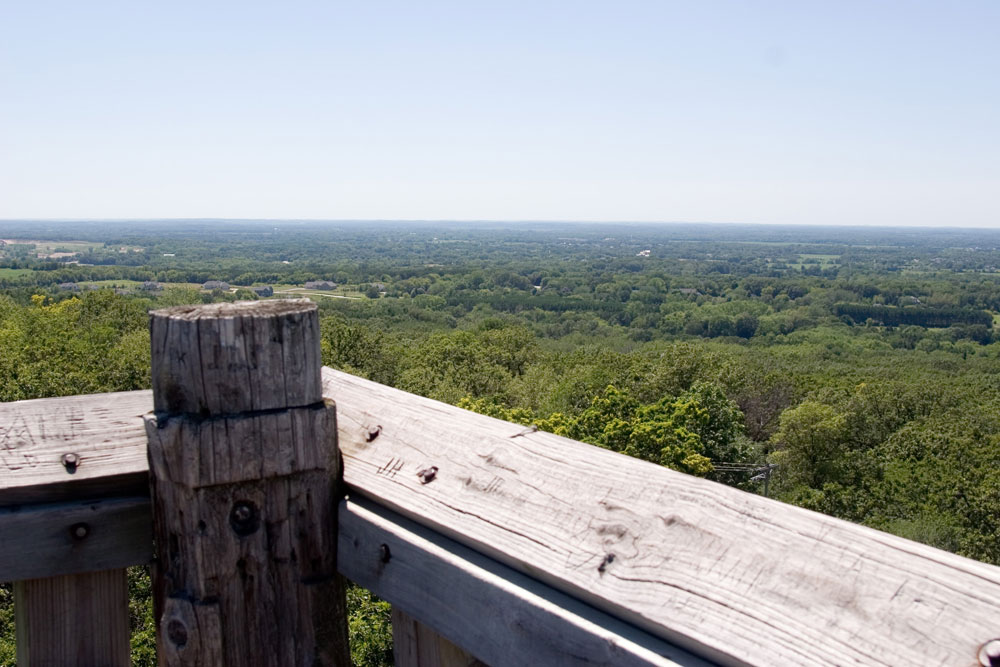
View from peak tower

The park takes its name from a hill found within its borders. Lapham Peak has an elevation of 1,233 feet (376 m) above sea level, and is the highest point in Waukesha County. At the top of Lapham Peak is a wooden observation tower that is 45 feet (14 m) high and offers a dynamic view of southeastern Wisconsin and the northern edge of Illinois. The Waukesha County Historical Society named the peak in memory of Increase A. Lapham to honor his efforts in scientific study and his founding of the United States Weather Bureau.

== History ==
The Lapham Peak area was formed 10,000 years ago by a glacier that covered much of Wisconsin (see Wisconsin glaciation). Examples of moraines, eskers and kettles can be found in the park. The peak itself is a moulin kame.

The land was developed in 1851 by Charles Hanson as a tourist attraction. He built a 20-foot (6.1 m) tower on top of the hill and charged visitors to picnic and climb the tower. Originally known as Stoney Hill, the hill was later named Government Hill, after the government teams that used it for surveying.

In 1870, the Army Signal Corps built a signal station to relay data about approaching storms from Pikes Peak, Colorado, to Great Lakes ports. Pioneering meteorologist Increase A. Lapham, who proposed the creation of a National Weather Service, made weather observations here and issued the first published national weather forecast.

The state of Wisconsin purchased the land in 1907 for a tuberculosis sanitarium, which later became the Ethan Allen School for Boys. In 1939, 50 acres (200,000 m^{2}) of the land was turned over to the Conservation Department for use as a park. The peak's 45-foot (14 m) tower was erected a year later by a crew from the WPA (Works Project Administration) who also constructed trails, picnic grounds and benches.
