= Kettle Moraine State Forest =

State forest in Wisconsin, United States

Coordinates: 43.5833°N 88.1833°W

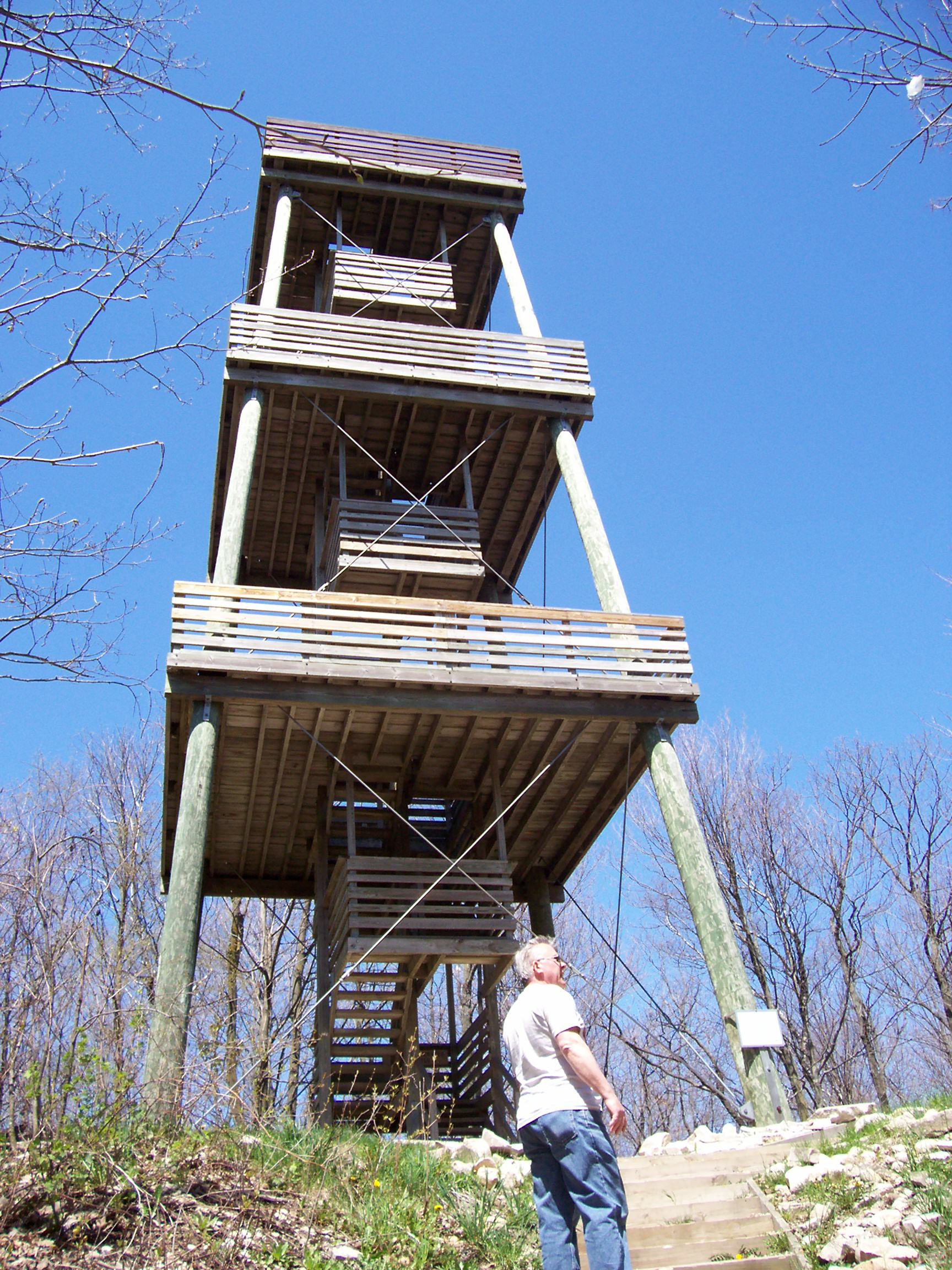
- Parnell Observation Tower

- Location within Wisconsin Location within the United States
- Interactive map of Kettle Moraine State Forest
- Location: Wisconsin, United States
- Area: 56,000 acres (23,000 ha)
- Established: 1936 (Northern & Southern units); 1960 (Pike Lake unit); 1985 (Lapham Peak unit); 1987 (Loew Lake unit); 2008 (Mukwonago River unit)
- Visitors: 1,432,122 Southern unit; 613,077 Lapham Peak unit; 572,379 Northern unit (in 2024)
- Administrator: Wisconsin Department of Natural Resources
- Wisconsin State Forests

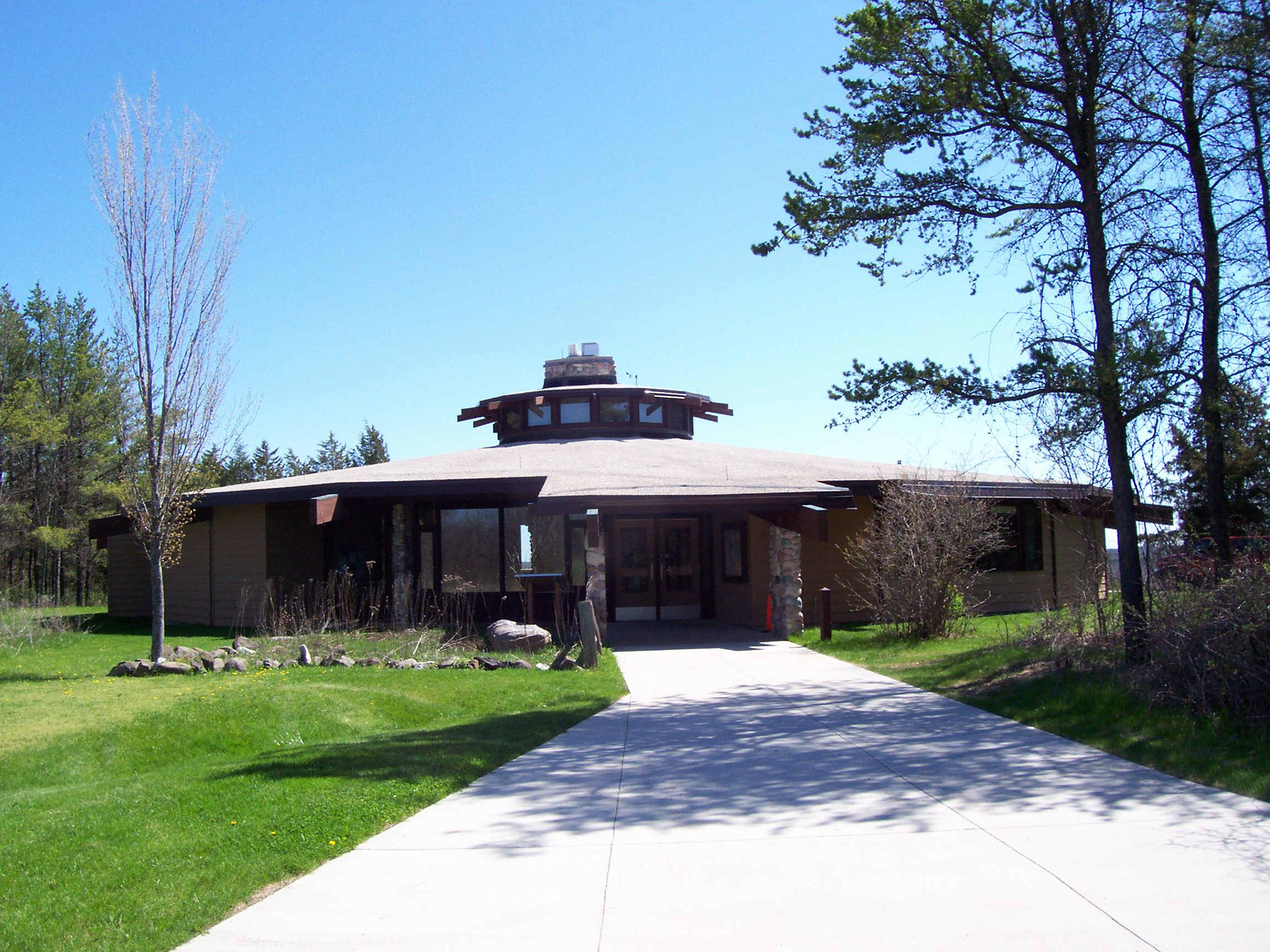
Reuss Ice Age Visitor Center

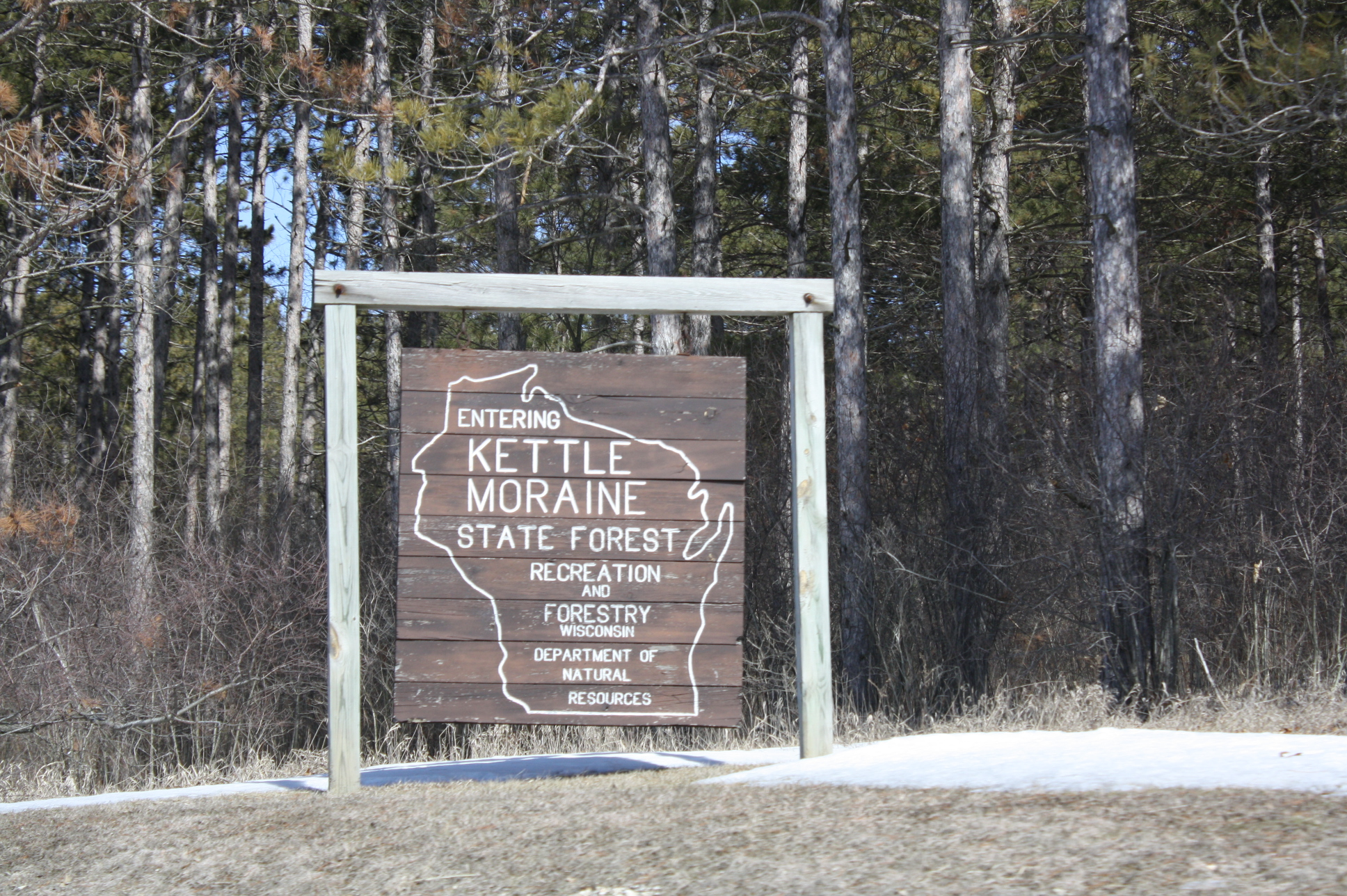
Sign entering southern unit

The Kettle Moraine State Forest is a state forest in southeastern Wisconsin. The chief feature of the reserve is the Kettle Moraine, a highly glaciated area. The area contains very hilly terrain and glacial landforms, such as kettles, kames and eskers. The 56,000-acre (23,000 ha) forest is divided into two large and three small units, which are spread across a hundred miles.

The forest includes 250 miles (400 km) of hiking trails, almost 100 miles (160 km) of cross-country ski trails, 130 miles (210 km) of equestrian trails, 150 miles (240 km) of snowmobile trails, 75 miles (121 km) of off-road bicycle trails including 30 miles (48 km) of singletrack trail, and 750 campsites.

All units include a portion of the Ice Age National Scenic Trail and most units have horse/snowmobile trails. Several areas of trail loops for hiking, biking and skiing can be found in the northern and southern units.

The Kettle Moraine Scenic Drive is a 115-mile (185 km) scenic route that winds across southeastern Wisconsin, and through all five forest units.

== Cultural and community events ==
Kettle Moraine State Forest hosts a variety of cultural and community events throughout the year, fostering a deep connection between visitors and the natural environment. These events, often organized in collaboration with local organizations and volunteer groups, cater to diverse interests and promote environmental education, outdoor recreation, and community engagement.

• Candlelight Hike/Ski Events: During the winter months, the forest offers candlelight hike and ski events, where trails are illuminated. Participants can enjoy the quiet appeal of the forest under the stars, often accompanied by some heated refreshments and bonfires.

• Educational Programs: The forest's nature centers, such as the Hausmann Nature Center, host educational programs and workshops. Topics range from local wildlife and plant identification to the history of Native American inhabitants in the Kettle Moraine area. These programs often feature expert speakers and hands-on activities, enhancing visitors’ understanding and appreciation of the region's natural and cultural heritage.

Volunteer Opportunities: Community involvement is encouraged through volunteer programs focused on trail maintenance, habitat restoration, and educational outreach. Organizations such as the Friends of Lapham Peak Unit play a crucial role in organizing these efforts, fostering a sense of stewardship and community among participants.

== Forest units ==
- The Northern Unit is located in western Sheboygan County, southeastern Fond du Lac County and northern Washington County. It is over twenty miles (32 km) long, and extends from just outside Glenbeulah, on the north end, southward to just east of Kewaskum. The Forest Headquarters is located in Campbellsport. Features of the Northern Unit are Greenbush Recreation Area, with a group camping area and hiking trails; Parnell Observation Tower; Long Lake Recreation Area, with a campground, a beach and boat launch; Henry S. Reuss Ice Age Visitor Center; Spruce Lake Bog; Saint John Evangelical Lutheran Church; and Mauthe Lake Recreation Area, with a campground.
- The Southern Unit extends from just west of North Prairie. It is southwest of Whitewater Lake, and south of Whitewater. Other nearby towns include Eagle and Palmyra. Features of the Southern Unit include Ottawa Lake Recreation Area which has boating, campgrounds and hiking and ski trails, and Whitewater Lake Recreation Area, which also features camping and boating. The Forest is host to Old World Wisconsin, a collection of farmsteads, recreating the homes and lives of settlers, and also to the McMiller Sportsmen Center, public hunting practice ranges.
- The Pike Lake Unit is on the eastern side of 446-acre (1.80 km^{2}) Pike Lake. It is located on state Highway 60 in between Slinger and Hartford. The park offers camping, hiking, biking and swimming, and has an observation tower overlooking the park and lake.
- The Loew Lake Unit is a small recreation area located in the town of Erin, on the Oconomowoc River and Loews Lake in southwestern Washington County. It offers hiking, hunting and horse riding.
- Lapham Peak Unit is south of Delafield in Waukesha County. It has over 20 miles (32 km) of trails, and an observation tower.
- The Mukwonago River Unit is in Waukesha and Walworth Counties, adjacent to the Mukwonago River.
