= Gruenke =

Gruenke may refer to:

- R v Gruenke, a leading Supreme Court of Canada case on privileged communications
- Bernard Gruenke, American stained glass artist
- B. Gunar Gruenke, American stained glass artist and grandson of the above

== See also ==
- Grünkern
