= Battle of Cockpit Point =

Battle of the American Civil War

Coordinates: 38.5586°N 77.2642°W

- Part of the American Civil War
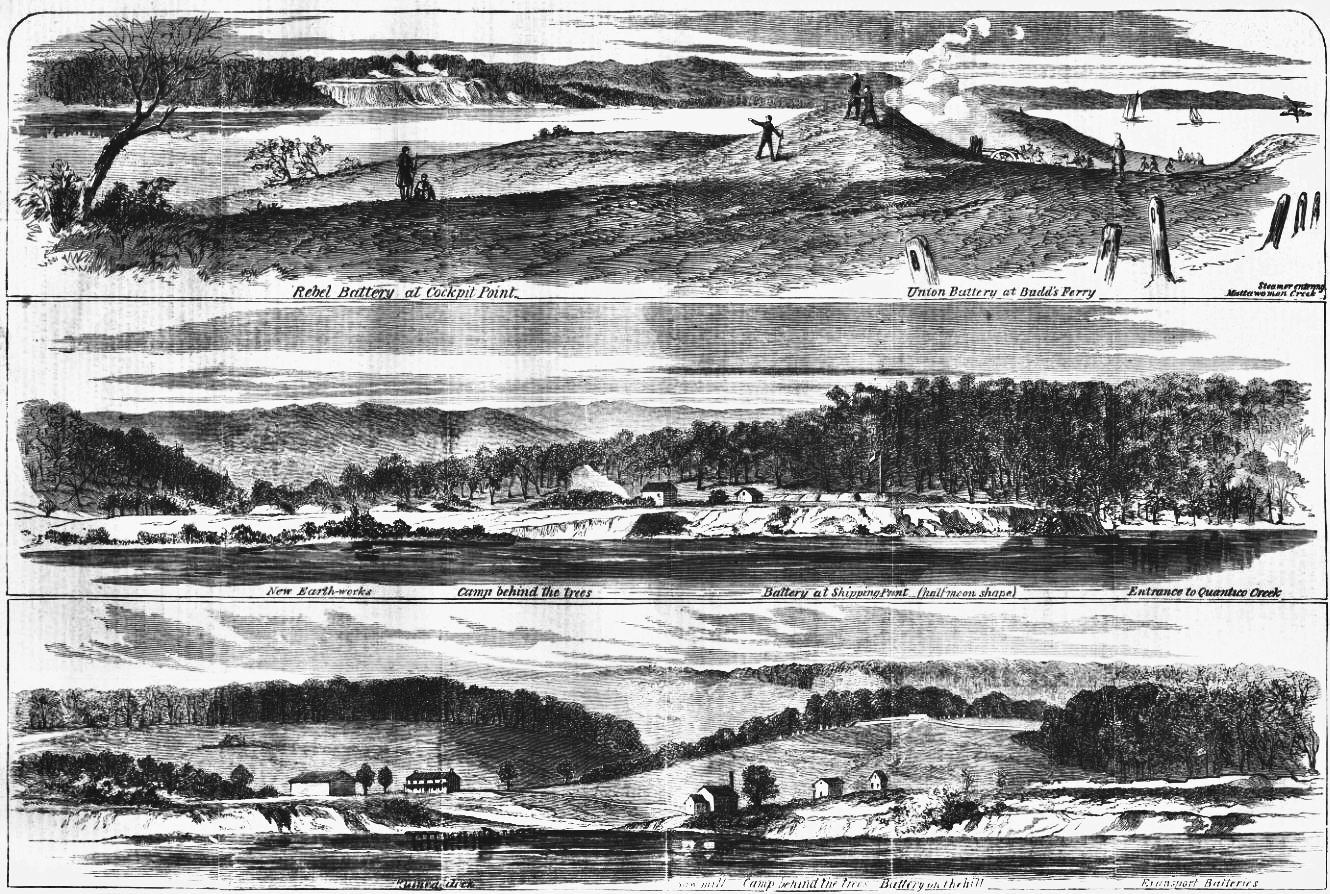
- The rebel batteries on the Potomac now in possession of our troops. A sketch from 1862 by Harper's Weekly showing the aftermath of the engagement at Cockpit Point.
Date	January 3, 1862
Location	Prince William County, Virginia
Result	Inconclusive

Belligerents
United States	Confederate States

Commanders and leaders
(United States Navy) Robert H. Wyman	(Confederate States of America) Samuel G. French

Strength
2 gunboats	50 men 4 batteries

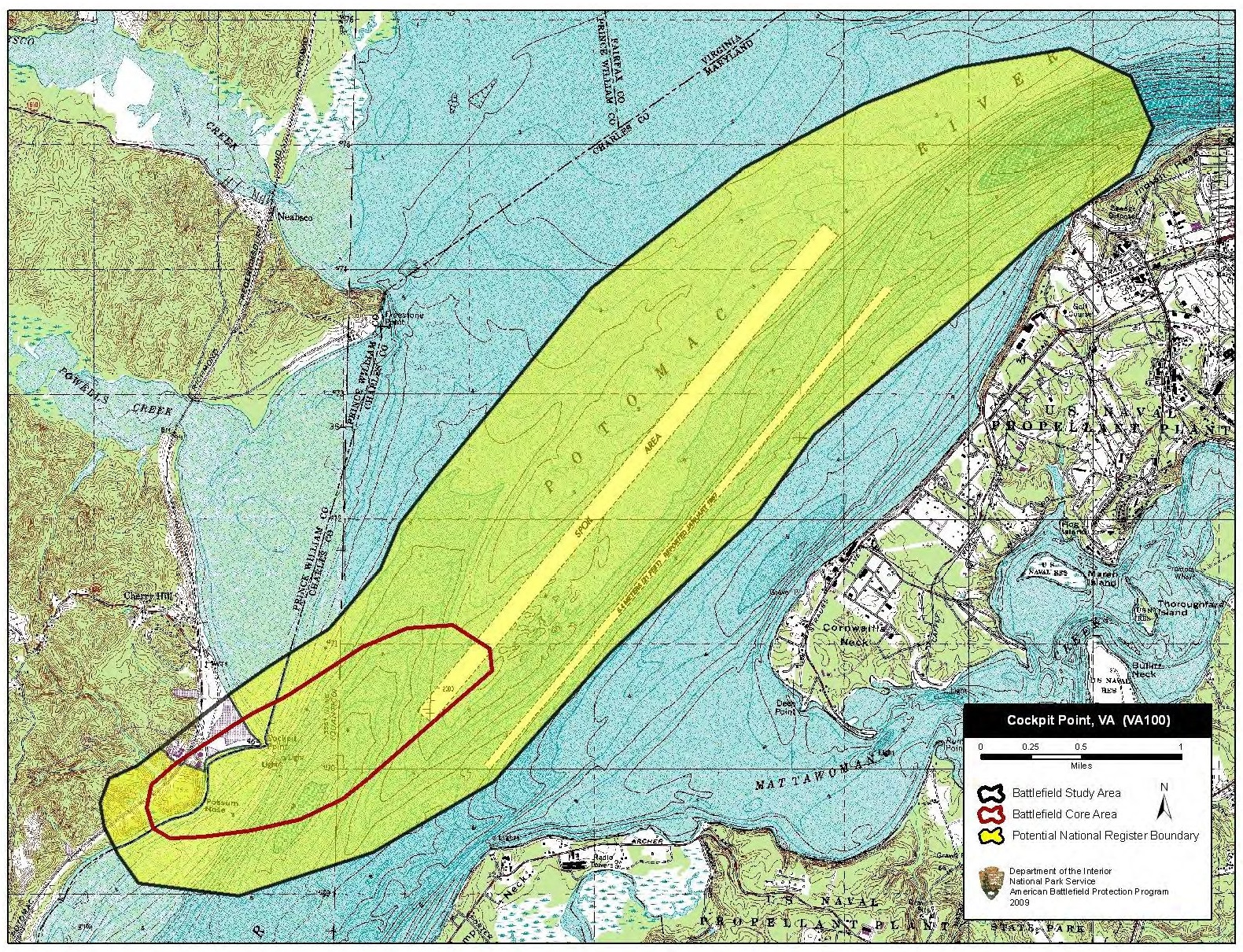
Map of Cockpit Point Battlefield core and study areas by the American Battlefield Protection Program.

The Battle of Cockpit Point, the Battle of Freestone Point, or the Battle of Shipping Point, took place on January 3, 1862, in Prince William County, Virginia, as part of the blockade of the Potomac River during the American Civil War.

After victory at First Battle of Bull Run, the Confederate States Army (CSA) established a defensive line from Centreville along the Occoquan River to the Potomac River. The Confederates used the Potomac's banks as gun positions to halt Union traffic on the river, protecting Manassas Junction to the west and Fredericksburg to the south and to close the Potomac River to shipping and isolate Washington.

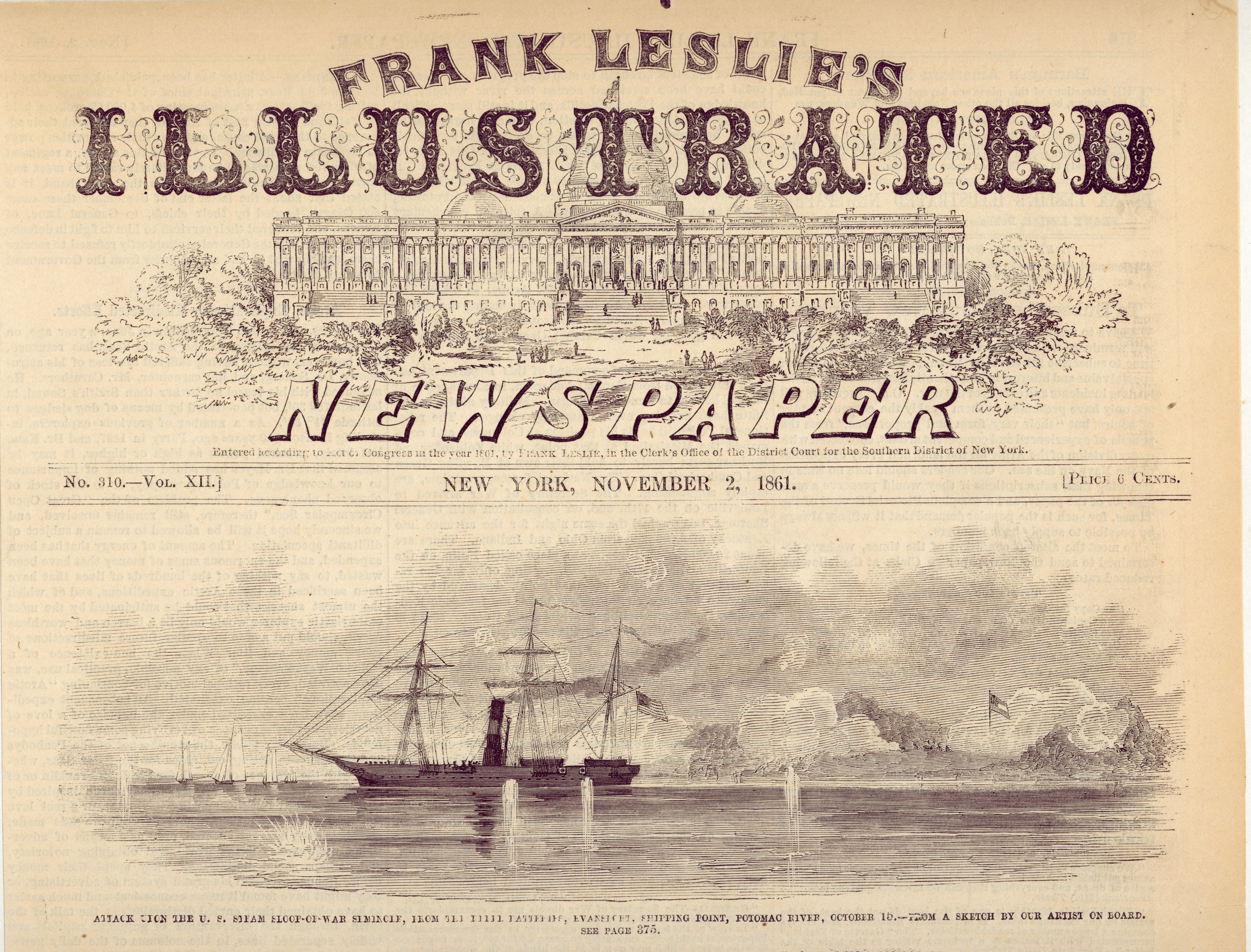
Attack on the U. S. Steam Sloop-of-War Seminole, from the field batteries, Evansport, Shipping Point, Potomac River, 15 October

In October 1861, the Confederates constructed batteries at Evansport (now downtown Quantico), which consisted of two batteries on the river bank, and another 400 yd (370 m) inland, a CSA field battery located at the mouth of Chopawamsic Creek where it empties to the Potomac (now the Marine Corps Air Facility), Shipping Point (now Hospital Point on Quantico), number of guns unknown, Freestone Point, a CSA four-gun battery on the shore of the Potomac River, (now within Leesylvania State Park), and Cockpit Point (near the current asphalt plant), which consisted of six guns (one heavy gun) in four batteries, a powder magazine, and rear rifle pits, on top of a 75 ft (23 m) high cliff known as Possum Nose. By mid-December, the Confederates had 37 heavy guns in position along the river.

On September 25, 1861, the Freestone Point batteries were shelled by the USS Jacob Bell (commanded by Lieutenant Edward P. McCrea) and Seminole, commanded by Lieutenant Charles S. Norton. On January 1, 1862, Cockpit Point was shelled by Anacostia (Lieutenant Oscar C. Badger commanding) and Yankee (Lieutenant Eastman commanding), with neither side gaining an advantage, though Yankee was slightly damaged.

Union ships approached the point again on March 9. A landing party from Anacostia and Yankee destroyed abandoned Confederate batteries at Cockpit Point and Evansport, Virginia, and found CSS Page blown up. The Confederates, in keeping with their general tactic of withdrawal from the sea coast and coastal islands, had abandoned their works and retired closer to Richmond, after effectively sealing off the Potomac River for nearly five months.

== Legacy ==
Prince William County is in the process of establishing the Cockpit Point Battlefield Heritage Park at Cockpit Point to open in 2017. The park will preserve 113 acres, including a 93-acre natural area with a pond. The park area has a 16-acre gun battery site along the Potomac River, including cannon emplacements.
