= Confederate Medal of Honor =

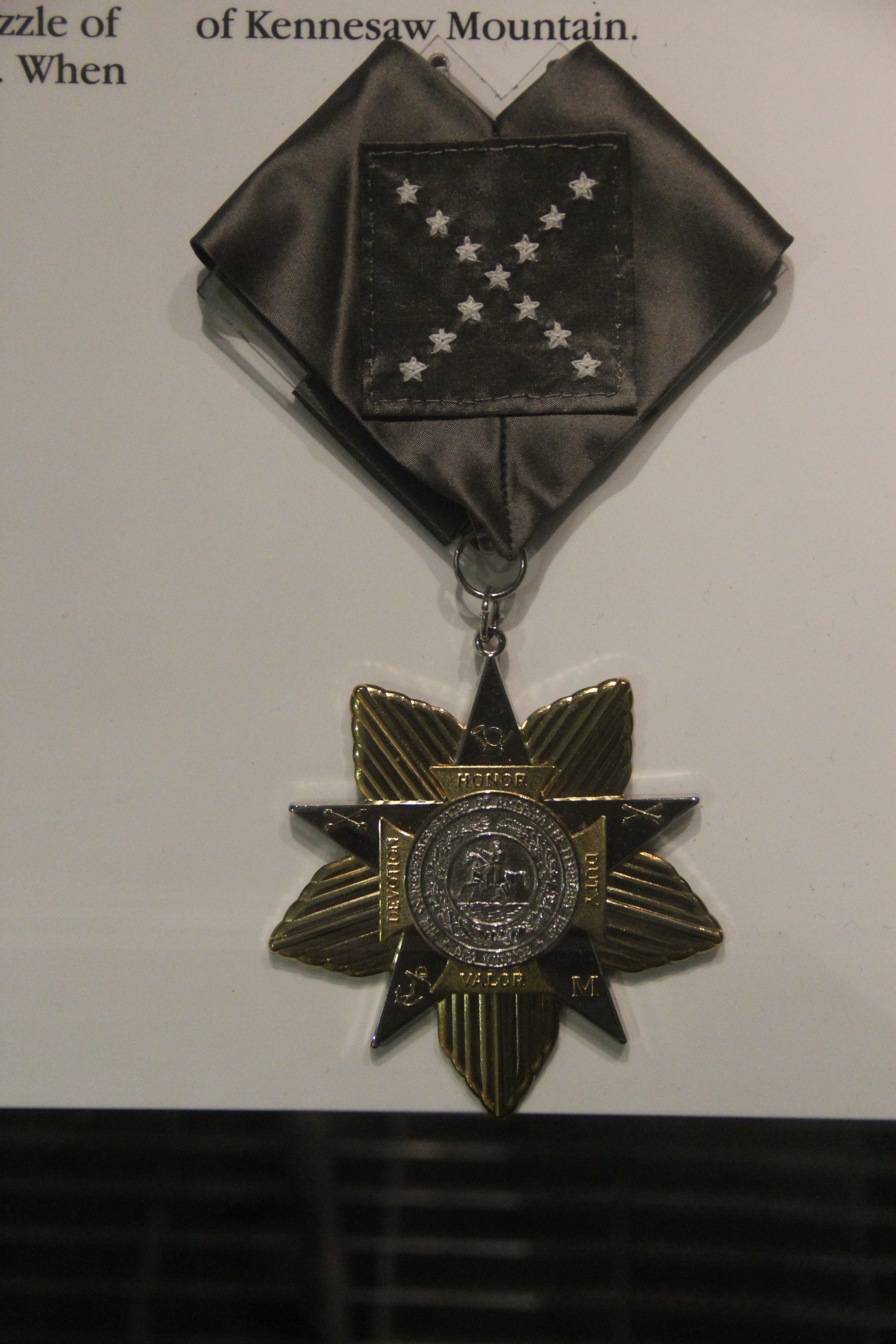
- Awarded for: Conspicuous "gallantry, bravery, and intrepidity at the risk of life, above and beyond the call of duty" during the American Civil War
- Date: 1977; 49 years ago
- Presented by: Commander-in-Chief of the Sons of Confederate Veterans

The Confederate Medal of Honor is a posthumous award created by the Sons of Confederate Veterans (SCV) in 1977 to recognize Confederate veterans who "distinguished themselves conspicuously by gallantry, bravery, and intrepidity at the risk of life, above and beyond the call of duty" during the American Civil War.

== Background ==
During the American Civil War, the Confederate States Congress authorized President Jefferson Davis to "bestow medals, with proper devices, upon such officers of the armies of the Confederate States as shall be conspicuous for courage and good conduct on the field of battle, and also to confer a badge of distinction upon one private or non-commissioned officer of each company after every signal victory it shall have assisted to achieve." Lacking adequate manufacturing capability, Adjutant and Inspector General Samuel Cooper belatedly established the "Roll of Honor" on October 3, 1863, in Richmond, Virginia.

== History ==
In 1968, the Sons of Confederate Veterans passed a resolution to issue a "medal of honor" and began minting them in 1977. According to past executive director Ben Sewell, "[t]he SCV created their own Confederate Medal of Honor simply because there were some incredible acts of valor that had received little or no recognition during and after the war". As of 2014, at least 50 medals had been awarded.

== Design ==
The Confederate Medal of Honor is bronze and silver, with two five-pointed stars overlain. Inscribed are the words "Honor. Duty. Valor. Devotion." In the center is the Great Seal of the Confederate States.

== Criteria ==
Recipients must be shown to have "distinguished themselves conspicuously by gallantry, bravery, and intrepidity at the risk of life, above and beyond the call of duty, while engaged in action against the enemy of the Confederate States of America." Most recommendations are derived from the Confederate Roll of Honor. Medals are provided to museums and libraries under a condition they properly display them.

== Notable recipients ==
- Father Emmeran M. Bliemel
- Commander Isaac Brown
- Private Sam Davis
- David Owen Dodd
- Major Richard W. Dowling
- Lieutenant-General Nathan Bedford Forrest
- Brigadier-General Wade Hampton
- Sergeant Richard Rowland Kirkland
- Captain John S. Mosby
- Major John Pelham
- Captain Henry Wirz

== See also ==
- Lists of awards
- Southern Cross of Honor
