= Church of the Assumption (Nashville, Tennessee) =

Historic Latin Catholic church

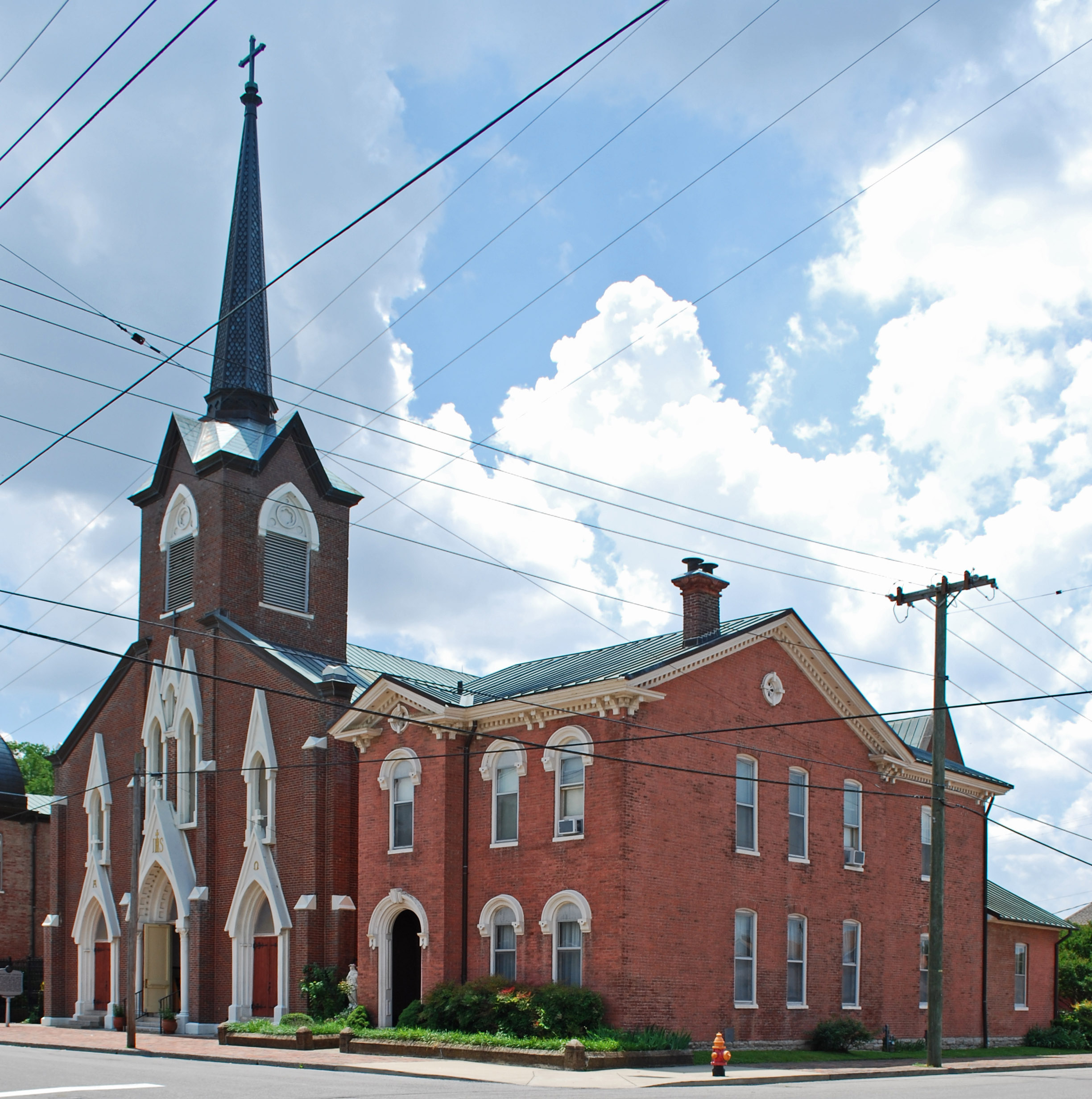
- The church and rectory in 2010
- Church of the Assumption
- 36°10′31″N 86°47′30″W
- Location: Nashville, Tennessee
- Address: 1227 7th Ave., N.
- Country: United States
- Denomination: Catholic Church
- Sui iuris church: Latin Church

History
- Status: Parish church
- Founded: 1858; 168 years ago
- Dedication: Assumption of Mary
- Dedicated: August 14, 1859

Architecture
- Heritage designation: National Register of Historic Places listed place
- Architect: Jacob Geiger
- Style: Neo-Gothic
- Groundbreaking: 1858
- Completed: 1859

Specifications
- Materials: Brick

Administration
- Province: Louisville
- Diocese: Nashville

Clergy
- Pastor: Father S. Bede Price
- Church of the Assumption
- U.S. National Register of Historic Places
- Area: less than one acre
- NRHP reference No.: 77001262
- Added to NRHP: August 22, 1977

The Church of the Assumption is a historic Catholic church of the Diocese of Nashville located in the Germantown neighborhood of Nashville, Tennessee. The church building was added to the National Register of Historic Places in 1977; both the church and the neighboring parochial school building and Buddeke-Byrne House form an integral part of the Germantown Historic District, also listed on the National Register of Historic Places.

== Early history ==
=== Construction and the Civil War ===
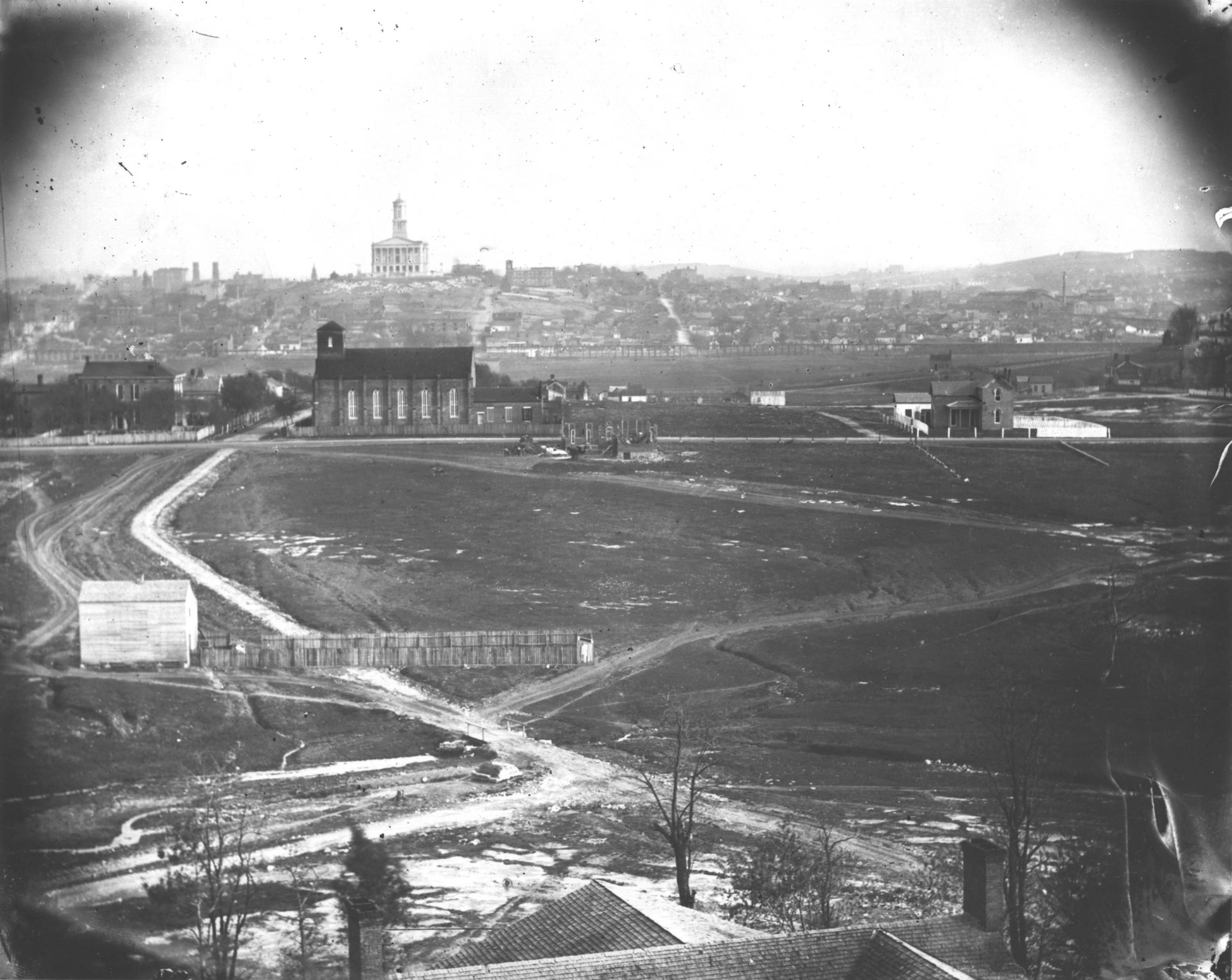
View of Nashville, ca. 1880

A full-page advertisement in the Nashville Tennessean (now The Tennessean) describes what was then known as North Nashville as "away out in the country" with "cow paths and lanes" that went through "woods and fields." German immigrants arrived in Nashville in the 1830s and 40s, owing to increased political turmoil. Assumption's future benefactors the Buddekes, the Rattermans (relatives of the Buddekes), and the Wessels arrived in Nashville ca. 1835, then in 1842 and 1843 respectively. J.H. Buddeke moved to North Nashville after operating a successful grocery, whiskey, and real estate business.

German Catholics felt alienated from the Irish at Saint Mary’s, then the cathedral, and they gathered in the Buddeke family mansion for Mass, eventually drawing Germans from all across the city to form a major community in the same neighborhood. David McGavock sold a parcel with the requirement that the church be built within eighteen months, taking advantage of his own desire to sell land; this put the church at the forefront of growth north of downtown.

The church was built in 1858 using in part reclaimed bricks from Nashville's first Catholic church, Holy Rosary Cathedral, itself built in 1830 to replace an earlier timber structure. The cathedral was replaced in 1847 when Saint Mary of the Seven Sorrows was built on nearby 5th Avenue; at that time, it was converted to a hospital and orphanage before being sold to the state in 1857 for the construction of the Tennessee State Capitol. The former cathedral turned hospital was subsequently demolished, allowing for the bricks to be used for the construction of the new church. Father Ivo Schacht served as the first pastor. A mechanic's lien for $2,000 was placed on the church, but George Wessel, a parishioner, intervened at the auction, thereby saving the property.

The Church of the Assumption was dedicated with the rite of solemn blessing, as opposed to consecration, in 1859. For most of the following year, Father Innocent Bergrath, who was born in Rhenish Prussia, served as pastor following his ordination on 1860.

Father Emmeran Bliemel, also a German immigrant, came from Saint Vincent's Archabbey to serve the German immigrants of Nashville as the church's pastor, responding in the fall of 1860 to an invitation for priests from Bishop James Whelan, second bishop of Nashville, at some point replacing Father Bergrath. The outbreak of the Civil War and the secession of Tennessee in June 1861 led to the dispersal of parishioners, including of men for service in the Confederate forces, caused financial difficulties for the remaining parishioners. Father Bliemel continued to minister not only to his own dwindling congregation but to Federal troops in Nashville, arriving after the city was captured in 1862, despite his open support of the Confederate cause; he was accused of smuggling medical supplies to the Confederates and was finally caught with morphine in his possession. Bishop Whelan requested that Father Bliemel move to Saint Mary's, then the cathedral. He lived with the bishop at the residence located at Cedar and Somer Streets from where he could also serve Assumption.

As the war in the west continued to rage, Union troops pillaged and then took over the church in the summer of 1863 with Nashville serving as the largest western supply depot and medical center for the Federal forces. Father Bliemel's male parishioners had essentially all left to join the Confderate army; he had repeatedly asked permission to join the men in the field, even being elected chaplain of the 10th Tennessee Infantry Regiment, the "Bloody Tenth" primarily formed of Irishmen from Nashville before Father Bliemel received permission to serve. He joined the unit only after news of the Battle of Chickamauga reached Nashville and his superiors gave Father Bliemel permission to join the regiment. Father Bliemel died during the Battle of Jonesborough on August 31, 1864, becoming the first American chaplain killed in action when struck in the head by a projectile as he gave absolution to the regiment's colonel, William Grace. As of 2025, the church's green space is named in the priest's honor.

=== After the Civil War to the Golden Jubilee ===
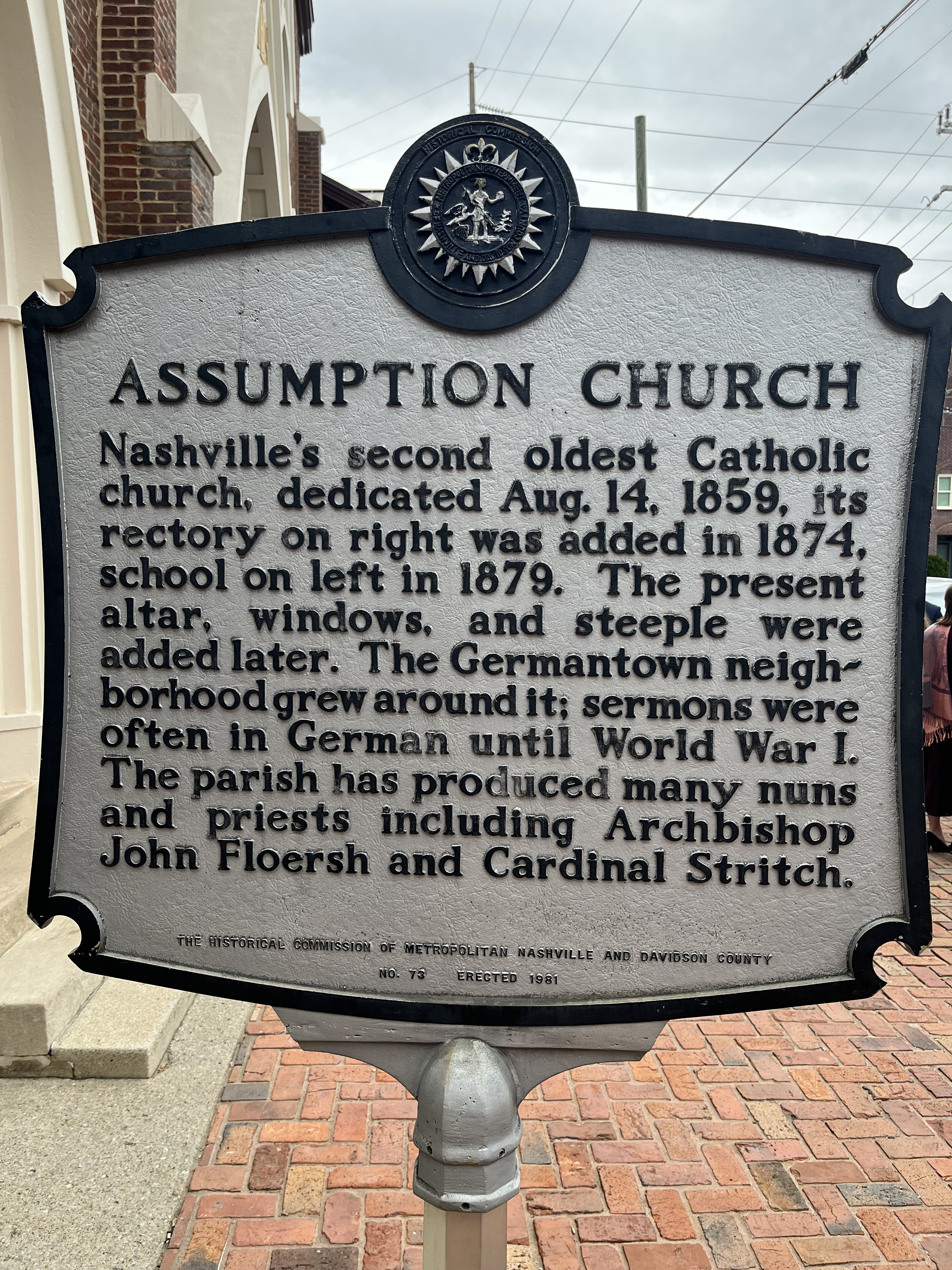
Assumption Church Historical Marker, 7th Ave North, Nashville TN

The church in its early years had a precarious existence according to a newspaper report of its fiftieth-anniversary celebration in 1909, and its pastors were not always an exception. In the immediate period after the Civil War, pastors came and went. Fathers N.J. Konen and L. Schneider ministered following Father Bliemel's departure during the Civil War until 1867, to be replaced by Father W.J. Revis, who departed in turn in 1871. At that time, the parish was staffed by the Missionaries of the Precious Blood; Father Philip Rist took charge in 1871, only to be replaced in 1873 by Father Joseph Uphaus, who was responsible for the construction of the rectory in 1874. A school followed in 1879 during Father Mathias Kenk’s term as pastor.

In 1882 Father Clement Roesener served as pastor until his death in 1887, having previously served as assistant pastor and chaplain to the Dominican Sisters of Saint Cecilia. At that time Father Uphaus returned to Nashville, where he served for another ten years at Assumption. After his departure for Indiana, Father W.P. Shirack took over the care of the parish where he served for three years.

Despite the rural character of the land even after the Civil War, Nashville's German community, desirous of maintaining German life and customs, established commercial activity, particularly butcher shops, spoke German frequently, and maintained German fraternal organizations even before the Civil War. German societies continued to be active in the community into the 1870s and beyond, including a new organization co-founded by benefactor J.H. Buddeke in 1872.

Cardinal Samuel Stritch, later archbishop of Chicago and the first American to head a dicastery of the Roman Curia, was baptized at the Church of the Assumption; a historical marker on 7th Ave. outside of the church commemorates him as well as Archbishop John Floersh, bishop and later the first archbishop of the Archdiocese of Louisville from 1924 until his retirement in 1967.

All of Nashville's Catholics were called to participate in two processions in June 1900 for the Jubillee called that year by Pope Leo XIII, and the parish hosted a station on both occasions.

== 20th Century ==
=== Golden Jubilee to the Centennial ===
The parish again found some stability when Father Henry Japes, regarded as one of the small diocese’s most popular priests, became pastor after the turn of the century. During his ministry, significant improvements were made in 1906 including the installation of the pews and oak floors, five hundred electric lights along the arches lit up for major occasions, memorial windows, all remaining in the church more than a century later, along with a since-replaced chapel for smaller services. The choir loft was expanded and decorated, the vestibule expanded, and two arches installed along the east-west axis to replace doors. A statue of Saint Anne believed to be the only one in this region of the South was placed near an altar in a prominent location. The newspaper makes record of the organ fund, and an instrument was installed around this time.

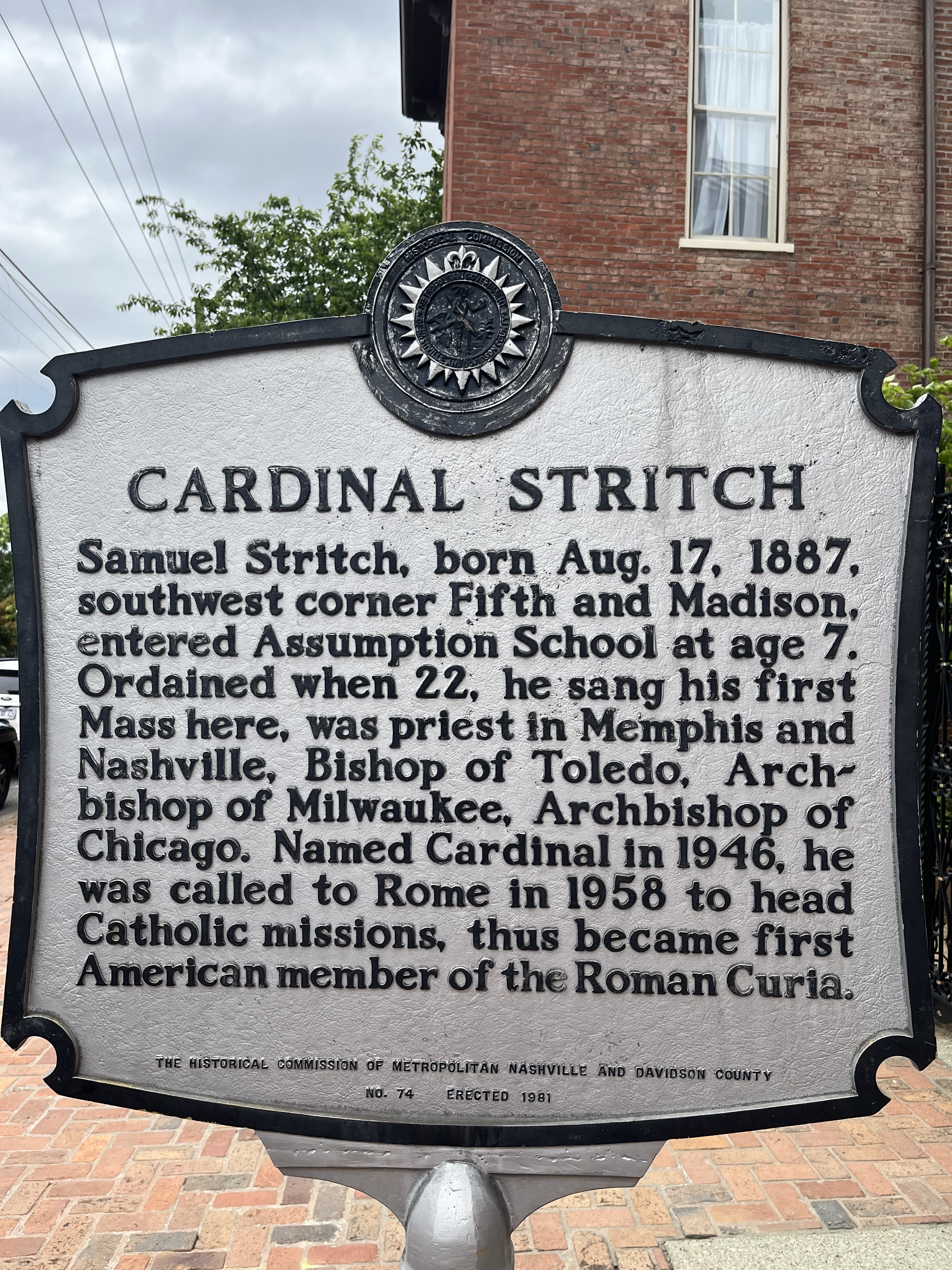
Cardinal Stritch Historical Marker, 7th Ave North, Nashville TN

The church marked its golden jubilee with a pontifical high Mass celebrated by Bishop Thomas Byrne and a sermon delivered by Father John Larkin on the theme of the feast day, followed by Vespers. In this period, the church became known for preaching to Catholics on themes that set them apart from their Protestant neighbors, such as the Assumption of Mary as well as making serious efforts to host lectures from intellectually minded clerics such as Paulist priests in a way that would attract Protestant listeners. The jubilee preacher, Father Larkin, considered Assumption to be "worthy of any city", even as the diocese, covering the entire state, only had 20,000 Catholics total. In 1910, the future cardinal, Samuel Stritch, returned from Europe to celebrate a first solemn high Mass in the church; Father Japes gave the sermon before his former parishioner.

The pastor retired in 1914 before dying at the age of ninety-five in the spring of 1915, after over fifty years of ministry; for the funeral the bishop celebrated a solemn Requiem Mass at the church.

From 1915 to 1919, Franciscan friars served the parish; they immediately set to renovate the parish under a certain Father Odilo. By the time that the works were completed in the spring or early summer of 1916, the pulpit was removed, having been present however for the Golden Jubille of 1909. A mural of Saint Francis of Assisi receiving the stigmata was installed at that time. German communities faced pressure to integrate due to World War I; Assumption was no exception, and the German language disappeared; one service per Sunday was celebrated with German as the vernacular language during the childhood of Cardinal Stritch as he recalled in 1958. The parish returned to diocesan hands under the care of Father Edward Desmond; he served in his capacity as pastor as a diocesan delegate to the episcopal consecration of then-Bishop Stritch, the youngest American bishop at the time.

The church maintained at various points several thriving organizations for parishioners such as a youth guild active notably at the turn of the century and a chapter of the Confraternity of Christian Mothers first organized by Father Charles Schleuter, active particularly in the 1910s and 1920s alongside the Holy Name Society. Social gatherings like picnics occurred on a regular basis, including an annual Labor Day picnic which continued as late as 1961. The revived Confraternity of Christian Mothers celebrated its 75th anniversary with a Mass celebrated by Bishop James Daniel Niedergeses during Oktoberfest in 1989.

The Diocese of Nashville covered the entire state until the erection of the Diocese of Memphis in 1970, resulting in pastors who had geographically divided duties as far away as Memphis; in 1937, Father Joseph Cunningham was appointed pastor of Assumption as well as administrator of Immaculate Conception in Memphis being transferred to full-time ministry in West Tennessee. Father Aaron Gildea became pastor around the time of the transfer of his predecessor to Memphis, serving for over a decade.

The church's first steeple collapsed during a storm in the 1940s and was removed in 1950; its forty-feet tall replacement with an aluminum frame and copper shingles went up in October 1984.

Following Father Gildea's transfer to the nascent Saint Edward's parish south of the city in 1951, Father (later Monsignor) Dan Richardson became pastor; he fostered close relationships with the community, including altar boys who lost their fathers at young ages. Priest and social activist Charles Strobel grew up in the parish, where he served as an altar boy at Father Richardson's Masses, attending the parochial school from first through eighth grade. During Strobel's childhood in the late 1940s and early 1950s, the parish was segregated; black families from the same neighborhood attended services at Saint Vincent de Paul, on Heiman Street near Fisk University. The priest turned activist was ordained in the church in 1970 and as of 1982 was the most recently ordained priest out of approximately twelve ordinands in the church's history. Strobel's brother Martin Jerome "Jerry" Strobel also grew up in the parish community; he became known locally for his professional life as manager of the Grand Ole Opry House, including the development of Fan Fest, now CMA Fest, and for musical service at Catholics parishes throughout Middle Tennessee.

The church marked its centennial with three days of Masses in particular those presided at by Bishop William Adrian of Nashville and celebrated by Archbishop Floersh; at some point before this, the walls of the church were painted in a solid color, covering up the murals behind the high altar.

=== "Father Bernard" and Sparks of Revival ===
Trouble came for the church building itself in the 1960s. A fire, perhaps arson, caused smoke damage throughout the building in 1964. Structural repairs coupled with a dwindling number of parishioners due to migration to other parts of the Nashville metropolitan area led to a proposal to close the church in 1968. In 1955 Bishop Adrian had erected a mission named for the recently canonized pope Saint Pius X in the Bordeaux neighborhood of Nashville north of the Cumberland River; at that time, approximately a quarter of the parish now lived outside of the Germantown neighborhood, necessitating a school as well. The school opened in 1960, and in 1961, Father Richardson continued his ministry as the first pastor of the newly erected parish, while Msgr. George Flanigen came to Nashville from Chattanooga, returning as editor of the diocesan newspaper the Tennessee Register which he had founded in 1937 as well serving as pastor of Assumption. The parochial school closed in the middle of the 1961–1962 school year; the students enrolled at Saint Pius X.

Msgr. William "Floyd" Davis then served as administrator and later pastor of the church before incardinating in the newly erected diocese of Memphis. In 2018, he was named as a part of a list of clerics and other religious serving in the Nashville diocese who were at one point accused of sexually abusing minors; all persons were investigated, with the files turned over to the Davidson County District Attorney's Office according to the diocese, which did not indicate whether all allegations were deemed credible. However, the Diocese of Memphis named the priest in a list of priests credibly accused of abusing minors; it is unclear whether the priest was accused of abuse only during his service in the new diocese or also in service in Nashville, including in territory now belonging to the Diocese of Knoxville erected by Pope John Paul II in 1988 to cover the eastern part of the state.

The local organization of Catholic Charities claims to have received the first grant in metropolitan Nashville from the Office of Economic Opportunity. The funds established the Seventh Avenue Education Center, which opened in the spring of 1966, making use of the former parochial school building, staffed by trained teachers, dietary staff, and social workers; one priest, Father Leo Siener, founding director of Catholic Charities of Tennessee, served as executive director. The year-round center was open to children of all backgrounds with only nominal weekly tuition.

Msgr. W. Bernard Niedegeses, often known as "Father Bernard", became pastor of Assumption in 1970, serving until his retirement in 2008. The priest fought attempts to close the church, although he did not always reside at the church, simultaneously serving as pastor of Saint Pius X; a lay coordinator was appointed at Assumption in the mid-1980s by Bishop Niedegeses. The pastor nevertheless personally contributed carpentry and other manual labor to the restoration of the church, having grown up the son of a carpenter and woodworker in Lawrenceburg, Tennessee, learning from his father and brother. Under Msgr. Niedegeses's watch, the parish restored the bells, making the ringing electronic so that they could ring for the Angelus even in the morning. This marked a change from his predecessor, Msgr. Davis, where the bells could be rung as desired, they were rung only on Christmas and Easter. The parish undertook tuckpointing and window-restoration projects, as well as an initial restoration of the visible murals. Despite a hopeful tone on the part of the staff and success in maintenance and major works, the parish counted only 100 members in 1984.

In 1980, Msgr. Niedegeses and Jerry Strobel established an Oktoberfest festival with other local organizations with the goal of rebuilding the Germantown neighborhood, supporting the needy, and restoring the church as well as Monroe Street United Methodist Church located across the street. Joseph Seigenthaler created statues of the Holy Family, his only religious works, which were installed on the parish grounds as a part of the festivities in 1989. The two church communities had previously committed to at least two ecumenical services per year, beginning in 1980.

Cardinal Tarcisio Bertone presented the priest with a papal medal during the prelate's visit to Nashville.

In 1995, the parish acquired the Wm. Johnson op. 819 pipe organ, installed in 1895 for the Church of Christ of Valparaiso, Indiana, having been exhibited at the World's Columbian Exposition, then electrified and renovated in 1956 by the Toledo Pipe Organ Co. The instrument was installed in the church and renovated by the Milnar Organ Company.

== Early 21st Century ==
The Diocese of Nashville transferred ownership from the person of the bishop to the Church of the Assumption as a legal entity in 2004, as sex abuse cases in the United States within the Catholic Church became more publicly known and lawsuits were filed against dioceses and other Catholic institutions. This move belatedly complied with a 1911 directive of the Holy See to incorporate individual parishes, not holding the bishop or the as the sole owner.

In 2000, the former parochial school converted into the church hall was named in honor of Msgr. Niedegeses; he retired in 2008, succeeded by Father Michael d'Souza from India, where he returned in 2014. Father Jerry Strange became pastor, replaced by Father William Fitzgerald of the Norbertines as parish administrator. This priest assured celebrations of the Traditional Latin Mass. This form of worship resumed in 2015, in addition to the English post-Vatican II Mass. These celebrations continued to be officially sanctioned by the diocese as of October 2024. The church also hosts the Saint Teresa of Calcutta Syro-Malabar Catholic Mission of Nashville founded in 2008.

Father S. Bede Price was appointed as the thirty-fifth pastor of the Church of the Assumption in June 2019 and installed by Bishop J. Mark Spalding on the feast of the Assumption, August 15. The pastor founded a new altar server’s confraternity affiliated with the Guild of Saint Stephen as well as a girl’s organization dedicated to Mary on the model of the Children of Mary sodalities of the nineteenth century. The parish also offers religious education featuring the Catechesis of the Good Shepherd. A novena before the feast of the Assumption was instituted as the priest believed that many Nashville Catholics had a connection to the parish, and he hoped to draw them back to the church via this series of prayers modeled on other novenas in major Catholic communities in the United States. During Father Price’s service as pastor, the parish’s congregation was primarily composed of those driving to the parish for the Traditional Latin Mass; the parish received international attention in the wake of restrictions put in place by Pope Francis in his document Traditionis custodes.

=== Tornado and restoration ===
On March 3, 2020, the church was struck by a tornado, compromising the building's structural integrity. An extensive, multi-year restoration project subsequently began, firstly to repair and secure the building, as the tornado severely damaged the roof and the northern and western walls. All decorative elements were removed until these repairs were sufficiently completed. Further delays were caused by the COVID-19 pandemic. During this time, services were split between temporary chapels erected in the former school building and in the Buddeke-Byrne House, before being held exclusively in the latter chapel. Parishioners and visitors described the chapel's capacity as approximately three times smaller than the church and noted that its poor acoustics and the number of small children meant that the sermon was hard to hear. During this period when the church and baptismal font were unusable, a punch bowl previously owned by Lamar Alexander, former governor of the state, was repurposed for baptisms. Other services were occasionally held outside in the church's park, notably the station during the nationwide series of processions of the Eucharist ending in Indianapolis, site of the 2024 National Eucharistic Congress, the first held in the United States in a century.

The repair project cost approximately six million dollars, covered by insurance, with another 1.5 million for artistic restoration covered by a diocesan loan to be repaid through fundraising. A steel tie-rod system was installed to support the original timbers of the roof in addition to masonry work.

In December 2021, a relic of Saint Roch given to the parish by Cardinal Raymond Burke was placed in the steeple when it was placed anew on top of the church; the second steeple installed by Monsignor Niedegeses includes the original cross, blessed by Bishop Spalding, from the first steeple; the relic was sealed inside the base of the cross at that time. The project was on track as of December 2021 to be completed sometime before January 2023, but ultimately was completed in March 2025.

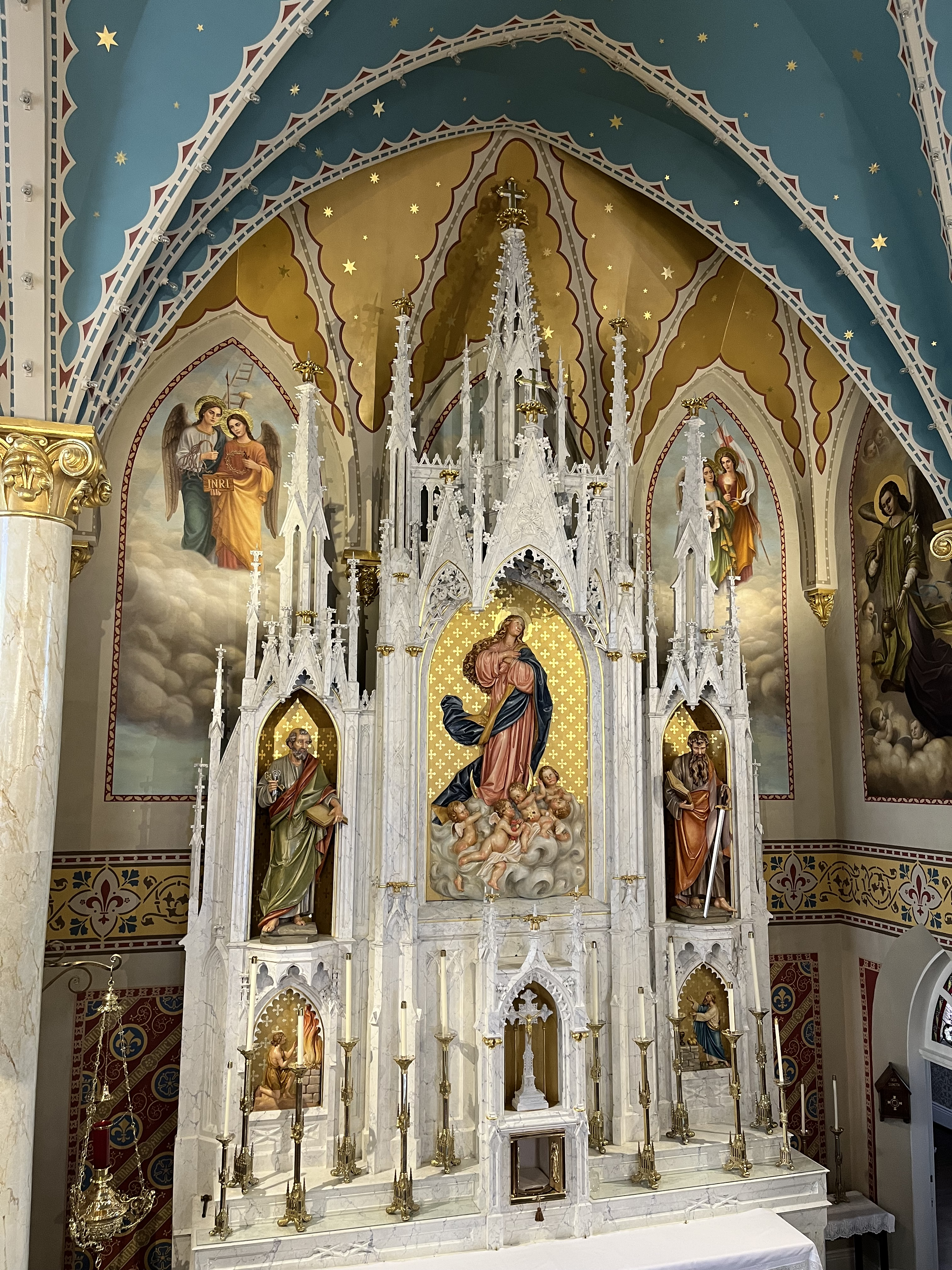
High altar of Assumption Church, with image of Our Lady of the Assumption.

The church’s plasterwork was entirely replaced as a part of the project’s second phase. A team from Conrad Schmitt Studios executed the artistic work including restoration of painting, installation of new pieces, and the repair or replacement of damaged stained-glass windows. Stenciling added to the church but painted over or subsequently hidden by furniture in the church was uncovered and copied along the nave wall before being painted in a new color scheme. A different stenciling pattern inspired by late nineteenth-century German neo-Gothic examples found in historical photographs of the church was applied to the area around the church's three altars and newly installed shrines to Saint Roch and Saint Anthony of Padua. This artistic scheme replaced the white surfaces at the time of the tornado.

The ceiling was painted blue and covered with gold stars representing the heavens. The murals of the Ascension of Jesus and of the Assumption of Mary above the side altars were restored during this process, and Conrad Schmitt Studios' artists painted new murals based on historical examples painted over in the twentieth century. These images above the main altar and attached reredos depict angels and elements of the Passion of Jesus such as the veil of Veronica with the Holy Face of Jesus. The baptismal font was moved to its original location in the baptistry near the entrance and was elevated on a platform. Above the font is a new image of the Holy Spirit in the form of a dove. A pulpit modeled in part on the church's historical pulpit was also planned for and installed as a part of this restoration.

The church building reopened with a Mass celebrated by Bishop Spalding in the presence of Cardinal Burke on March 30, 2025.
