= B. Gunar Gruenke =

American artist

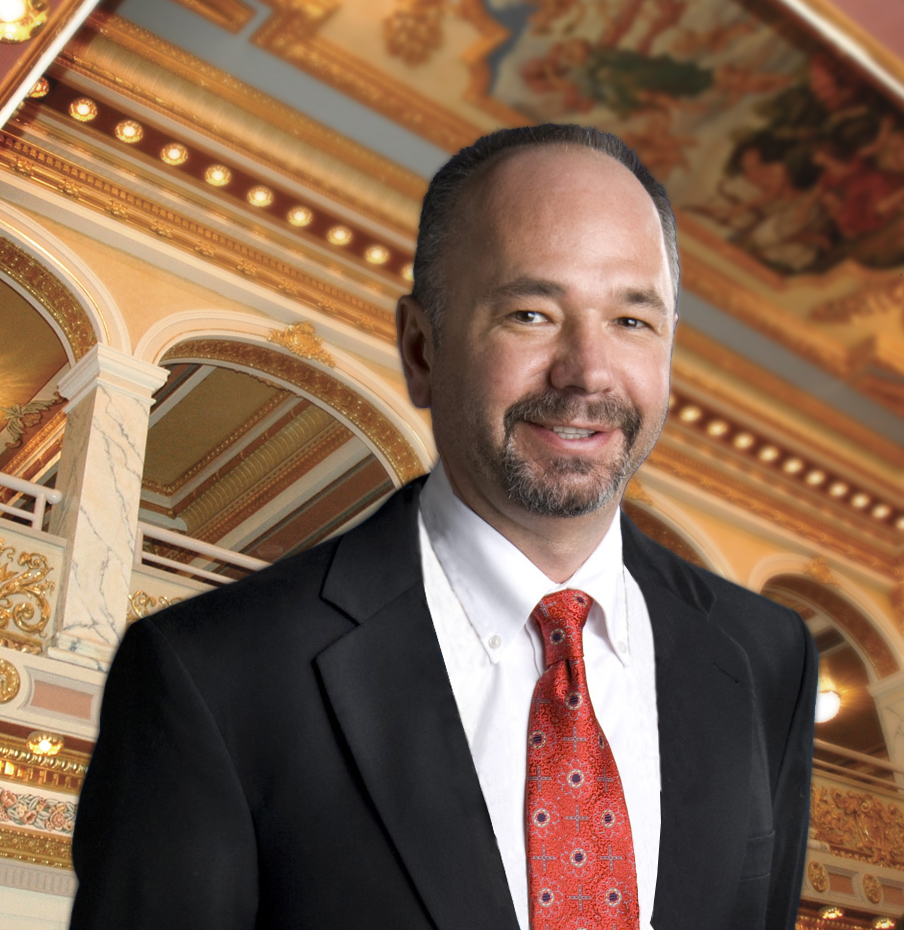
- Born: B. Gunar Gruenke
- Known for: Stained glass

B. Gunar Gruenke is a stained glass artist in Wisconsin.

== Early life ==
Gruenke was born and raised in Wisconsin. He grew up surrounded by artists and craftsmen creating and conserving stained glass and decorating America's historic buildings and sacred spaces. He began studying art at the age of seven, under the tutelage of his grandfather, Bernard O. Gruenke, his father, Bernard E. Gruenke, both nationally recognized ecclesiastical artists, and other artists. He studied business administration at the University of Wisconsin-Whitewater, graduating with a major in general business.

== Career ==
Gruenke has made his life's work to carry on the tradition his father and grandfather have passed down. He is the third generation owner and president of the Conrad Schmitt Studios based in New Berlin, Wisconsin. Established in 1889, the architectural arts studio is one of Milwaukee's pioneer businesses. It is one of the businesses shown in the Milwaukee Public Museum "Streets of Old Milwaukee" exhibit. Gruenke oversees studio operations, including managing and supervising, restoration and renovation projects, and coordinating all phases of the craft associated with architectural arts and decorative interior schemes.

The studio's collection of stained glass artwork is on display at the Smith Museum of Stained Glass Windows at Navy Pier in Chicago. The art studio specializes in the investigation and documentation of original decorative schemes, gilding, glazing, marbleizing, scagliola and stenciling as well as the new design, replication or conservation of stained glass and murals.

Gruenke served as the president of the Stained Glass Association of America (SGAA) from June 2007 to June 2009; a director of the SGAA Stained Glass School; a director of the Western Great Lakes Chapter of the Association for Preservation Technology (APT), and as an APT International Board Member. His contributions to the field of stained glass have garnered the Distinguished Service Award 2010 from the Stained Glass Association of America for the studio's work compiling, editing and implementing the "SGAA Recommendations for Safety in the Stained Glass Studio.”

== Gruenke Foundation for the Arts ==
Gruenke sits on the board of directors of the Gruenke Foundation for the Arts. This non-profit organization founded in 1996 is dedicated to arts education for the general public. The foundation' was established in 1991. It curates a collection of fine art that ranges from 1893 World's Trades Fair mosaics to a Giorgio Vasari painting from the early 16th century.

== Projects ==
Following is a partial list projects that Gruenke has supervised and managed:

- The Broadmoor resort, Colorado Springs, Colorado
- St. Mary's Cathedral, Colorado Springs, Colorado
- Warner Theatre - Lobby, Torrington, Connecticut
- Springer Opera House, Columbus, Georgia
- Hawaii Theatre, Honolulu, Hawaii
- Drake Hotel, Chicago, Illinois
- Roosevelt University – Ganz Hall, Chicago, Illinois
- St. Mary of the Angels Church, Chicago, Illinois
- Symphony Center - Orchestra Hall, Chicago, Illinois
- Paramount Theatre, Anderson, Indiana
- French Lick Springs Hotel, French Lick, Indiana
- St. Mary of the Immaculate Conception Cathedral, Lafayette, Indiana
- Basilica of the Sacred Heart, Notre Dame, Notre Dame, Indiana
- West Baden Springs Hotel, West Baden Springs, Indiana
- Union Passenger Terminal, New Orleans, Louisiana
- Citi Performing Arts Center - Wang Theatre, Boston, Massachusetts
- Colonial Theatre, Boston, Massachusetts
- Michigan Theatre, Ann Arbor, Michigan
- Temple Theatre, Saginaw, Michigan
- Gillioz Theatre, Springfield, Missouri
- St. Mary's Basilica, Natchez, Mississippi
- Federal Reserve Bank, Cleveland, Ohio
- Old Stone Church, Cleveland, Ohio
- East Broad Street Presbyterian Church, Columbus, Ohio
- Ohio Theatre, Columbus, Ohio
- Philadelphia City Hall, Philadelphia, Pennsylvania
- Sovereign Center - Rajah Theatre, Reading, Pennsylvania
- St. Mary's Catholic Church, Salem, South Dakota
- Paramount Theatre, Charlottesville, Virginia
- Mosque Theatre, Richmond, Virginia
- Al. Ringling Theatre, Baraboo, Wisconsin
- Brown County Courthouse, Green Bay, Wisconsin
- Miller Brewing Company, Milwaukee, Wisconsin

== Works ==
- “Beauty Restored to Historic Church: Saint Francis Xavier in Vincennes – the Oldest Parish in the Indiana Territory”. Adoremus Bulletin, vol. XV, no. 3.
- “Choosing Wisely Among Stained Glass Restoration Methods”. Church Executive Magazine, December, 2002.
- "Safety" in The Stained Glass Handbook, 2006.
- “Seabees Construct Stained Glass Windows in Iraq”. Stained Glass Quarterly, Winter, 2006.
- “Selecting a Stained Glass Style”. Religious Product News, October, 2007.
- “Metallic Wall Coatings”. PaintPro Magazine, November/December, 2007.
- “Scagliola: Beautiful Faker”. PWC: Painting and Wallcovering Contractor, November/December, 2007.
- “Midwestern Masterpiece”. Journal of Architectural Coatings, May, 2008.
- “Protecting your Decorative Investment”. Religious Product News, January, 2009.
- “Protecting your Church Treasures: If something happens to your Treasures, could they be replaced?”. Church & Worship Technology, February, 2009.
- “Objets d’Art: Insuring and Restoring Treasures Can Be Tricky”. Claims Magazine, July, 2009.
