= Emmeran M. Bliemel =

Catholic priest who died in the American Civil War

Reverend Emmeran M. Bliemel
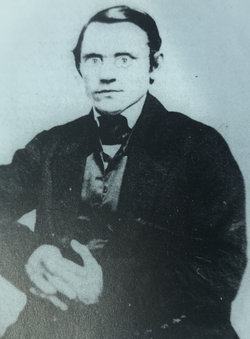
- Born: 29 September 1831; Regensburg, Bavaria
- Died: 31 August 1864 (aged 32); Atlanta, Georgia
- Military career
- Allegiance: Confederate States
- Branch: Confederate States Army
- Service years: 1864
- Units: Company S, 10th Tennessee Infantry Regiment
- Conflicts: American Civil War; Battle of Jonesborough
- Awards: Confederate Medal of Honor

Father Emmeran M. Bliemel, OSB (29 September 1831 – 31 August 1864), was a Benedictine Catholic priest who died in the Battle of Jonesborough during the American Civil War, becoming the first chaplain killed in action in any American battle. While serving as Chaplain of the 10th Tennessee Regiment, he ministered to the spiritual needs of wounded soldiers, under fire as well as behind the lines. He was decapitated by a cannonball while giving the last rites to Colonel William Grace. Bliemel also ministered to the soldiers of the 4th Kentucky Infantry (the Orphan Brigade).

== Early life ==
Bliemel was born on 29 September 1831 in Regensburg, Bavaria. He was named after the patron saint of St. Emmeram's Abbey (Kloster Sankt Emmeram) now known as Schloss Thurn und Taxis. As a youth, he studied at St. Michael's Abbey in Deggendorf, Germany. He emigrated to the United States in 1850, hoping to be a missionary to German Catholics in Pennsylvania, where he already had several cousins. He continued his studies at the Saint Vincent Archabbey in Latrobe, Pennsylvania, from 1852 to 1856 and taught mathematics at the college attached to the abbey, Saint Vincent College.

== Career ==
In 1856, Bliemel was ordained as a Benedictine priest in Latrobe, Pennsylvania, by Bishop Michael O'Malley. From 1856–1860 he was assigned to Catholic parishes in Pennsylvania, in Hollidaysburg, Johnstown and Elk County. In June 1860 became a naturalized U.S. citizen, and was soon assigned to St. Joseph's Church in Covington, Kentucky, but moved only six months later to Nashville, Tennessee where he was assigned to the Church of the Assumption. When the Civil War commenced, he asked to be assigned as chaplain to the men from his area. In October 1862, the Tennessee Regiment in Mississippi listed Bliemel as their chaplain, even though he was still in Tennessee. In November 1862 he was transferred officially to St. Mary's Cathedral. On October 4, 1863, the last official church record made by Father Bliemel was a baptism certificate.

== Military service ==
Bliemel officially enlisted as a chaplain on 20 February 1864 at the age of 32 in Company S, 10th Tennessee Infantry Regiment. He died in the Battle of Jonesborough in Georgia on August 31, 1864. Initially he was buried by Mary Anne "Mollie" Holliday in her family plot near the scene of the battle, on the present day site of the Historic Clayton County Courthouse. Through his burial in the Holliday family plot Bliemel would become tied to two of Mollie Holliday's relatives who would later become famous: Doc Holliday and Margaret Mitchell. Bliemel’s remains were later moved twice, first to the Patrick R. Cleburne Confederate Cemetery in Jonesboro, and in 1899 to a Benedictine parish in Tuscumbia, Alabama.

On March 12, 1983 Bliemel was awarded the Confederate Medal of Honor, created in 1977 by the Sons of Confederate Veterans.
