= Conrad Schmitt Studios =

Architectural arts studio in Wisconsin, US

Coordinates: 43.0009435°N 88.1136869°W

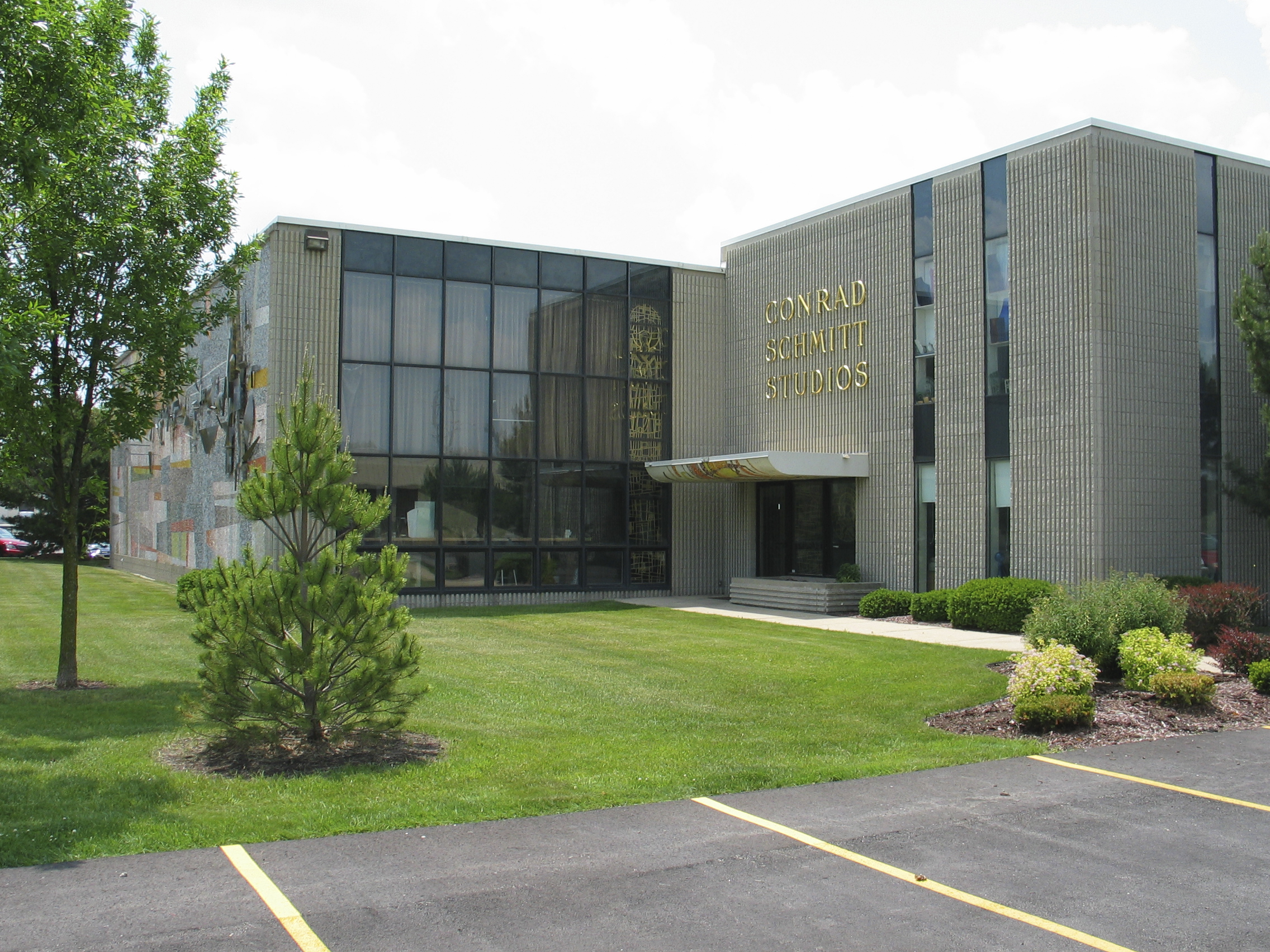

Practice information
- Firm type: Glass installation and restoration, interior design
- Founders: Conrad Schmitt
- Founded: 1889
- No. of employees: 65
- Location: New Berlin, Wisconsin

Website
- conradschmitt.com

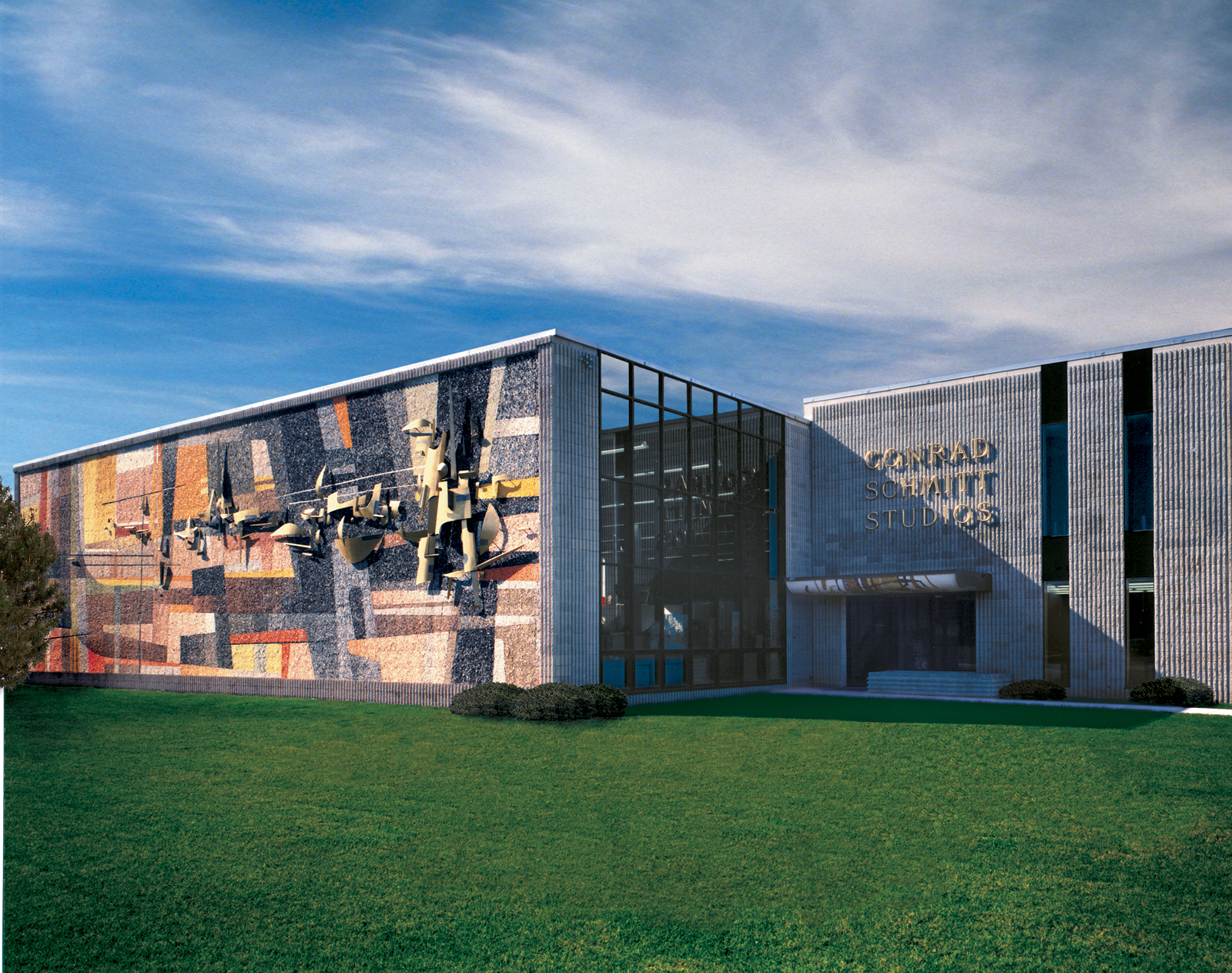

Conrad Schmitt Studios is an architectural arts studio located in New Berlin, Wisconsin. It provides ecclesiastical art, stained glass artistry, art glass, decorative painting, mosaics, murals and sculptural arts. The studio specializes in restoration services for buildings of architectural, historical and religious significance. Founded in 1889 by German-American artist Conrad Schmitt, the company is one of the oldest and largest glass studios in the United States.

== History ==
In 1889, Bavarian immigrant and formally trained artist, Conrad Schmitt, organized the Conrad Schmitt Studios with a focus on stained glass, decorative painting, and liturgical artwork. Originally located at 223 2nd Street in Milwaukee, Wisconsin, the studio was among the city's pioneer businesses. As one of the few art studios with the capacity to handle large-scale interior design projects, it quickly gained a national reputation and participated in increasingly complex projects across the country. Some of the studio's prominent early commissions included St. Mary's Cathedral in Winnipeg, Canada in 1919, The Milwaukee Public Library in 1920, and Milwaukee's Davidson Theater (now closed) in 1925. During the 1930s, studio branch offices operated out of New York City and Washington, D.C.

Bernard O. Gruenke, who was hired by company founder Conrad Schmitt in 1936, purchased the company in 1951 from members of the Schmitt family. In 1981, his son Bernard E. Gruenke assumed leadership of the company. Since 2010, the studio has been owned and operated by a third generation of the Gruenke family: B. Gunar Gruenke and Heidi Gruenke Emery.

Conrad Schmitt Studios is represented at the Smith Museum of Stained Glass Windows at Navy Pier in Chicago, and a replica of the early studio is featured in the "Streets of Old Milwaukee" display at the Milwaukee Public Museum.

== Technological innovations ==
=== Dalle de Verre ===
In 1950, Bernard O. Gruneke, then art director of Conrad Schmitt Studios, was one of the first American artists to experiment with the dalle de verre technique of producing stained glass (also known as "slab glass" or "faceted glass"). Gruenke was inspired while traveling in France during the 1940s, and is credited with what may be the first dalle de verre window created in the United States. Experiments with epoxy and support structure at Conrad Schmitt Studios led to the first large-scale installations of faceted glass in the country, including a chapel at Notre Dame University's Moreau Seminary in South Bend, Indiana in 1959.

=== Leptat ===
Leptat glass is a signature etched glass patented and produced by Conrad Schmitt Studios. After viewing a Czechoslovak glass exhibit at the 1969 World's Fair in Osaka, Japan, Bernard O. Gruenke began to explore etching techniques at his New Berlin studio. He and his son experimented with new methods that produced results unlike the evenly frosted effect achieved by traditional acid-etching methods. The process, called "Leptat" from the Czech word meaning "to etch", creates a deeply etched and varied crystalline surface. In some instances, gold leaf or colored enamels can be inlaid for further decoration of the glass. Leptat windows can be seen at the Waldorf-Astoria Hotel in New York City.

== Current operations ==
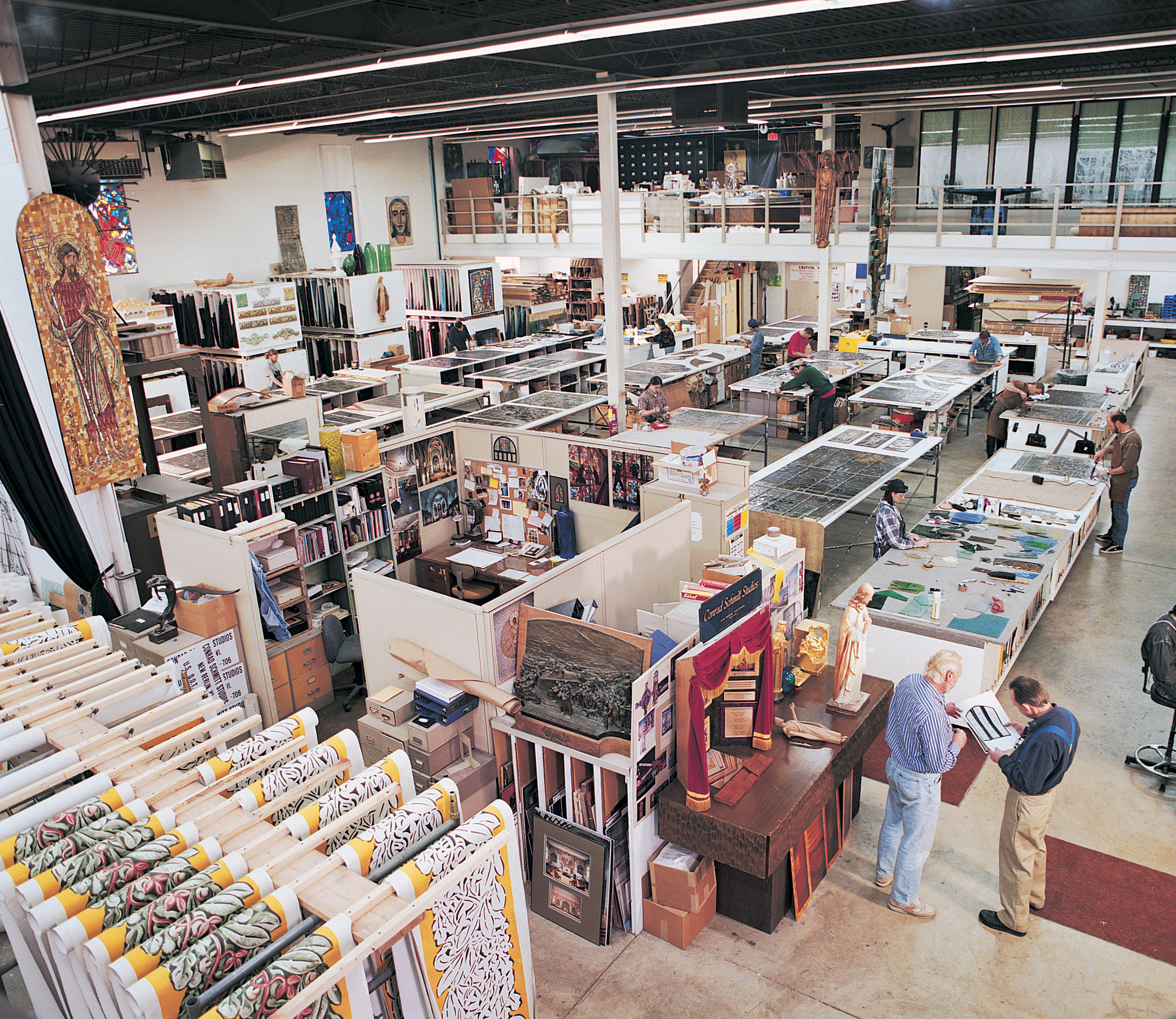

The studio is under the direction of President B. Gunar Gruenke and Vice-President Heidi Gruenke Emery. At the 34,000-square-foot (3,200 m^{2}) facility in New Berlin, Wisconsin, artisans create, conserve and restore stained glass. The company also provides ecclesiastical art, art glass, decorative painting, interior design, mosaics, murals, and sculptural arts.

== Notable artists ==
- Bernard O. Gruenke

== Publications ==
- Schmitt, Conrad. "The Al Secco Method of Mural Painting", Church Property Administration Magazine, 1937.
- Schmitt, Edward J. "Protecting Church Decorations" Church Property Administration Magazine, 1938.

== Notable projects ==
Project	Location	Work done	Date completed
Independent Presbyterian Church	Birmingham, Alabama	Stained glass windows	2001
Cathedral of the Most Blessed Sacrament	Detroit, Michigan	Stained glass windows	2001
Walter Library	Minneapolis, Minnesota	Restoration	2002
Palace Theatre	Albany, New York	Decoration, restoration	2003
Sacred Heart Cathedral	Rochester, New York	Restoration	2005
Cathedral of the Immaculate Conception	Springfield, Illinois	Restoration, decoration	2009
Northrop Auditorium	Minneapolis, Minnesota	Restoration, decoration	2011
Paramount Theatre	Cedar Rapids, Iowa	Restoration	2011
Cathedral of St. Peter the Apostle	Jackson, Mississippi	Restoration	2012
Holy Hill - St. Theresa Chapel	Hubertus, Wisconsin	Stained glass windows	2012
St. Joseph Co-Cathedral	Thibodaux, Louisiana	Decoration, stained glass windows	2012
St. John the Baptist Catholic Church	Glandorf, Ohio	Restoration	2016
University of St. Francis	Fort Wayne, Indiana	Stained glass windows	2017
Christ Chapel (Hillsdale College)	Hillsdale, Michigan	Stained glass windows	2019
Church of the Assumption	Nashville, Tennessee	Stained glass windows	2020
St. Joseph's Catholic Church	Oil City, Pennsylvania	Decoration, restoration	2021
Cathedral of St. John the Baptist	Savannah, Georgia	Decoration	2023
St. Mary of the Assumption Church	Fort Worth, Texas	Decoration, restoration	2024
