= USS Seminole (1859) =

Gunboat of the United States Navy

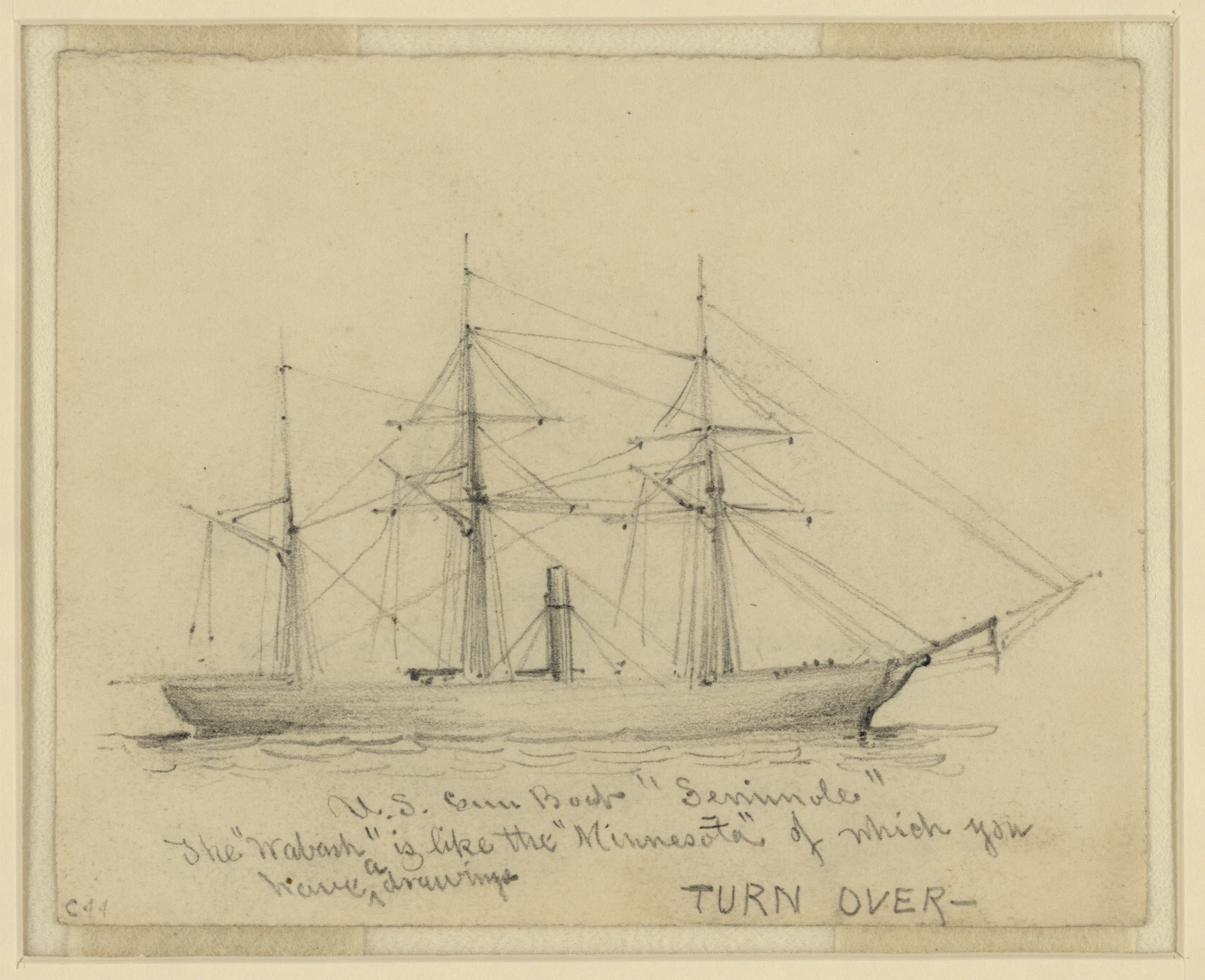
- U.S. Gun Boat "Seminole" in 1860

History

United States
- Name: USS Seminole
- Builder: Pensacola Navy Yard
- Launched: 25 June 1859
- Sponsored by: Ms. Mary Dallas
- Commissioned: 25 April 1860
- Decommissioned: 11 August 1865
- Fate: Sold, 20 July 1870

General characteristics
- Type: Screw sloop-of-war
- Displacement: 801 long tons (814 t)
- Length: 188 ft (57 m)
- Beam: 30 ft 6 in (9.30 m)
- Propulsion: Sail and steam engine
- Complement: 120 officers and enlisted
- Armament: 1 × 11 in (280 mm) Dahlgren gun, 1 × 30-pounder Parrott rifle, 6 × 32-pounder guns, 1 × light 12-pounder gun

The first USS Seminole was a steam sloop-of-war in the United States Navy during the American Civil War.

Seminole was launched by the Pensacola Navy Yard on 25 June 1859; sponsored by Ms. Mary Dallas; and was commissioned there on 25 April 1860, Commander Edward R. Thomson in command.

== Civil War service ==
Seminole sailed for Brazil on 16 July 1860 and served on the Brazil Station until called home soon after the outbreak of the American Civil War. The ship departed Rio de Janeiro on 23 May 1861 and reached Philadelphia, Pennsylvania on 6 July.

Rapidly fitted out for blockade duty, Seminole was ordered on 16 July to proceed to Hampton Roads. After reporting for duty in the Atlantic Blockading Squadron, the ship sailed, via Charleston, South Carolina, for Savannah, Georgia. Upon exhausting her coal on blockade duty off that port, the ship sailed for Hampton Roads on 19 August, towing the prize schooner Albion, and arrived off Newport News on the 23rd. A week later, on 30 August, the Confederate tug Harmony attacked the Union sailing sloop of war USS Savannah there. Seminole was in the vicinity and returned the fire, but her shells did not reach the Southern ship.

On 9 September, Seminole and USS Rescue sailed for the Potomac River to check the threat posed by the concentration of a large Confederate force on the south bank of the river below Alexandria. On the 21st, a boat from Seminole captured the sloop Maryland in the Potomac. Four days later, Seminole and USS Jacob Bell engaged a Confederate battery at Freestone Point, Virginia. After repairs at the Washington Navy Yard, Seminole returned to Hampton Roads on 16 October where she awaited the arrival of Flag Officer Samuel F. Du Pont, commander of the newly established South Atlantic Blockading Squadron.

On 7 November, Seminole was in the task force which captured Port Royal, South Carolina. The ships bombarded Forts Walker and Beauregard and forced the Confederates to abandon them. This gave the Union Navy an invaluable base for blockade operations off South Carolina, Georgia, and Florida. On 1 December, Seminole seized the sloop Lida off St. Simons Sound, Georgia, attempting to slip into the South laden with coffee, lead, and sugar from Havana, Cuba. Early in March, Seminole participated in the expedition which captured Fernandina, Florida.

On 25 March 1862, Seminole was ordered to Hampton Roads to strengthen Union naval forces there which were threatened by the dreaded Confederate ironclad CSS Virginia. Control of these strategic waters was especially important at that time because General George McClellan was about to launch his Peninsula Campaign against the Southern capital, Richmond, Virginia. On 8 May, Seminole joined USS Monitor, USS Dacotah, USS Naugatuck, and USS Susquehanna in shelling Confederate batteries at Sewell's Point, Virginia. In response, Virginia came out, but not far enough to be rammed. Norfolk, Virginia was soon abandoned by Southern troops. Late in June, Seminole was ordered to the New York Navy Yard for repairs.

The ship was recommissioned on 8 June 1863 and assigned to the West Gulf Blockading Squadron. En route south, she captured the Confederate steamer CSS Charleston on 11 July. On 11 September, she took the steamer Sir William Peel off the mouth of the Rio Grande. This British merchantman was carrying 1,000 bales of cotton at the time of her capture.

The high point of her service in the West Gulf Blockading Squadron came on 5 August 1864 when she participated in the Battle of Mobile Bay. She passed the forts guarding the entrance to the bay lashed to USS Lackawanna but, as the action became general, cast off from her consort. After the Southern ironclad CSS Tennessee surrendered, prisoners taken from her were taken on board Seminole.

In the days that followed, the ships of Farragut's fleet were busy clearing torpedoes from the waters and bombarding Fort Morgan until it surrendered on the 23rd.

Five days later, Seminole was ordered to Pensacola, Florida for repairs. On 14 September, the ship was sent to Galveston, Texas, and she remained active along the coast of Texas through the end of the war, taking the schooner Josephine, which was attempting to slip out of Galveston laden with cotton on 14 January 1865. Her final action of the war came on 23 May, when she sent a party on board Denbigh and helped to set the blockade runner aflame.

Seminole sailed for the North on 20 July and was decommissioned at the Boston Navy Yard on 11 August, where it was laid up until sold on 20 July 1870 to Mullen and Winchester.

== See also ==
- Union Navy
- List of sloops of war of the United States Navy
