= Isaac Brown (naval officer) =

Isaac Newton Brown
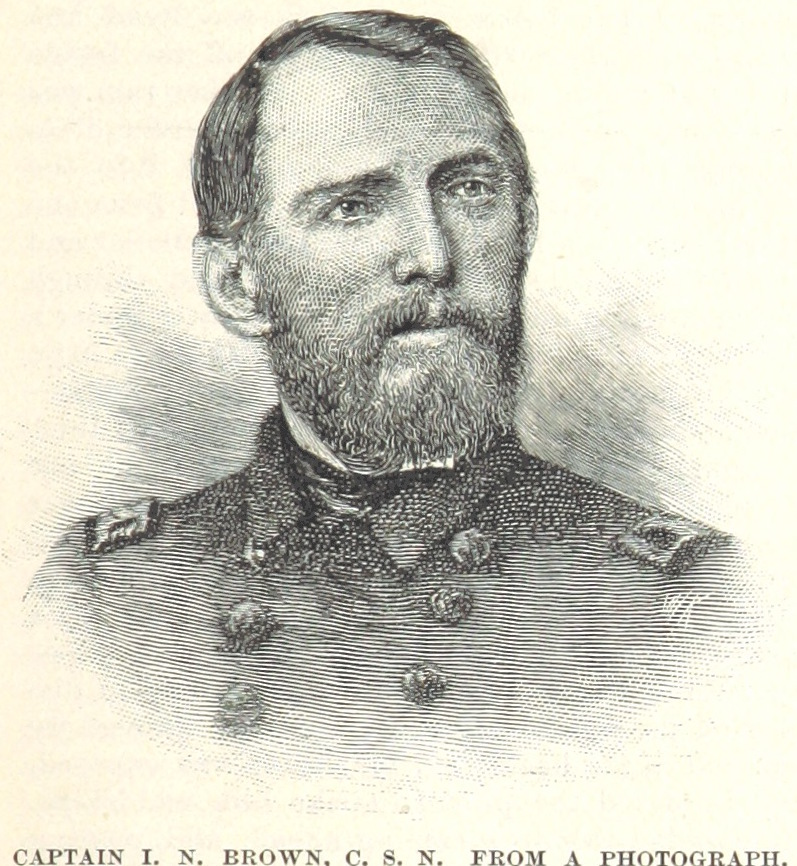
- A drawing of Brown, from a photograph
- Born: May 27, 1817; Caldwell County, Kentucky, U.S.
- Died: September 1, 1889 (aged 72); Corsicana, Texas, U.S.
- Military career
- Allegiance: United States of America; Confederate States of America
- Branch: United States Navy; Confederate States Navy
- Service years: 1834–1861 (U.S.); 1861–1865 (C.S.)
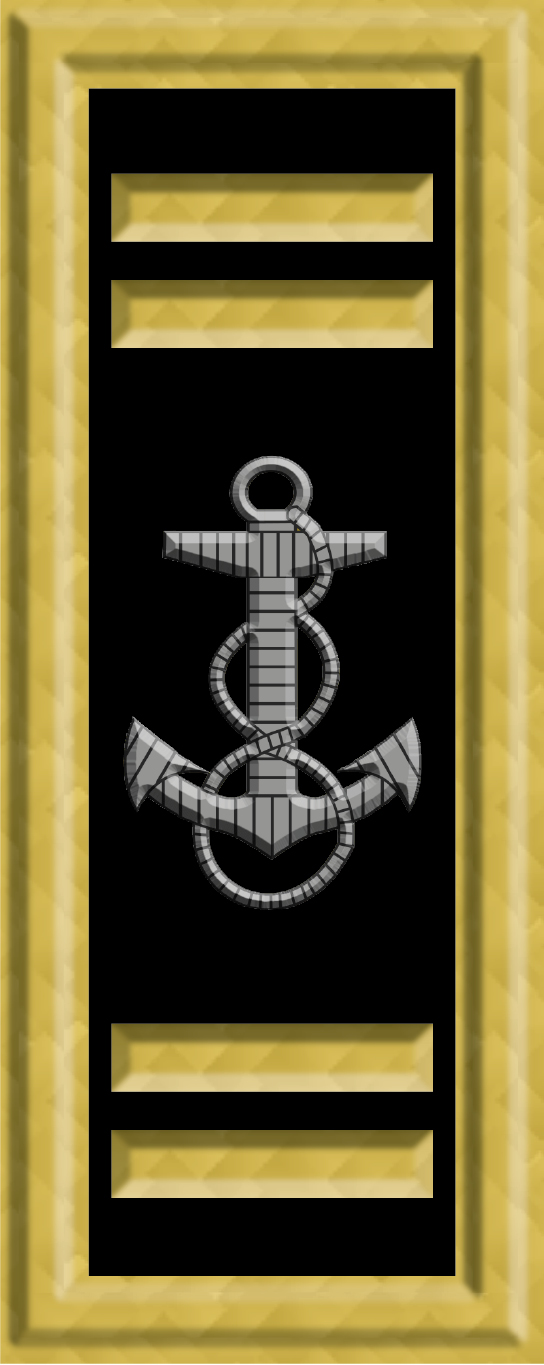
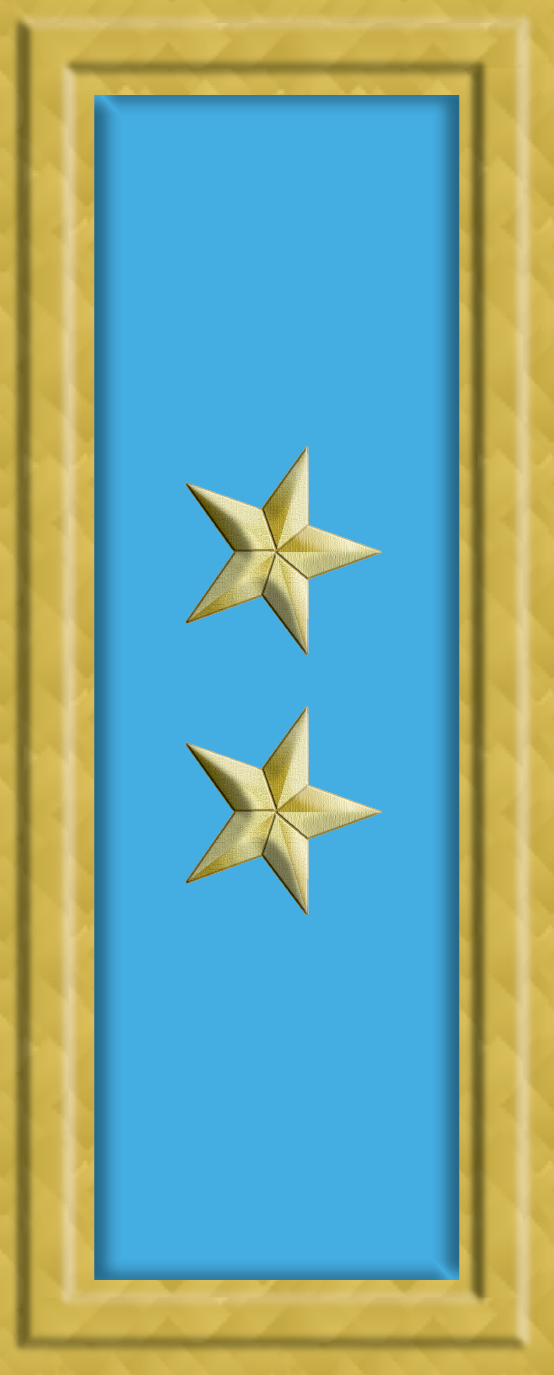
- Rank: Lieutenant (USN) Commander (CSN)
- Commands: CSS Arkansas; CSS Charleston
- Conflicts: Mexican–American War; American Civil War

Isaac Newton Brown (May 27, 1817 – September 1, 1889) was an American naval officer who served in the United States Navy and in the Confederate States Navy during the American Civil War.

Isaac N. Brown was born in Caldwell County, Kentucky, but spent part of his later youth in western Tennessee. In March 1834, shortly after his father died, he joined the United States Navy as a midshipman. He received a commission as a lieutenant in 1846 and later participated in the Mexican–American War. He married, owned property on the Mississippi Delta, and had three sons. He remained in the Navy and made several trips around the world on various ships.

Shortly after the outbreak of the Civil War in April 1861, he resigned his commission. In June, he accepted a commission as a lieutenant in the fledgling Confederate States Navy. Brown was assigned to the Mississippi River region by the Confederate Naval Department. In May 1862 he was ordered to Yazoo City, Mississippi, to take command of the unfinished ironclad CSS Arkansas and complete her construction in the worst of conditions. After successfully accomplishing this difficult task, Brown commanded her dramatic breaking of the Union blockade of Vicksburg, Mississippi, on July 15, 1862.

Brown was promoted to commander in August 1862 in recognition of his bold and audacious actions at Vicksburg. Commander Brown served as captain of the ironclad CSS Charleston, which operated in defense of Charleston, South Carolina, during 1863–1865.

At the end of the Civil War, Brown took up farming in Mississippi and later moved to Texas. He died at Corsicana, Texas, and is buried in Oakwood Cemetery.

The Sons of Confederate Veterans awarded their Confederate Medal of Honor, started in 1977, to Brown for his distinguished service.

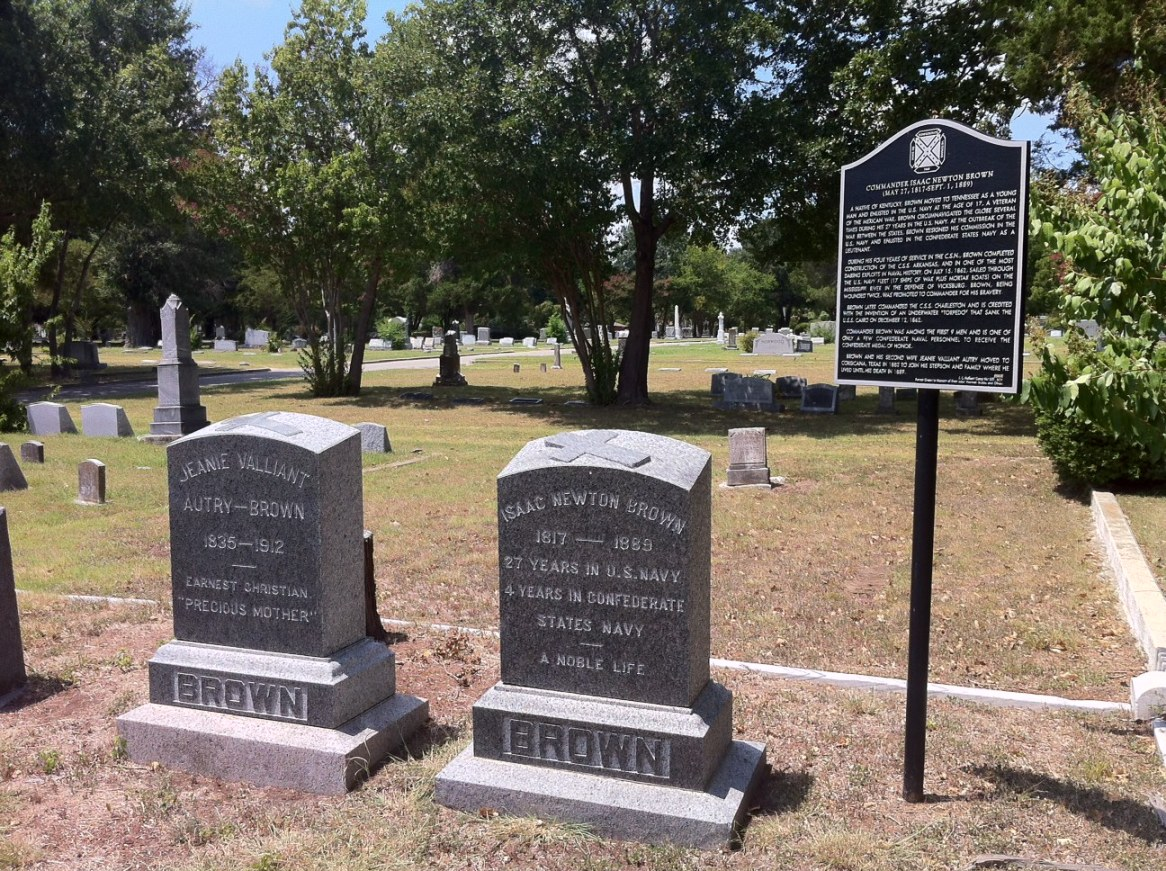
Brown's grave at Oakwood Cemetery

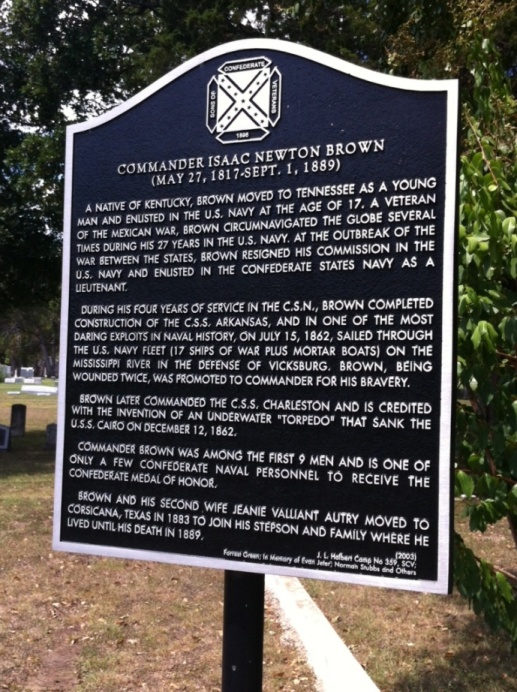
The S.C.V. Marker at Brown's grave
