= Bernard Gruenke =

American stained glass artist

Bernard Otto Gruenke (February 17, 1913 – March 31, 2012) was an American stained glass artist who produced one of the first faceted (Dalle de Verre) glass windows in the United States in 1949. He was born in Sheboygan, Wisconsin.

== Early life ==
At sixteen, Gruenke was encouraged in the pursuit of art by Marie Kohler, a member of the bath fixtures company. She provided him with a scholarship to the Corcoran College of Art and Design in Washington, D.C. He left for Corcoran in 1934, working as a sign painter by day and studying portrait painting at night. He also studied under Caesar Riccardi, a former student of the well-respected artist Robert Henri.

Gruenke joined Conrad Schmitt Studios in 1936 after returning to Wisconsin, where he worked with Conrad Schmitt, the founder. In the late 1940s, Gruenke became a partner in the studio and in 1951, he purchased the company. Gruenke and Conrad Schmitt Studios furnished murals, stained glass, and decorating for churches, theatres and public buildings throughout the United States.

== Travel and innovation ==
In 1949, Gruenke made his first trip to Europe and became inspired by the more progressive materials and designs in the art glass field- in particular, some of the early Dalle de verre, or "slab glass", from France. He began experimenting with internal reinforcement of the faceted glass, casting with cement. Over the years he introduced the new glass form to many areas around the U.S.

== Notable projects ==
Gruenke was also known for his work in interior decoration. He designed or redecorated the interiors of cathedrals and churches throughout the country.

- White House Visitor Center in Washington, DC
- Hawaii Theatre in Honolulu, Hawaii
- The Egyptian Theatre in Boise, Idaho
- New Regal Theater in Chicago, Illinois
- John H. Bass Mansion in Fort Wayne, Indiana
- Basilica of the Sacred Heart, Notre Dame University in South Bend, Indiana
- Wang Center for the Performing Arts in Boston, Massachusetts
- Union Station in St. Louis, Missouri
- Cathedral of St. Helena in Helena, Montana
- Plaza Hotel in New York City
- Cathedral of the Immaculate Conception in Memphis, Tennessee
- Holy Hill National Shrine of Mary, Help of Christians in Hubertus, Wisconsin
- Basilica of St. Josaphat in Milwaukee, Wisconsin
- Federal Building in Milwaukee, Wisconsin
- The Pabst Theater in Milwaukee, Wisconsin

== Honors ==
Gruenke was recognized by the Stained Glass Association of America (SGAA), being named a Fellow of the organization in 1972. In 1996, he was given the SGAA's Lifetime Achievement Award. In 1980, Gruenke was awarded an honorary doctorate by Mount Mary College in Wauwatosa, Wisconsin.

- National Trust for Historic Preservation Award (2)
- League of Historic American Theatres Award
- Public Buildings Heritage Award
- Arizona Governor's Award for Historic Preservation
- Utah State Historical Society Award
- Historic Savannah Foundation's Trustees Award for Excellence
- Maui Historical Society Annual Preservation Award
- Milwaukee County Historical Society Preservation Award
- Wisconsin Society of Architects Contractors Award
- Architecture Minnesota Historic Preservation Award
- State of New Mexico Historic Preservation Award
- American Institute of Architects Minnesota Honor Award
- American Institute of Architects Wisconsin Honor Award
