= CSS Charleston =

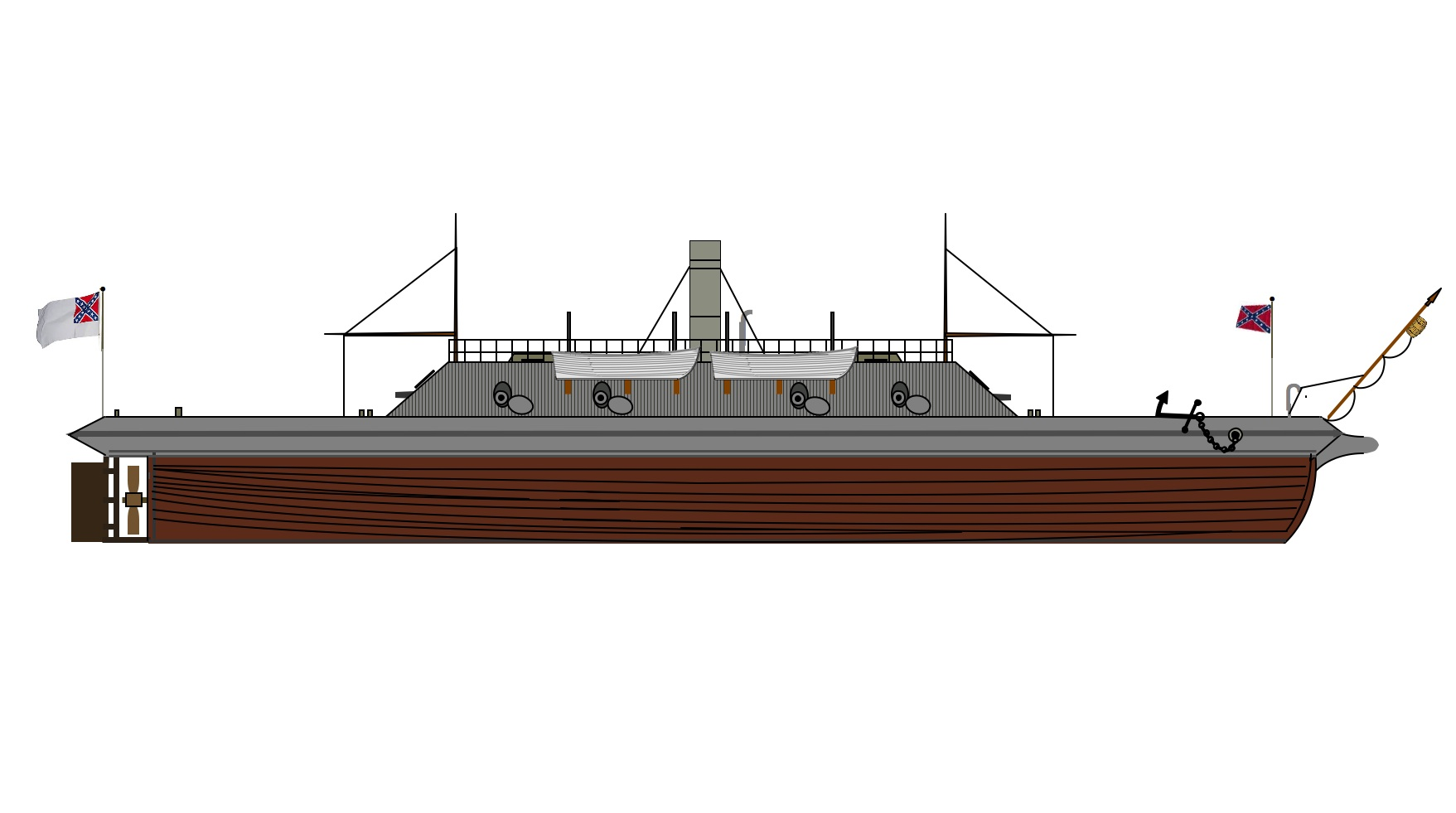

History

Confederate States
- Name: Charleston
- Namesake: Charleston, South Carolina
- Ordered: Fall 1862
- Builder: James M. Eason, Charleston
- Laid down: December 1862
- Launched: 1863
- Commissioned: September 1863
- Nickname(s): Ladies' Gunboat
- Fate: Destroyed to avoid capture, 17/18 February 1865

General characteristics
- Type: Casemate ironclad
- Displacement: 600 long tons (610 t)
- Length: 189 ft (57.6 m)
- Beam: 34 ft (10.4 m)
- Draft: 12 ft 6 in (3.8 m)
- Depth: 14 ft (4.3 m)
- Propulsion: 1 shaft, 1 steam engine
- Speed: 6 kn (11 km/h; 6.9 mph)
- Complement: 150 officers and men
- Armament: 2 × 9 in (229 mm) smoothbore Dahlgren guns; 4 × 7 in (178 mm) muzzle-loading Brooke rifles; 1 x Spar Torpedo
- Armor: 4 in (102 mm)

CSS Charleston was a casemate ironclad ram built for the Confederate Navy (CSN) at Charleston, South Carolina during the American Civil War. Funded by the State of South Carolina as well as donations by patriotic women's associations in the city, she was turned over to the Confederate Navy and defended the city until advancing Union troops that threatened Charleston caused her to be destroyed in early 1865 lest she be captured. Her wreck was salvaged after the war and the remains have been obliterated by subsequent dredging.

== Construction and description ==
James M. Eason was awarded a contract by the State of South Carolina to build a larger ironclad at Charleston in November 1862 after he finished the casemate ram CSS Chicora. Funds were also contributed by the city's "Ladies' Gun-boat Association", which led to Charleston's nickname of the "Ladies' Gunboat". He began construction the next month and completed the ship in September 1863.

Charleston was 189 feet (57.6 m) long overall and had a beam of 34 feet (10 m). Her depth of hold was 14 feet (4.3 m) and she had a draft 12 ft 6 in (3.8 m). The ship had a displacement of 600 long tons (610 t). Charleston's propulsion system is unknown, but her engine had a diameter of 36 inches (910 mm) and her propeller was 8 feet 6 inches (2.6 m) in diameter. At any rate, she was credited with a speed of 6 knots (11 km/h; 6.9 mph). The ship was armed with two 9-inch (229 mm) smoothbore guns at the ends of the ship, probably Dahlgren guns, and four muzzle-loading Brooke rifles on the broadside that fired 90–110-pound (41–50 kg) projectiles, which would make them 7-inch (178 mm) guns although their exact type is unknown. Charleston was also fitted with a wrought-iron ram. The ship's armor was 4 inches (102 mm) thick. All together, her ram and armor weighed 600 long tons (610 t). Her crew numbered 150 officers and enlisted men.

== Service ==
Once completed, Charleston served as the flagship of the CSN's Charleston Squadron together with the rams Palmetto State and Chicora. Her only captain was Commander Isaac N. Brown. The ship was set on fire and blown up with 10 long tons (10 t) of gunpowder in the Cooper River on the night of 17/18 February 1865 to prevent her capture by the Union Army once the city was evacuated by the Confederates. The wreck was salvaged to a depth of 12 feet (3.7 m) below low water by Benjamin Maillefort in 1872–73 and the site has been thoroughly dredged to deepen the channel, destroying any remains. Its last known location was at 32°47′29″N 79°55′21″W

== Bibliography ==
- Bisbee, Saxon T. (2018). Engines of Rebellion: Confederate Ironclads and Steam Engineering in the American Civil War. Tuscaloosa, Alabama: University of Alabama Press. ISBN 978-0-81731-986-1.
- Canney, Donald L. (2015). The Confederate Steam Navy 1861-1865. Atglen, Pennsylvania: Schiffer Publishing. ISBN 978-0-7643-4824-2.
- Gaines, W. Craig (2008). Encyclopedia of Civil War Shipwrecks. Baton Rouge, Louisiana: Louisiana State University Press. ISBN 978-0-8071-3274-6.
- Koehler, R. B. & Sileo, Thomas (2008). "Question 40/43: Fates of Confederate Ironclads". Warship International. XLV (4): 276–277. ISSN 0043-0374.
- Luraghi, Raimondo (1996). A History of the Confederate Navy. Annapolis, Maryland: Naval Institute Press. ISBN 1-55750-527-6.
- Olmstead, Edwin; Stark, Wayne E. & Tucker, Spencer C. (1997). The Big Guns: Civil War Siege, Seacoast, and Naval Cannon. Alexandria Bay, New York: Museum Restoration Service. ISBN 0-88855-012-X.
- Scharf, J. Thomas (1887). History of the Confederate States Navy. New York: Rogers & Sherwood.
- Silverstone, Paul H. (2006). Civil War Navies 1855–1883. The U.S. Navy Warship Series. New York: Routledge. ISBN 0-415-97870-X.
- Silverstone, Paul H. (1984). Directory of the World's Capital Ships. New York: Hippocrene Books. ISBN 0-88254-979-0.
- Still, William N. Jr. (1985) [1971]. Iron Afloat: The Story of the Confederate Armorclads. Columbia, South Carolina: University of South Carolina Press. ISBN 0-87249-454-3.
