= Conrad Schmitt =

American painter

Conrad Schmitt (April 20, 1867 – December 28, 1940) was twelve years old when his family's church in Fussville, Wisconsin was decorated for the first time, in 1879. Watching skilled artists transform the space with paints and stencils, he realized that this was his calling. At fourteen, he was apprenticed to Professor Louis Loeffler, a church decorator in Milwaukee.

Then his practical, Bavarian-immigrant parents prevailed in their quest to have Conrad attend business school for two years. The time he spent learning the basics of running a business turned out to provide invaluable knowledge for the founder of an international art studio. Conrad also studied under the respected mural artist, Jan Sukaczynski, and with master painters in Rome. They included Joseph Wilpert, a fresco painter who was also an expert in the ancient artwork of the catacombs of Rome. Conrad was a talented artist and a hard worker. In order to keep a promise to his employer while decorating the Milwaukee courthouse, he once walked twelve miles from his father's home in a heavy snowstorm.

By the age of twenty, Conrad was already handling large projects for bishops, bankers and elite residential clients. He drew employees from the many skilled, European artists living in the U.S. He also visited Europe and brought those with great talent to America. Soon CSS had a staff approaching two dozen. A solid business with skilled artisans, Conrad Schmitt Studios quickly became one of few national companies to conduct large-scale interior decorating and stained glass projects, along with Tiffany Studios of New York. The Studio provides artwork for churches, estates, theatres, courthouses, banks and other public buildings throughout the country.
