= National Register of Historic Places listings in Washington County, Wisconsin =

Location of Washington County in Wisconsin

This is a list of the National Register of Historic Places listings in Washington County, Wisconsin. It is intended to provide a comprehensive listing of entries in the National Register of Historic Places that are located in Washington County, Wisconsin. The locations of National Register properties for which the latitude and longitude coordinates are included below may be seen in a map.

There are 31 properties and districts listed on the National Register in the county.

This National Park Service list is complete through NPS recent listings posted August 22, 2025.

== Current listings ==
	Name on the Register	Image	Date listed	Location	City or town	Description
1	Amity Leather Products Company Factory	Amity Leather Products Company Factory	July 11, 2002 (#02000778)	723-735 S. Main St. 43°24′53″N 88°10′49″W	West Bend	Billfold factory, built in 1925 and expanded in 1929, 1933 & 1959. The style is "textile mill industrial loft," designed by Lockwood, Greene & Co. with ample windows and a 6-story Art Deco tower. Made billfolds until 1996. Now apartments. Closed in 2014.
2	Barton Elementary School	Barton Elementary School	May 7, 2018 (#100002395)	614 School Pl. 43°26′35″N 88°11′07″W	West Bend	Public school built in 1924, and added to in 1955, 1960, 1969 and 2000. Closed in 2014.
3	Barton Historic District	Barton Historic District	March 5, 1992 (#92000109)	Roughly bounded by Harrison and Jefferson Sts., Barton Ave., Salisbury Rd., Monroe St. and the Milwaukee R. 43°26′30″N 88°10′55″W	West Bend	Now engulfed by West Bend, the modest former village of Barton retains survivors from its early frontier days. Includes the 1850 gabled-ell Hays-Raif house, the 1865 Barton Roller Mill, the 1865 Frazer General Store, the 1865 Greek Revival Frazer House, the 1900 Gothic Revival St Mary's church, the 1915 Barton Bank, the 1921 Ustruck bungalow, and the 1928 French Revival Kircher house.
4	Christ Evangelical Church	Christ Evangelical Church	November 9, 1983 (#83004324)	W188 N12808 Fond du Lac Avenue; 43°15′02″N 88°09′19″W	Germantown	Gothic Revival-styled church built in 1861-62 by German immigrants from the Hunsrück Mountains of limestone blocks quarried a mile away. Now a museum.
5	Leander F. Frisby House	Leander F. Frisby House	June 19, 1985 (#85001363)	304 S. Main St. 43°25′15″N 88°10′52″W	West Bend	2-story Italianate-style home with cupola, built in 1865 by Frisby, a teacher, lawyer, state-level politician, and a founder of the Republican party in Wisconsin. The exterior was originally frame, then veneered with cream brick in 1891.
6	Gadow's Mill	Gadow's Mill	December 24, 1974 (#74000136)	1784 Barton Ave. 43°26′33″N 88°10′52″W	West Bend	Flour mill powered by the Milwaukee River, built 1865 (or 1843?) by Robert Price and initially called Barton Roller Mill, grinding wheat from local farmers and shipping flour in barrels to larger markets. The mill was operated by the Gadows until 1964, the last mill in Wisconsin to grind wheat flour and one of the last driven by water power.
7	Holy Hill	Holy Hill	March 12, 1992 (#92000139)	1525 Carmel Rd. 43°14′42″N 88°19′38″W	Erin	Romanesque Revival-style Catholic church and monastery atop a prominent kame, suggesting a medieval fortress. Includes the Shrine of Mary built 1926-31, a Carmelite monastery, Way of the Cross path, and Lourdes grotto, a destination for pilgrims.
8	Kissel's Addition Historic District	Kissel's Addition Historic District	November 3, 1988 (#88002071)	Rural St. and W. Root Ave. 43°18′57″N 88°22′50″W	Hartford	Residential neighborhood on the southwest side of town, platted for the Kissels in 1901. Most of the original houses were smaller gabled-ell and side-gabled houses, many built by the Kissels with materials from their lumber company and brickyard. The Kissels incorporated the Kissel Motor Car Company in 1906 and sold many of the homes they built to their employees, in a vertically integrated business like Henry Ford's.
9	Kissel's Wheelock Addition Historic District	Kissel's Wheelock Addition Historic District	November 3, 1988 (#88002072)	Roughly bounded by Church St., Wheelock and Linden Aves., Branch St., and Teddy Ave. 43°18′50″N 88°22′24″W	Hartford	Residential neighborhood on the southeast side of town, platted for the Kissels in 1903 with an addition in 1916. Houses were again built by the Kissel enterprise, mostly larger side-gable and cross-gable houses built for somewhat wealthier families, with stone basements, golden oak finish, hardwood floors, electricity and plumbing.
10	George A. Kissel House	George A. Kissel House	November 3, 1988 (#88002075)	215 E. Sumner; 43°19′03″N 88°22′33″W	Hartford	Brick Colonial Revival house built in 1926 for a son of Louis and a manager of Kissel Car.
11	Louis Kissel House	Louis Kissel House	November 3, 1988 (#88002077)	407 E. Sumner; 43°19′03″N 88°22′26″W	Hartford	Queen Anne/Neoclassical-styled house designed by Robert Messmer and built before 1898 for German immigrant and patriarch Louis, who operated a hardware store, co-owned the Hartford Plow Company, brought industry to Hartford, and encouraged his sons' car company.
12	Otto P. Kissel House	Otto P. Kissel House	November 1, 1988 (#88002074)	124 South St. 43°18′58″N 88°22′35″W	Hartford	2.5-story Queen Anne house with Colonial Revival influence and a large veranda built around 1905 for another son of Louis, a manager of the Kissel Real Estate department, and leader of the First National Bank.
13	William L. Kissel House	William L. Kissel House	November 3, 1988 (#88002073)	67 South St. 43°18′59″N 88°22′37″W	Hartford	Frame hip-roofed cube-shape house with Colonial Revival styling, built around 1904, with William's front parlor and dining room largely intact. William was another son of Louis and a manager of Kissel Car.
14	Lizard Mound	Lizard Mound	October 15, 1970 (#70000038)	2121 County Highway A 43°27′48″N 88°08′21″W	Farmington	A well-preserved cluster of effigy mounds, including a 250-foot lizard mound, similarly sized panther and bird mounds, and smaller linear and conical mounds. In a public park. A boundary increase and renaming (from "Lizard Mount State Park" to "Lizard Mound") were approved March 30, 2023.
15	Messer-Mayer Mill	Messer-Mayer Mill	May 30, 2007 (#07000500)	4399 Pleasant Hill Rd. 43°15′57″N 88°15′23″W	Richfield	3.5-story gristmill built 1871-73 on Coney Creek, with its original equipment including a millstone and four roller mills made by Edward P. Allis Company. Site includes 1865 farmhouse, 1890 barn, smoke house, outhouse, and other structures.
16	Ritger Wagonmaking and Blacksmith Shop	Ritger Wagonmaking and Blacksmith Shop	June 1, 1982 (#82000717)	4928 WI 175; 43°22′15″N 88°20′02″W	Addison	1867 shop where Jacob Ritger and then Louis Hermann built and repaired wagons, sleighs and buggies for the surrounding farmers. Walls are 35-inches thick, faced with split fieldstones.
17	St. Agnes Convent and School	St. Agnes Convent and School	November 3, 2010 (#10000879)	1386 Fond du Lac St. 43°26′16″N 88°11′06″W	West Bend	Convent and school founded by Father Caspar Rehrl in 1858 and staffed by the Sisters of St. Agnes order that he founded. Remaining buildings are the 1858 convent, the 1860 rectory and the 1877 barn, all constructed of fieldstone. Now a museum.
18	St. Augustine Catholic Church and Cemetery	St. Augustine Catholic Church and Cemetery	May 3, 1990 (#90000638)	Co. Hwy. Y 3 mi (4.8 km). S of jct. of Co. Hwy. Y and SR 33; 43°23′03″N 88°02′28″W	Trenton	Rural Catholic church built in 1856 with fieldstone walls in a Romanesque Revival style, with an octagonal roof on the steeple and inside paintings by Hans Schmeidl. Founded by a community of immigrants from Bavaria, sermons were in German into the 1940s.
19	St. John of God Roman Catholic Church, Convent, and School	St. John of God Roman Catholic Church, Convent, and School	August 9, 1979 (#79000117)	E of Kewaskum at 1488 Highland Dr. 43°30′48″N 88°06′35″W	Farmington (Boltonville)	Cream brick Gothic Revival Catholic church built in 1891 by the mainly Irish community, with cemetery and ruins of an 1868 convent and an 1868 public school which was staffed by the Sisters of St. Agnes.
20	St. Peter's Church	St. Peter's Church	June 30, 1983 (#83003430)	1010 Newark Dr. 43°27′17″N 88°05′11″W	Farmington	1861 rural Catholic church with fieldstone walls, a half-octagonal apse, and a cross formed of darker stones in the front wall. Served a German community.
21	Saxonia House	Saxonia House	February 22, 2006 (#06000068)	421 WI H 43°29′58″N 88°03′23″W	Farmington (Fillmore)	Inn/brewery/farm complex built by Ernst and Liberta Klessig, German immigrants. They built the large half-timbered-under-stucco house in 1855 and in it operated an inn and tavern which also hosted the local Turner Society. Ernst added a brewery in 1860 with a cave with a vaulted brick ceiling for lagering and storing the beer.
22	Jacob Schunk Farmhouse	Jacob Schunk Farmhouse	December 8, 1983 (#83004325)	Donges Bay Rd. 43°12′24″N 88°06′08″W	Germantown	Farmhouse with walls of limestone rubble built in 1858 in Greek Revival style for German immigrant Schunk. Wing added in 1870.
23	Schwartz Ballroom	Schwartz Ballroom	May 20, 1998 (#98000564)	150 Jefferson Ave. 43°18′37″N 88°22′37″W	Hartford	Large octagonal dance hall designed by Robert Messmer and built in 1928 for Joseph Schwartz Jr. in a park owned by his brewery. Hosted big band performers like Tommy Dorsey, Duke Ellington and Guy Lombardo, with concerts broadcast live by WTMJ and across the US by CBS radio. Also used as a POW camp during WWII.
24	Schwartz Family Home	Schwartz Family Home	May 11, 2018 (#100002445)	220 Union St. 43°19′17″N 88°22′30″W	Hartford	2.5-story Craftsman-styled home built in 1915, with stucco exterior, false half-timbering, and exposed rafter tails. Inside are original fixtures, leaded glass windows and a mural. Joseph Schwartz owned the Schwartz Brewing Co. During Prohibition the family brewed root beer and built the Schwartz Ballroom.
25	Wilhelm Tischer Blacksmith Shop	Wilhelm Tischer Blacksmith Shop	April 14, 2023 (#100008864)	1125 Western Ave. 43°17′38″N 88°05′38″W	Jackson	Boomtown-style wooden blacksmith shop built around 1870 in the Kirchhayn community. Tischer and his apprentices shod horses, fixed tools and implements, fabricated fencing, and built carriages and wagons. Later Tischers and Bruno Woldt continued serving the local community until the 1970s, shifting to auto and tractor repair and welding, yet the forge and anvil stands remain.
26	Washington County "Island" Effigy Mound District	Washington County "Island" Effigy Mound District	April 25, 1996 (#96000417)	Address Restricted	West Bend	Included in the group are the mounds in Lizard Mound County Park.
27	Washington County Courthouse and Jail	Washington County Courthouse and Jail	March 9, 1982 (#82000718)	320 S. 5th Ave. 43°25′12″N 88°10′58″W	West Bend	3.5-story courthouse with an 8-story central tower designed by Edward V. Koch in Richardsonian Romanesque style and built 1889-90, with 1886 jail. Served as courthouse until 1962.
28	West Bend Chicago and North Western Depot	West Bend Chicago and North Western Depot	August 19, 2008 (#08000789)	Veterans Ave. at Willow La. 43°25′28″N 88°10′52″W	West Bend	Long, 1-story Craftsman-influenced depot of the C&NW with baggage room on one end and men's and women's waiting rooms at the other. Probably a design of Frost & Granger, the depot was built in 1900 and served until 1971.
29	West Bend Downtown Historic District	West Bend Downtown Historic District	March 17, 2023 (#100008763)	102-337 North Main, 101-162 South Main, 508 and 519 Hickory, 607 and 623-627 Elm, 623-629 Cedar Sts., 108-112 5th, 100-228 6th Aves. 43°25′27″N 88°10′59″W	West Bend	Much of the old downtown, including the 1869 Lemke block, the 1880 Richter Harness Shop, the 1888 Westenberger meat market, the 1894 Queen Anne-style Weinand building, the 1898 Italianate-style Opgenorth building, the 1898 Queen Anne-style Harns Block, the 1901 German Renaissance Revival-style City Hall, the 1907 Warnkey Tin Shop, the 1908 West Bend Mutual Fire Insurance Company, the 1914 Kuester Bros. Garage and Machine Shop, the 1927 Bauer-Koller auto showroom, the 1937 Gonring's Tavern, and the 1964 Contemporary-style Schober building.
30	West Bend Post Office	West Bend Post Office	October 24, 2000 (#00001254)	607 Elm St. 43°25′28″N 88°11′01″W	West Bend	1-story brick building built in Georgian Revival style in 1935. The lobby features a 1937 mural "The Rural Mail Carrier" by Peter Rotier.
31	West Bend Theater	West Bend Theater	September 14, 2020 (#100005005)	125 North Main St. 43°25′26″N 88°10′58″W	West Bend	Art Deco-styled theater built in 1929. Designed by Graven and Mayger of Chicago for both movies and vaudeville, with a full stage and dressing rooms for performers.

== See also ==
- List of National Historic Landmarks in Wisconsin
- National Register of Historic Places listings in Wisconsin
- Listings in neighboring counties: Dodge, Fond du Lac, Milwaukee, Ozaukee, Sheboygan, Waukesha
