= Wisconsin Highway 84 =

State highway in Wisconsin, USA

State Trunk Highway 84

Route information
- Maintained by WisDOT

Major junctions
- West end: WIS 28 / WIS 144 in Boltonville
- East end: I-43 / WIS 32 in Fillmore

Location
- Country: United States
- State: Wisconsin
- Counties: Washington, Ozaukee

Highway system
- Wisconsin State Trunk Highway System; Interstate; US; State; Scenic; Rustic
← WIS 83	→ WIS 85

State Trunk Highway 84 (often called Highway 84, STH-84 or WIS 84) was a state highway in Washington County and Ozaukee counties. The highway ran between Boltonville and Port Washington.

== History ==
WIS 84 originally ran east–west between Boltonville and Port Washington (in Ozaukee County), via Fredonia. The road was turned over to the counties in two stages in the 1990s. The first stage removed the route between Port Washington and Fillmore, and in 1992, the remainder was turned back as Washington County Trunk Hwy H, but it is unclear when the signs were removed.

== Major intersections ==
County	Location	mi	km	Destinations	Notes
Washington	Boltonville			WIS 28 / WIS 144	
Ozaukee	Fredonia			WIS 57	
Ozaukee	Port Washington			I-43 north / WIS 32 WIS 32 south	Roadway continued as WIS 32
1.000 mi = 1.609 km; 1.000 km = 0.621 mi
