= Wisconsin Highway 144 =

State highway in Washington and Sheboygan counties in Wisconsin, United States

State Trunk Highway 144
- WIS 144 highlighted in red

Route information
- Maintained by WisDOT
- Length: 27.63 mi (44.47 km)
- Tourist routes: Kettle Moraine Scenic Drive

Major junctions
- South end: I-41 / US 41 in Slinger
- US 45 in West Bend
- North end: WIS 57 in Random Lake

Location
- Country: United States
- State: Wisconsin
- Counties: Washington, Sheboygan

Highway system
- Wisconsin State Trunk Highway System; Interstate; US; State; Scenic; Rustic
← WIS 143	→ WIS 145

State Trunk Highway 144 (often called Highway 144, STH-144 or WIS 144) is a state highway in southeastern Wisconsin, United States, that runs roughly north–south from Slinger to Random Lake.

== Route description ==
Starting at Interstate 41/US Highway 41 (I-41/US 41) at a diamond interchange, WIS 144 proceeds to travel northward. Also, the Kettle Moraine Scenic Drive runs concurrently with part of the highway. It travels adjacent to Big Cedar Lake. After that, in Nabob, the highway then meets WIS 33. At this point, WIS 144 turns east along WIS 33 while the latter continues straight. In West Bend, WIS 33/WIS 144 then meets US 45 at a diamond interchange. Then, in downtown West Bend, WIS 144 branches off northward along the riverfront of Milwaukee River. Then, it crosses above that river. Continuing on, it travels northeastward through Orchard Grove. It then begins to run concurrently with WIS 28 and then going through Boltonville before ending the concurrency. At this point, WIS 144 turns east, traveling through Silver Creek and Random Lake before intersecting WIS 57. At that point, the highway ends.

== Major intersections ==
County	Location	mi	km	Destinations	Notes
Washington	Slinger	0.0	0.0	I-41 / US 41 – Fond du Lac, Milwaukee	
Washington	Town of West Bend	5.7	9.2	WIS 33 west – Allenton, Horicon	Western end of WIS 33 overlap
Washington	West Bend	8.4	13.5	US 45 – Kewaskum, Milwaukee	
Washington	West Bend	9.6	15.4	WIS 33 east (Washington St.)	Eastern end of WIS 33 overlap
Washington	Town of Farmington	17.0	27.4	WIS 28 west – Kewaskum	Western end of WIS 28 overlap
Sheboygan	Town of Scott	20.7	33.3	WIS 28 east – Cascade, Sheboygan	Eastern end of WIS 28 overlap
Sheboygan	Random Lake	27.63	44.47	WIS 57 – Plymouth, Milwaukee	
1.000 mi = 1.609 km; 1.000 km = 0.621 mi: Concurrency terminus; Incomplete access
