= Trenton, Washington County, Wisconsin =

Town in Washington County, Wisconsin

Trenton, Wisconsin
- Town
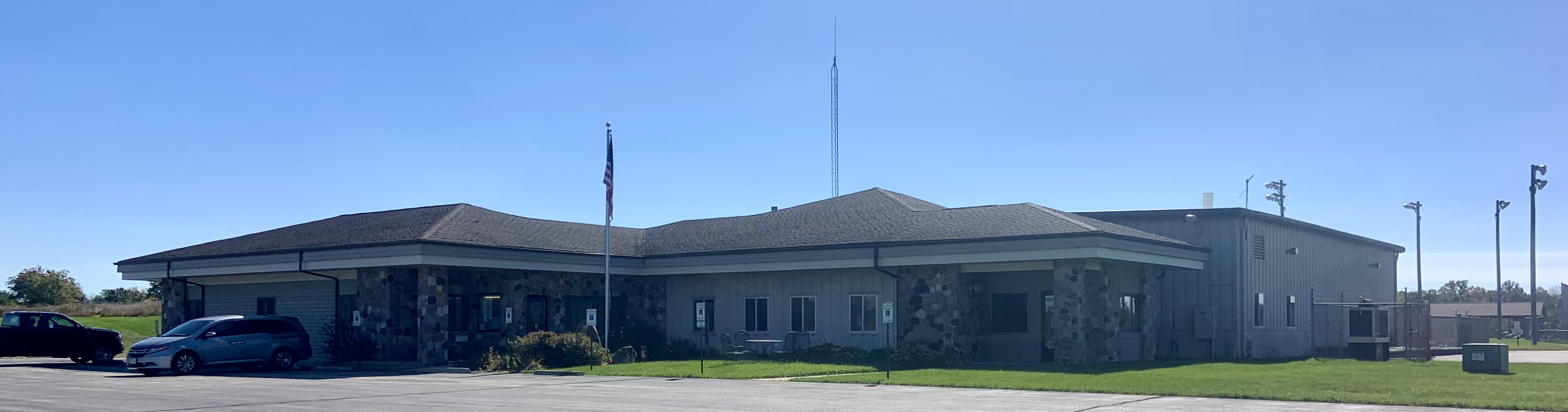
- Town hall

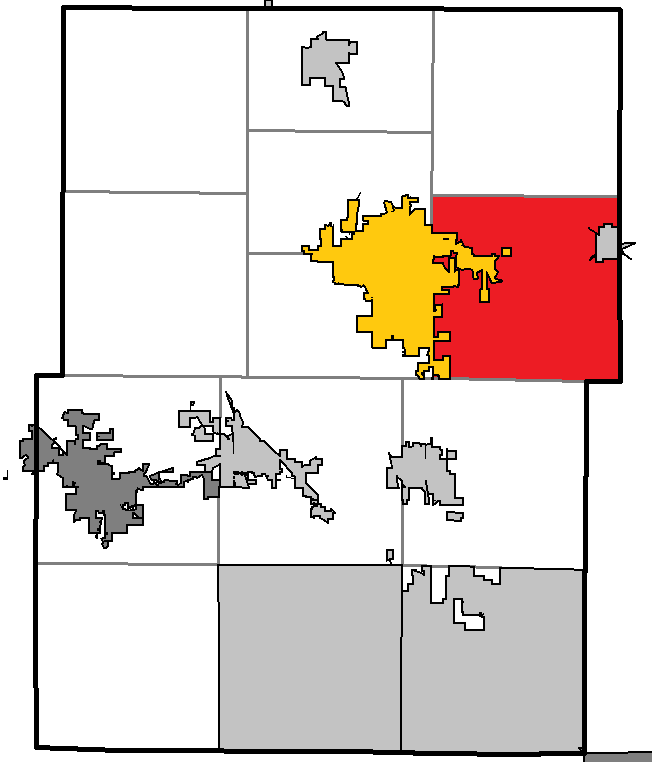
- Location of Trenton, within Washington County, Wisconsin
- Coordinates: 43°25′3″N 88°6′32″W
- Country: United States
- State: Wisconsin
- County: Washington
- Incorporated: March 11, 1848; 178 years ago

Area
  - Total: 33.5 sq mi (86.7 km^{2})
  - Land: 33.4 sq mi (86.5 km^{2})
  - Water: 0.077 sq mi (0.2 km^{2})
- Elevation: 899 ft (274 m)

Population (2020)
  - Total: 4,525
  - Density: 135/sq mi (52.3/km^{2})
- Time zone: UTC-6 (Central (CST))
  - Summer (DST): UTC-5 (CDT)
- Area code: 262
- FIPS code: 55-80575
- GNIS feature ID: 1584294
- Website: www.townoftrenton.info

Trenton is a town in Washington County, Wisconsin, United States. The population was 4,525 at the 2020 census. The hamlet of Myra is located within the town.

== Geography ==
The Milwaukee River bisects the Town of Trenton. The north branch of Cedar Creek runs through the town. Wallace Lake is in the northwestern corner of the town on the boundary with the Town of Barton.

According to the United States Census Bureau, the town has a total area of 33.5 square miles (86.7 km^{2}), of which 33.4 square miles (86.5 km^{2}) is land and 0.1 square mile (0.2 km^{2}) (0.21%) is water.

== History ==
Potawatomi and Menominee Native Americans lived along the Milwaukee River until the 1830s. In 1836, land speculators, including Milwaukee founder Solomon Juneau bought land in what would become the Town of Trenton. However, permanent settlers did not arrive in the area until 1845. Many of the early settlers were German immigrant farmers. Dairy farming has been the main economic activity for much of the town's history, and the Wallau Dairy Company of West Bend operated a large cheese factory on the town's west side in the 19th and early 20th centuries.

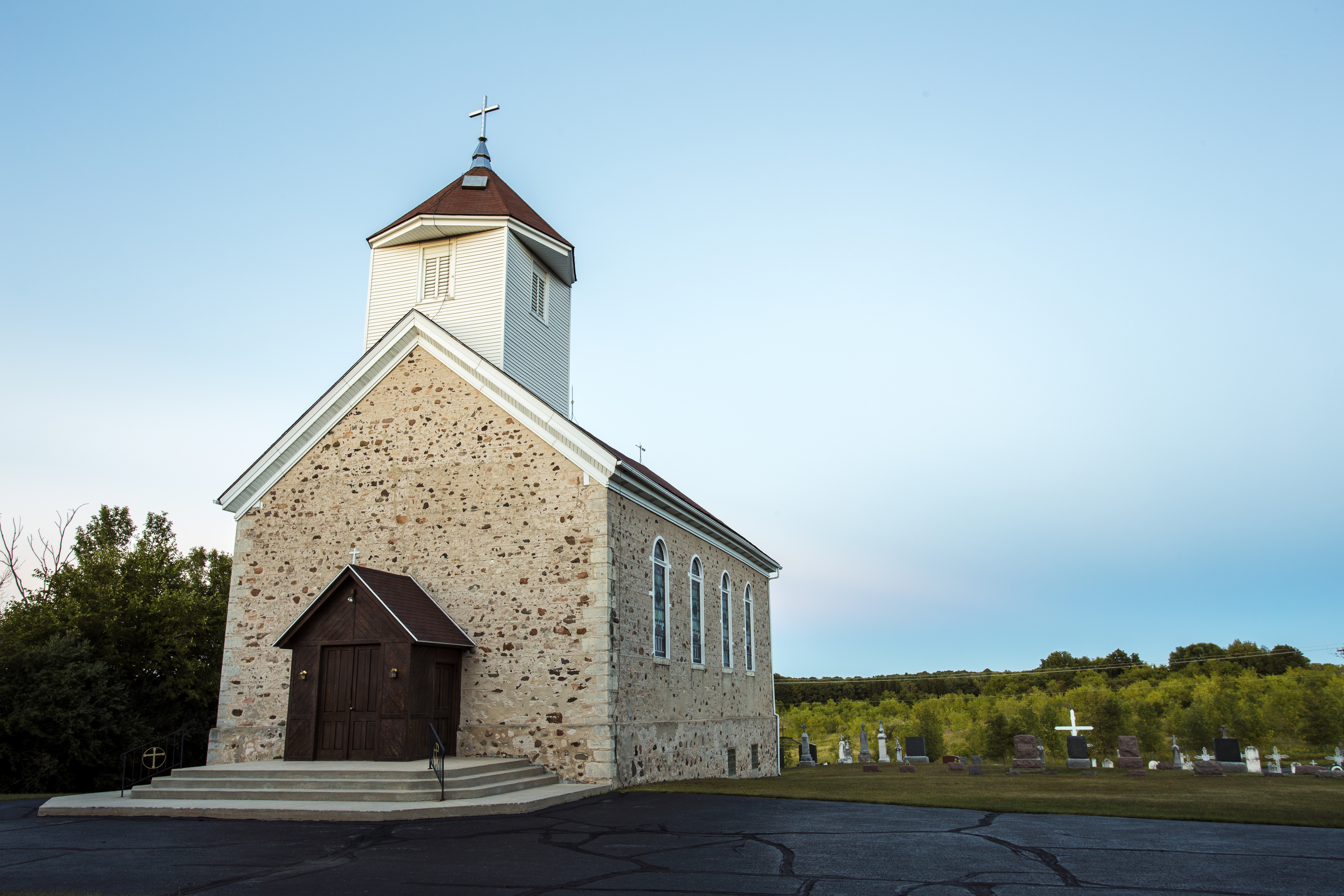
St. Augustine Catholic Church and Cemetery was founded by a community of immigrants from Bavaria in 1856. Sermons were in German into the 1940s. The building is listed on the National Register of Historic Places.

The Town of Trenton was incorporated on March 11, 1848.

In 1848, Barton Salisbury built a dam on the Milwaukee River to generate power for his feed and saw mills. The area around his mills would become the Village of Newburg, the most significant settlement in Trenton.

As early as 1848, a group of Free Will Baptists from New England settled in northwestern Trenton, near Wallace Lake. They were led by Reverend Comfort Babcock Waller, who also founded a Free Will Baptist community in Scott, Sheboygan County, Wisconsin. The group performed immersion baptisms on the lake's northeastern shore, even going so far as to cut holes in the ice to baptize their members in the dead of winter. The community members dispersed in the 1860s; some of them established a new church in nearby Boltonville in 1872.

In November 1862 during the American Civil War, the draft was unpopular with some residents. On the day Trenton men were being drafted at the courthouse in West Bend, a mob disrupted the proceedings and forced the draft commissioner to flee to Milwaukee. On November 22, 1862, the commissioner returned to West Bend with six companies of the 30th Wisconsin Volunteer Infantry Regiment to prevent further disruptions.

Bohemian immigrants settled in the community of Myra in the 19th century.

In the 20th century, Trenton lost some of its geographic area when the neighboring City of West Bend annexed land for residential subdivisions, commercial developments and the West Bend Municipal Airport. Additionally, Newburg incorporated as a village in 1973 out of the town's land.

In the 21st century, Trenton has become a commuter town with approximately half of its residents working outside Washington County.

== Demographics ==
As of the census of 2000, there were 4,440 people, 1,520 households, and 1,287 families residing in the town. The population density was 133.0 people per square mile (51.3/km^{2}). There were 1,562 housing units at an average density of 46.8 per square mile (18.1/km^{2}). The racial makeup of the town was 98.74% White, 0.18% African American, 0.20% Native American, 0.14% Asian, 0.38% from other races, and 0.36% from two or more races. Hispanic or Latino of any race were 1.10% of the population.

There were 1,520 households, out of which 38.8% had children under the age of 18 living with them, 76.8% were married couples living together, 4.7% had a female householder with no husband present, and 15.3% were non-families. 11.8% of all households were made up of individuals, and 3.5% had someone living alone who was 65 years of age or older. The average household size was 2.91 and the average family size was 3.17.

In the town, the population diversity was 26.6% under the age of 18, 7.2% from 18 to 24, 28.5% from 25 to 44, 28.4% from 45 to 64, and 9.2% who were 65 years of age or older. The median age was 39 years. For every 100 females, there were 111.3 males. For every 100 females age 18 and over, there were 108.2 males.

The median income for a household in the town was $66,213, and the median income for a family was $70,154. Males had a median income of $45,570 versus $28,272 for females. The per capita income for the town was $24,767. About 1.4% of families and 2.9% of the population were below the poverty line, including 3.0% of those under age 18 and 6.2% of those age 65 or over.
