= Cascade, Wisconsin =

- Village
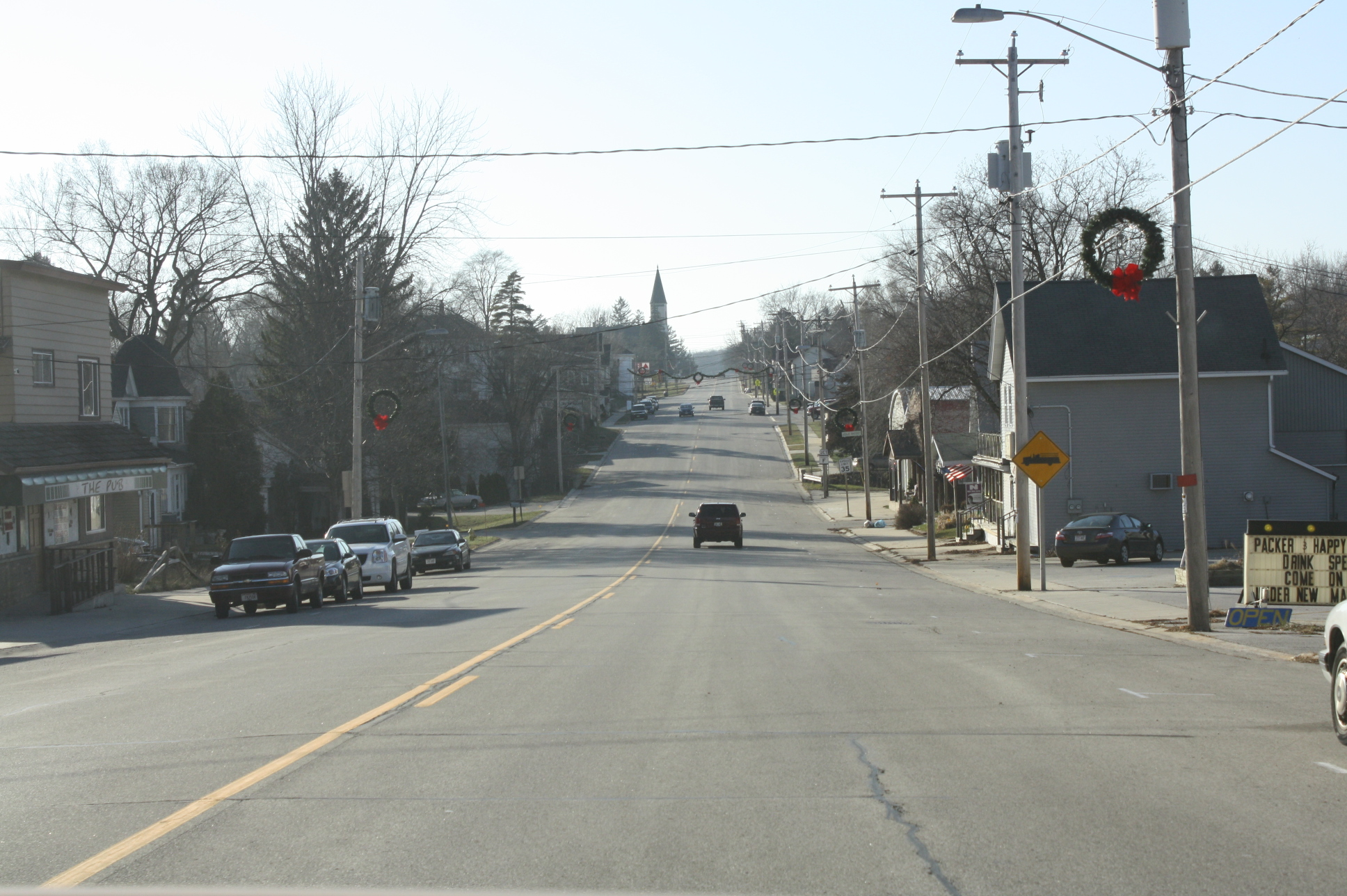
- Looking west in downtown Cascade

- Location of Cascade in Sheboygan County, Wisconsin.
- Coordinates: 43°39′31″N 88°0′30″W
- Country: United States
- State: Wisconsin
- County: Sheboygan

Area
  - Total: 0.84 sq mi (2.17 km^{2})
  - Land: 0.82 sq mi (2.13 km^{2})
  - Water: 0.015 sq mi (0.04 km^{2})
- Elevation: 869 ft (265 m)

Population (2020)
  - Total: 722
  - Density: 878/sq mi (339/km^{2})
- Time zone: UTC-6 (Central (CST))
  - Summer (DST): UTC-5 (CDT)
- Area code: 920
- FIPS code: 55-12825
- GNIS feature ID: 1562757
- Website: Village of Cascade

Cascade is a village in Sheboygan County, Wisconsin, United States. The population was 722 at the 2020 census. It is included in the Sheboygan, Wisconsin Metropolitan Statistical Area.

== History ==
With the construction of two 100-kilowatt wind turbines in June 2010, Cascade became the first community in Wisconsin to use locally produced wind energy to power its municipal wastewater treatment plant.

== Transportation ==
Wisconsin Highway 28 passes through Cascade.

== Geography ==
According to the United States Census Bureau, the village has a total area of 0.82 square miles (2.12 km^{2}), of which 0.81 square miles (2.10 km^{2}) is land and 0.01 square miles (0.03 km^{2}) is water.

== Demographics ==
Historical population
Census	Pop.	Note	%±
1880	255		—
1920	362		—
1930	286		−21.0%
1940	358		25.2%
1950	403		12.6%
1960	449		11.4%
1970	603		34.3%
1980	615		2.0%
1990	620		0.8%
2000	666		7.4%
2010	709		6.5%
2020	722		1.8%
U.S. Decennial Census

=== 2010 census ===
As of the census of 2010, there were 709 people, 274 households, and 206 families living in the village. The population density was 875.3 inhabitants per square mile (338.0/km^{2}). There were 291 housing units at an average density of 359.3 per square mile (138.7/km^{2}). The racial makeup of the village was 97.7% White, 0.4% African American, 0.3% Native American, 0.4% Pacific Islander, 0.7% from other races, and 0.4% from two or more races. Hispanic or Latino of any race were 3.8% of the population.

There were 274 households, of which 35.8% had children under the age of 18 living with them, 58.0% were married couples living together, 9.9% had a female householder with no husband present, 7.3% had a male householder with no wife present, and 24.8% were non-families. 20.1% of all households were made up of individuals, and 9.5% had someone living alone who was 65 years of age or older. The average household size was 2.59 and the average family size was 2.93.

The median age in the village was 39.2 years. 24.8% of residents were under the age of 18; 7.4% were between the ages of 18 and 24; 25.5% were from 25 to 44; 30.8% were from 45 to 64; and 11.3% were 65 years of age or older. The gender makeup of the village was 51.9% male and 48.1% female.

=== 2000 census ===
As of the census of 2000, there were 666 people, 255 households, and 190 families living in the village. The population density was 895.8 people per square mile (347.5/km^{2}). There were 269 housing units at an average density of 361.8 per square mile (140.4/km^{2}). The racial makeup of the village was 98.80% White, 0.15% African American, 0.90% Native American, and 0.15% from two or more races. Hispanic or Latino of any race were 1.65% of the population.

There were 255 households, out of which 34.9% had children under the age of 18 living with them, 65.9% were married couples living together, 6.7% had a female householder with no husband present, and 25.1% were non-families. 22.4% of all households were made up of individuals, and 9.4% had someone living alone who was 65 years of age or older. The average household size was 2.61 and the average family size was 3.06.

In the village, the population was spread out, with 25.8% under the age of 18, 7.2% from 18 to 24, 30.9% from 25 to 44, 21.6% from 45 to 64, and 14.4% who were 65 years of age or older. The median age was 37 years. For every 100 females, there were 102.4 males. For every 100 females age 18 and over, there were 94.5 males.

The median income for a household in the village was $47,232, and the median income for a family was $52,500. Males had a median income of $38,214 versus $25,139 for females. The per capita income for the village was $20,617. About 4.3% of families and 6.6% of the population were below the poverty line, including 15.2% of those under age 18 and none of those age 65 or over.

== Notable people ==
- George H. Brickner, politician and businessman
- Cadwallader Humphrey, politician
- Daniel LeMahieu, politician
- Albert J. Reiss, sociologist

== Images ==
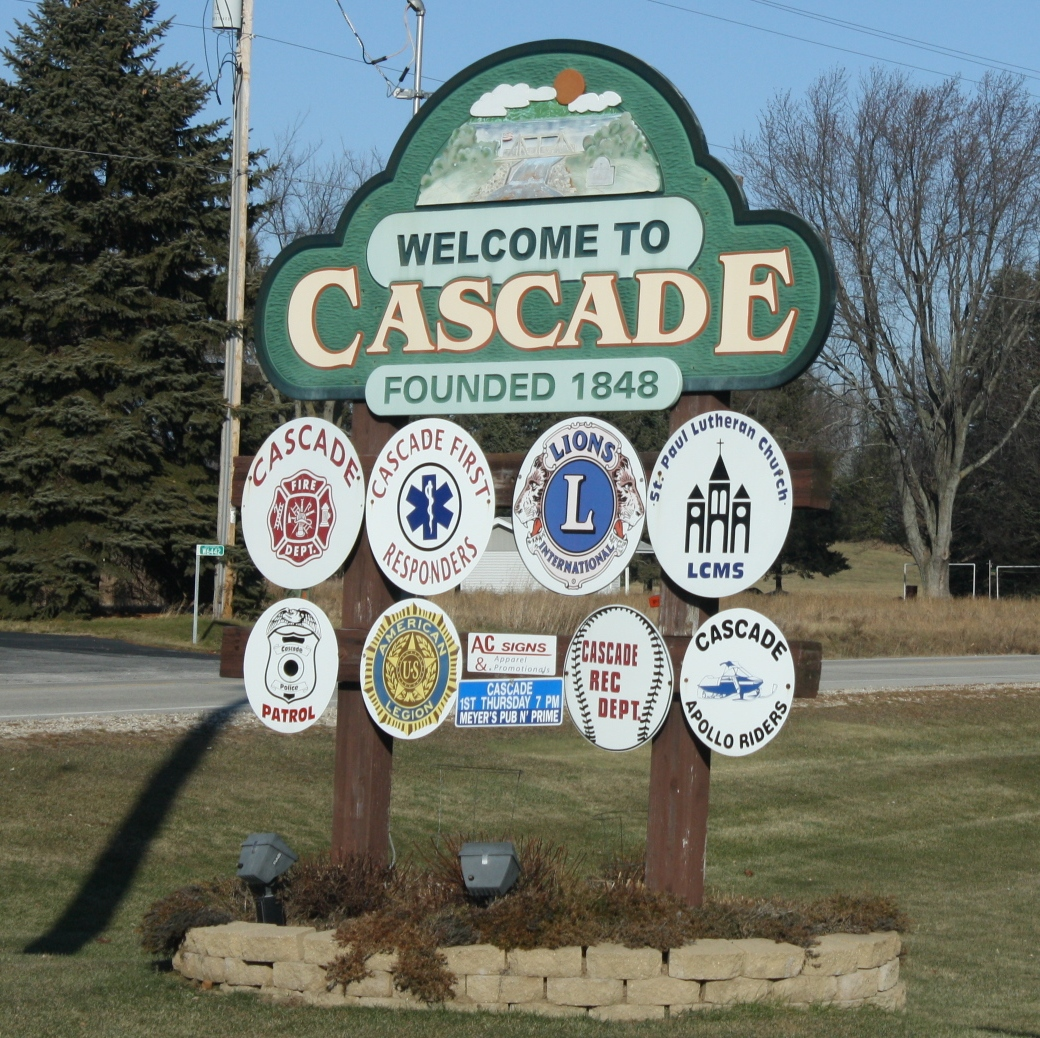
Cascade sign

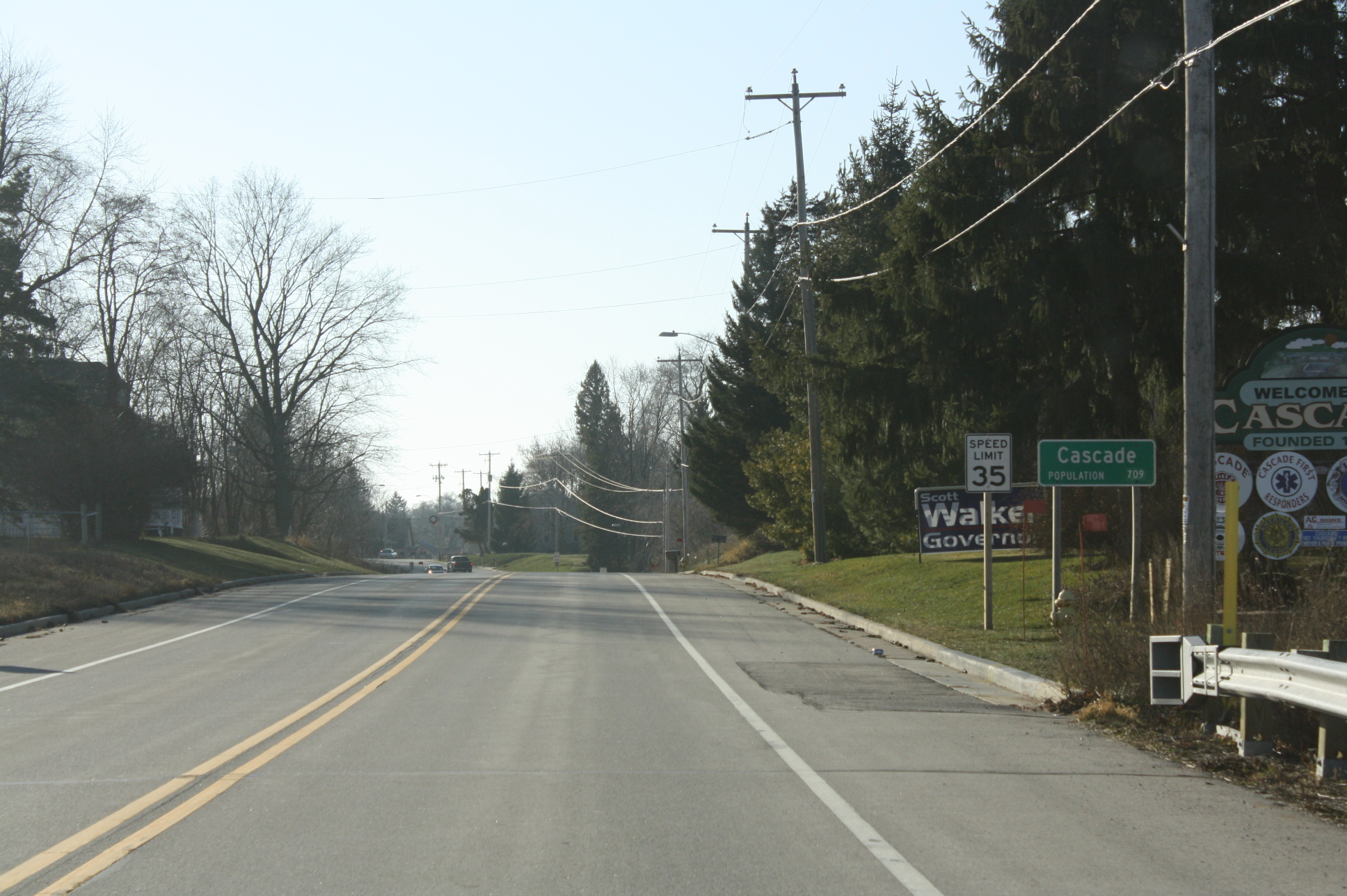
Looking west at the sign for Cascade on WIS 28
