= Farmington, Washington County, Wisconsin =

Town in Washington County, Wisconsin

Farmington, Wisconsin
- Town
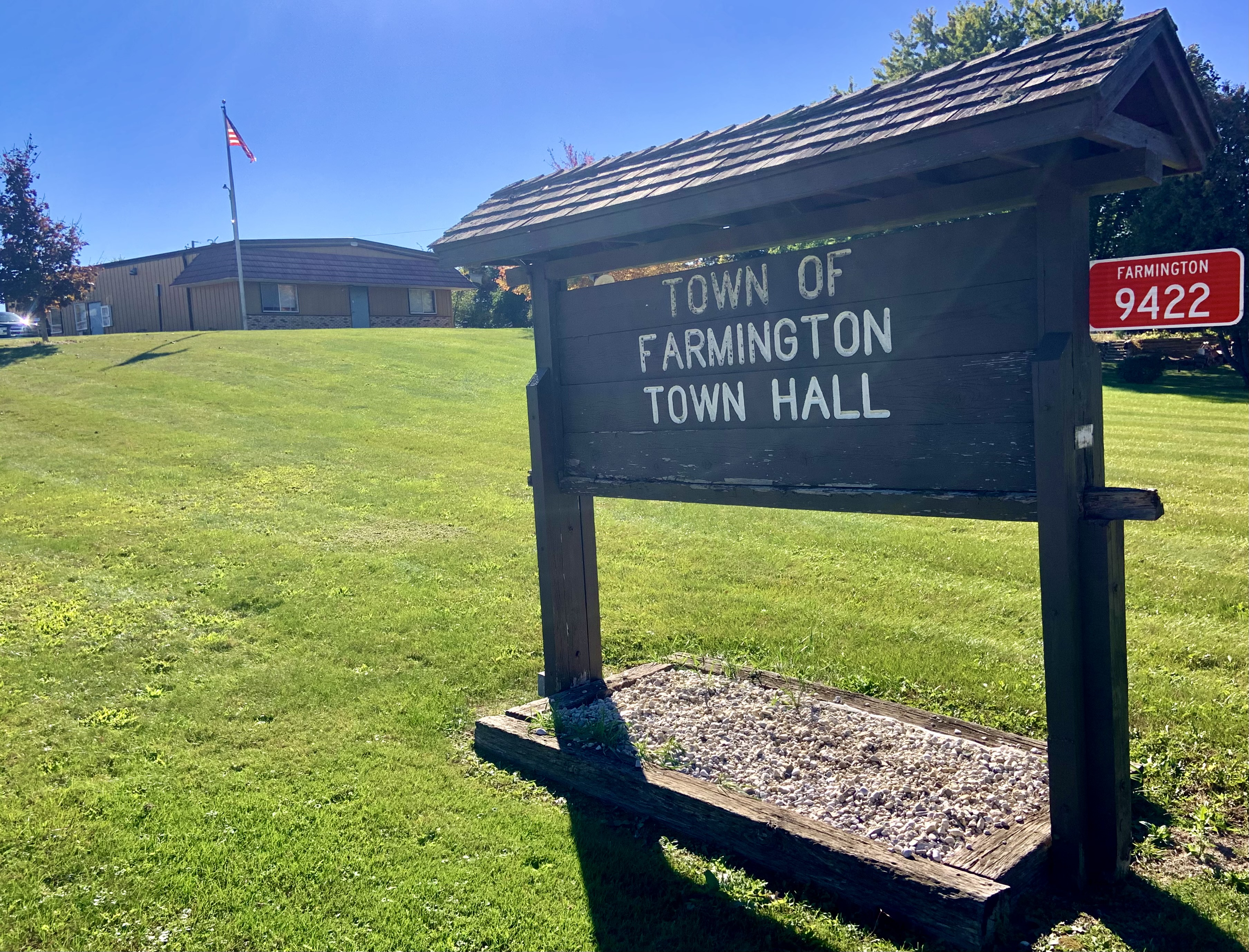
- Town hall along WIS 28 in Boltonville

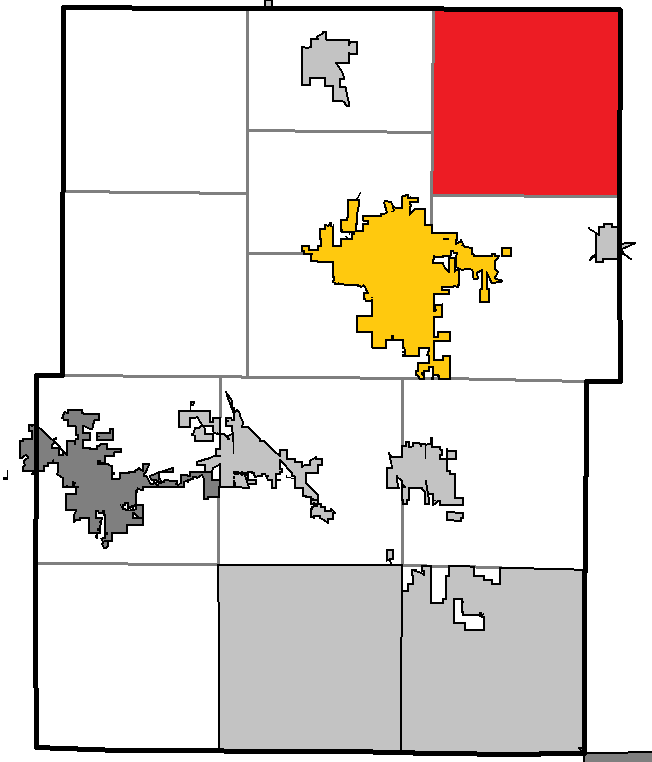
- Location of Farmington, within Washington County, Wisconsin
- Coordinates: 43°30′20″N 88°5′45″W
- Country: United States
- State: Wisconsin
- County: Washington
- Incorporated: February 11, 1847; 179 years ago

Government
  - Chairperson: Doug Neumann

Area
  - Total: 36.7 sq mi (95.0 km^{2})
  - Land: 36.4 sq mi (94.2 km^{2})
  - Water: 0.31 sq mi (0.8 km^{2})
- Elevation: 896 ft (273 m)

Population (2020)
  - Total: 3,645
  - Density: 100/sq mi (38.7/km^{2})
- Time zone: UTC-6 (Central (CST))
  - Summer (DST): UTC-5 (CDT)
- Area code: 262
- FIPS code: 55-25375
- GNIS feature ID: 1583193
- Website: town.farmington.wi.us

Farmington is a town in Washington County, Wisconsin, United States. The population was 3,645 at the 2020 census. The unincorporated communities of Boltonville, Cheeseville, Fillmore, and Orchard Grove are located in the town. The unincorporated community of Saint Michaels is also located partially in the town.

== Geography ==
Farmington is located in the Kettle Moraine region of Wisconsin, home to unique geographical features formed by the Laurentide Ice Sheet, a massive glacier that covered much of Canada and the northern United States during the prehistoric Wisconsin glaciation. The town contains many kames, eskers, drumlins, kettles, rivers, and streams created by the glacier.

The north branch of the Milwaukee River flows through the town, as do Stony Creek and Wallace Creek. The town's lakes, including Ehne Lake, Erler Lake, Green Lake, Lake Twelve, and Miller Lake, were are kettle lakes, created by the glaciers.

According to the United States Census Bureau, the town has a total area of 36.7 square miles (95.0 km^{2}), of which 36.4 square miles (94.2 km^{2}) is land and 0.3 square mile (0.8 km^{2}) (0.82%) is water.

== History ==
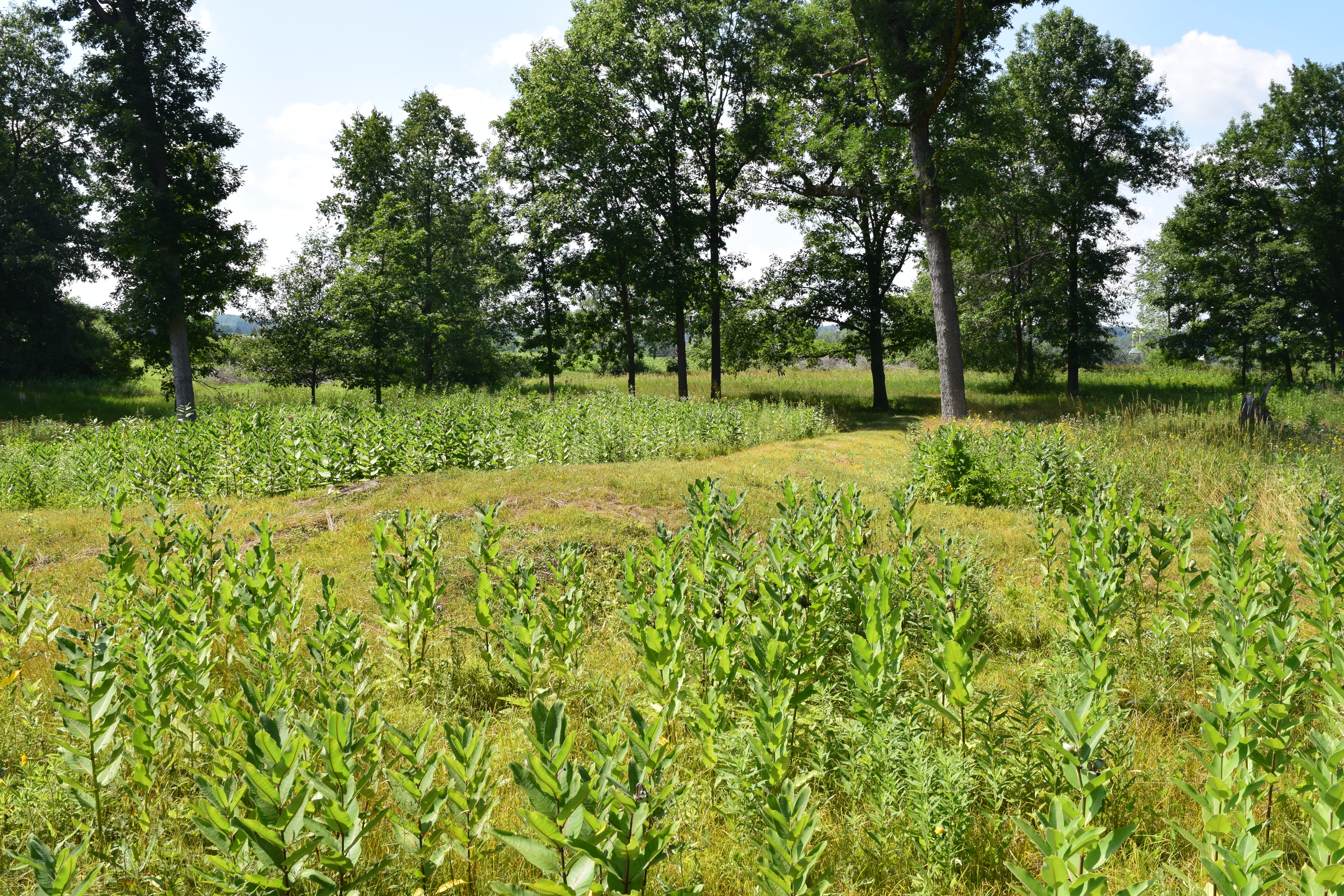
A mound in Lizard Mound County Park.

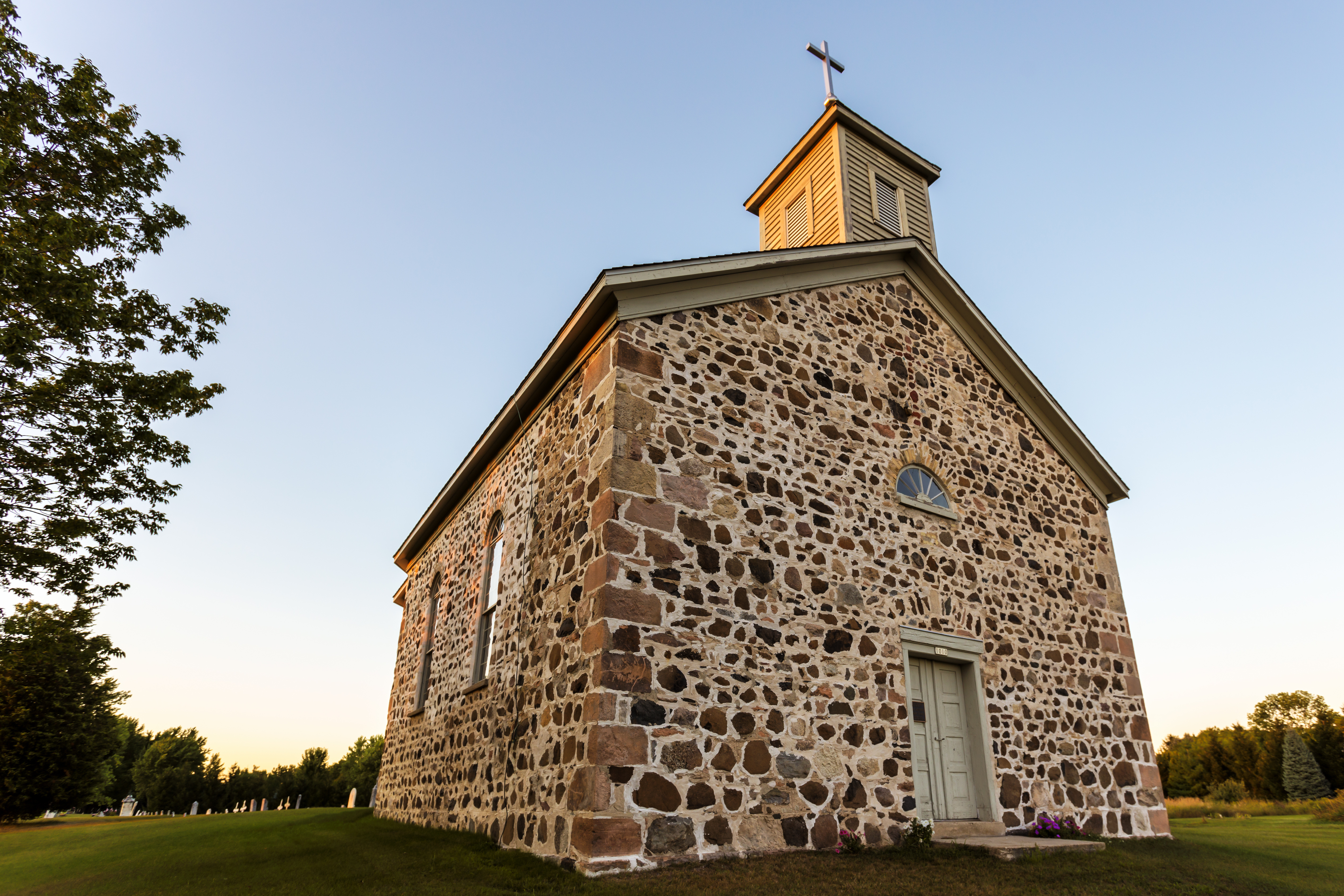
St. Peter's Church was constructed in southern Farmington in 1861 by a congregation of German Catholic farmers. The building is listed on the National Register of Historic Places.

The Farmington area's earliest known inhabitants were pre-Columbian Mound Builders, who constructed effigy mounds sometime between 650 CE and 1300 CE. They survived by hunting, fishing, and gathering wild plants. They constructed tools from bone, wood, stone, and occasionally copper. They also made pottery. They were semi-nomadic. They built effigy mounds shaped like mammals, reptiles, birds and other creatures, both real and mythical, as well as conical, oval, and linear mounds, some of which contain human burials. At least forty-seven mounds, known as the Hagner Group, existed in Farmington. Some mounds were destroyed by white settlers to create farm fields, but twenty-eight survive as of 2020 in Lizard Mound County Park.

In the early 19th century, Farmington was home to Potawatomi and Menominee Native Americans. The Menominee surrendered their claims to the land to the United States Federal Government in 1831 through the Treaty of Washington. The Potawatomi surrendered the land the United States Federal Government in 1833 through the 1833 Treaty of Chicago, which (after being ratified in 1835) required them to leave Wisconsin by 1838. While many Native people moved west of the Mississippi River to Kansas, some chose to remain, and were referred to as "strolling Potawatomi" in contemporary documents because many of them were migrants who subsisted by squatting on their ancestral lands, which were now owned by white settlers. Eventually the Native Americans who evaded forced removal gathered in northern Wisconsin, where they formed the Forest County Potawatomi Community.

Farmington was part of the Town of West Bend until February 11, 1847, when the Wisconsin Territorial legislature created the Town of Clarence, which was renamed the Town of Farmington on March 11, 1848. The early settlers were predominantly German and Irish immigrants.

In the early 1850s, a group of immigrants from Saxony established Fillmore in the eastern part of the town. They named the settlement for Millard Fillmore, who was president at the time. Fillmore is the location of the 1855 Saxonia House brewery, which was a gathering place for locals. In 1862, some of the Saxon immigrants organized the Farmington Turnverein, a German cultural association, and in 1868, they built the Fillmore Turner Hall, which still stands as of 2020.

In 1854, Harlow Bolton established the Boltonville settlement on Stony Creek in the northeastern part of the town. The early settlers used the creek to power grist and saw mills. There was also a cheese factory, as well as shops, a post office, and a school.

In the 19th and 20th centuries, dairy farming was widespread in Farmington, leading to the construction of numerous cheese factories, including an 1871 factory in Orchard Grove and an 1881 factory in Cheeseville.

Farmington saw significant population growth in the final decades of the 20th century and the first decades of the 21st century. The economy is still primarily agricultural, with roughly 60% of the land devoted to farming.

=== Historic Places ===
Farmington is home to four sites listed on the National Register of Historic Places:

- Lizard Mound County Park: A well-preserved cluster of twenty-eight pre-Columbian effigy mounds, including a 250-foot lizard mound, similarly sized panther and bird mounds, and smaller linear and conical mounds.
- Saxonia House: In 1855, immigrants from the Kingdom of Saxony built Saxonia House as an inn and brewery in Fillmore. Constructed with a traditionally German half-timbered-under-stucco technique, the building also contains an 1860 brewery cave with a vaulted brick ceiling for lagering and storing beer.
- St. John of God Roman Catholic Church, Convent, and School: The church was built near Boltonville in 1891 and served a predominately Irish congregation. The site includes a cemetery and the nearby ruins of an 1868 convent and school of the Sisters of St. Agnes.
- St. Peter's Church: German Catholic farmers constructed St. Peter's Church from fieldstone in 1861 and also built a nearby school in 1874.

== Demographics ==
As of the census of 2000, there were 3,239 people, 1,116 households, and 945 families residing in the town. The population density was 89.0 people per square mile (34.4/km^{2}). There were 1,183 housing units at an average density of 32.5 per square mile (12.6/km^{2}). The racial makeup of the town was 99.17% White, 0.09% African American, 0.22% Native American, 0.09% Asian, 0.03% Pacific Islander, and 0.40% from two or more races. Hispanic or Latino of any race were 0.90% of the population.

There were 1,116 households, out of which 38.6% had children under the age of 18 living with them, 77.8% were married couples living together, 3.9% had a female householder with no husband present, and 15.3% were non-families. 11.4% of all households were made up of individuals, and 3.9% had someone living alone who was 65 years of age or older. The average household size was 2.90 and the average family size was 3.14.

In the town, the population was spread out, with 27.4% under the age of 18, 6.4% from 18 to 24, 31.9% from 25 to 44, 25.8% from 45 to 64, and 8.5% who were 65 years of age or older. The median age was 38 years. For every 100 females, there were 104.5 males. For every 100 females age 18 and over, there were 106.6 males.

The median income for a household in the town was $61,667, and the median income for a family was $63,508. Males had a median income of $41,953 versus $25,595 for females. The per capita income for the town was $23,082. About 1.9% of families and 3.5% of the population were below the poverty line, including 7.3% of those under age 18 and 1.2% of those age 65 or over.

== Parks ==
- Leonard J. Yahr County Park: Once the site of a sawmill and match factory, the park now contains hiking trails and a public beach on the shore of Erler Lake.
- Lizard Mound County Park: The park contains self guided walking trail through a collection of twenty-eight earthen mounds in animal and geometric shapes built between 1,000–1,500 years ago by Native Americans.
