= Gadow's Mill =

- U.S. National Register of Historic Places
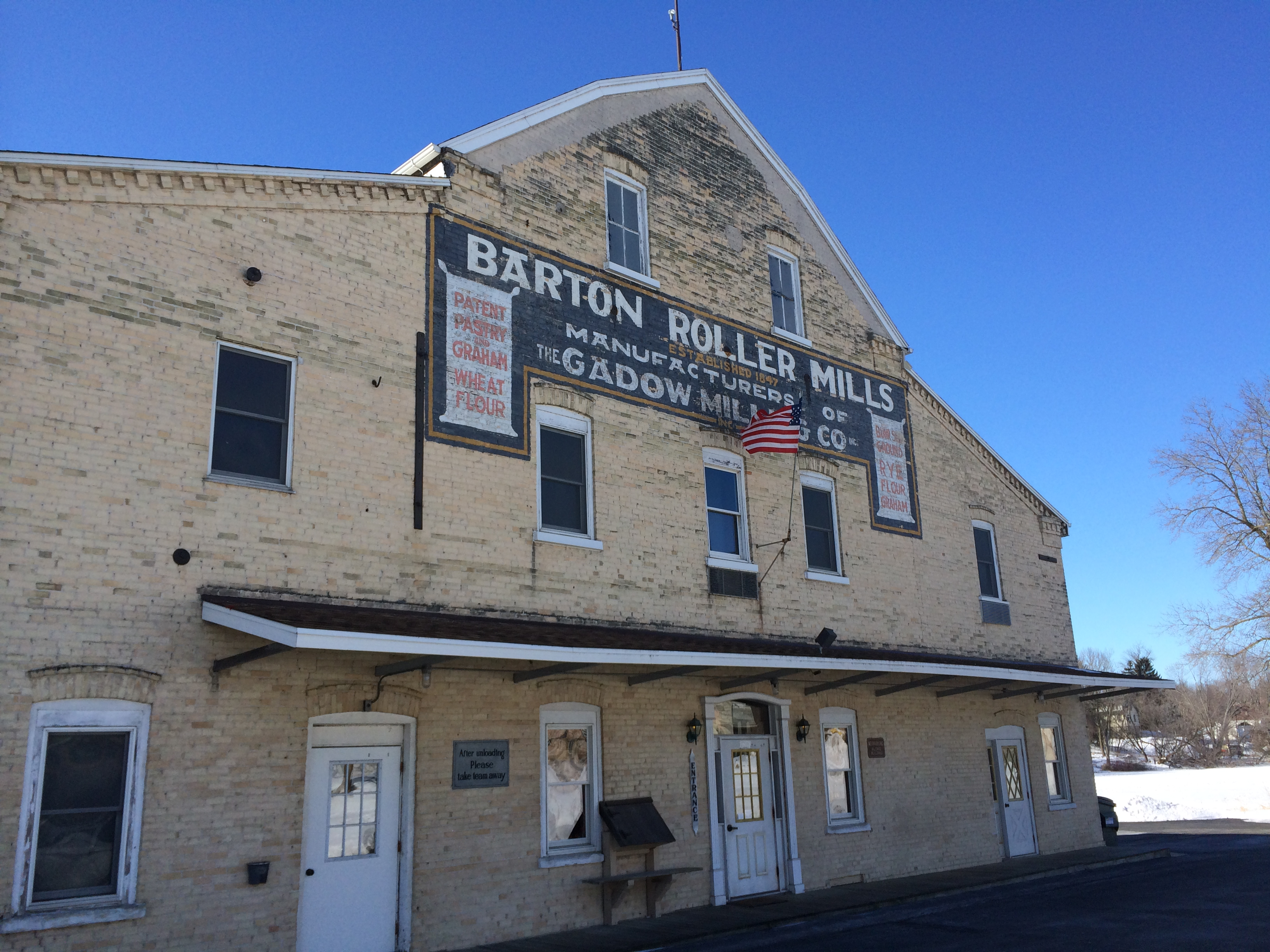
- The mill in February 2015

- Location within Wisconsin Location within the United States
- Location: 1784 Barton Avenue; West Bend, Wisconsin, U.S.
- Coordinates: 43°26′33″N 88°10′52″W
- Area: less than one acre
- Built: 1843
- Architect: Robert Price
- NRHP reference No.: 74000136
- Added to NRHP: December 24, 1974

Gadow's Mill (Barton Roller Mills) is a former grist mill on the Milwaukee River in West Bend, Wisconsin, United States, that is listed on the National Register of Historic Places (NRHP).

== Description ==
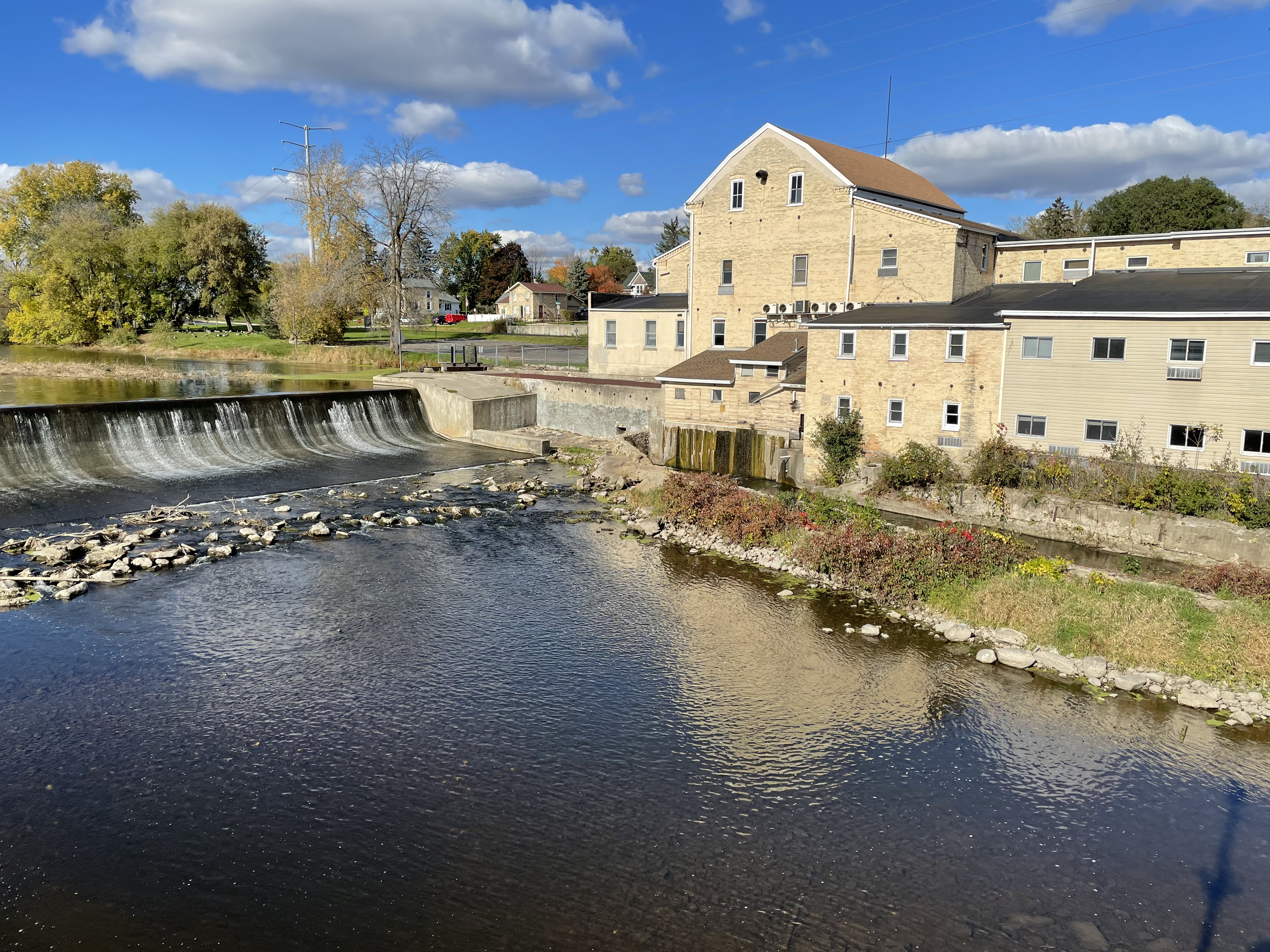
Gadow's Mill, October 2021

In 1843, Robert Price built a sawmill on the Milwaukee River. When completed, the mill measured sixty-five by forty-four feet (20 by 13 m), and was two and one half stories high. In 1847, the mill was converted to grind wheat into flour and Price renamed the facility as the Barton Roller Mills. For many years Washington County farmers brought their wheat to Price's mill where it was ground, packed into wooden barrels, and shipped by wagon to Allenton from where it was then shipped by rail to larger markets.

Barton Roller Mills remained active into the 1890s. During this time ownership of the building changed hands several times. In 1894, Mr. and Mrs. Charles Suckow of Milwaukee purchased the mill. In 1900, Mr. Suckow erected a new elevator (not extant) on the east side of the mill. William F. Gadow acquired a majority interest in the mill in 1905. Nine years later fire destroyed most of the equipment and some of the structure itself. Gadow turned this misfortune into an opportunity to update his mill. That year he replaced the lost machinery with five new Allis-Chalmers rollers for wheat, five mills for rye, and a French Burr Stone which was used to produce coarsely ground flour. The mill remained in the Gadow family until 1964, at which time the owners discontinued operations.

In 1966, the city of West Bend purchased the mill, and in 1975, the city turned the building over to Leonard S. Dricken (son-in-law of Walter A. Gadow) who would later restore the mill. The Gadow mill was the last mill in Wisconsin to grind wheat flour and also one of the last to operate on water power.

== See also ==
- National Register of Historic Places listings in Washington County, Wisconsin
