= Wisconsin Highway 143 =

Former state highway in Washington and Ozaukee counties in Wisconsin, United States

State Trunk Highway 143
- WIS 143 highlighted in red

Route information
- Maintained by WisDOT
- Length: 7.5 mi (12.1 km)

Major junctions
- West end: US 45 south of West Bend
- East end: WIS 57 in Cedarburg

Location
- Country: United States
- State: Wisconsin
- Counties: Washington, Ozaukee

Highway system
- Wisconsin State Trunk Highway System; Interstate; US; State; Scenic; Rustic
| ← WIS 142 | → WIS 144 |

State Trunk Highway 143 (often called Highway 143, STH-143 or WIS 143) was a 7.5-mile (12.1 km) state highway in Washington and Ozaukee counties in Wisconsin, United States, that ran east–west between south of West Bend and Cedarburg.

== History ==
Initially, in 1923, WIS 143 ran along Washington Avenue from WIS 57 (now Columbia Road) in Cedarburg to WIS 60 northwest of Cedarburg. Nothing significant had changed to the routing until 1947. At that point, WIS 143 was extended northwest to US 45/WIS 55 (now CTH-P) in the middle of Jackson and West Bend, superseding CTH-N in the process. By 1987, WIS 143 extended westward along present-day CTH-P and CTH-PV after US 45 was rerouted westward onto a bypass.

Prior to 1997, the Ozaukee County section of the highway was turned over to the county and Cedarburg (replaced by CTH-NN outside of Cedarburg), leaving the section in Washington County. The rest of the road was turned over to local control in 1997, and is now designated as multiple county highways.

== Major intersections ==
| County | Location | mi | km | Destinations | Notes |
|---|---|---|---|---|---|
| Washington | Jackson–Polk– West Bend town tripoint | | | US 45 | |
| Ozaukee | Cedarburg | | | WIS 60 | |
| Ozaukee | Cedarburg | | | WIS 181 south | |
| Ozaukee | Cedarburg | | | WIS 57 | |
1.000 mi = 1.609 km; 1.000 km = 0.621 mi
