= Myra, Wisconsin =

- Unincorporated community
- Location within the state of Wisconsin
- Coordinates: 43°24′57″N 88°05′44″W
- Country: United States
- State: Wisconsin
- County: Washington
- Time zone: Central (CST)
  - Summer (DST): CDT
- Area code: 262

Myra is an unincorporated community located within the town of Trenton in Washington County, Wisconsin, United States.

== History ==
The hamlet of Myra was platted by Chauncy Gray and Jacob E. Young. The name for the hamlet, Myra, was originally named by Young's wife who found the name Myra in her Bible. Myra was predominantly a Bohemian settlement. It was a busy and industrious little village in its early days.

The pond located near the hamlet was a fine fishing and recreational area. The fish were so prolific that sometimes the waterwheel was blocked by the huge pickerel weighing as much as twelve pounds. All went well until 1913 when, during a severe rainstorm, the dam broke and the pond drained into the Milwaukee River. The dam was never rebuilt.

The Trenton House, Myra's second tavern in the hamlet, was built in 1881 by Max Weinand. The Trenton House served as a hotel for the kiln and mill workers in the area. It was later sold to Paul Hetebrueg, who added a dance hall. Public dances were held at the dancing hall. The Trenton House dance hall also rented to the Myra Literary Society, who presented plays every spring.
