= Lizard Mound State Park =

- Washington County "Island" Effigy Mound District
- U.S. National Register of Historic Places
- U.S. Historic district
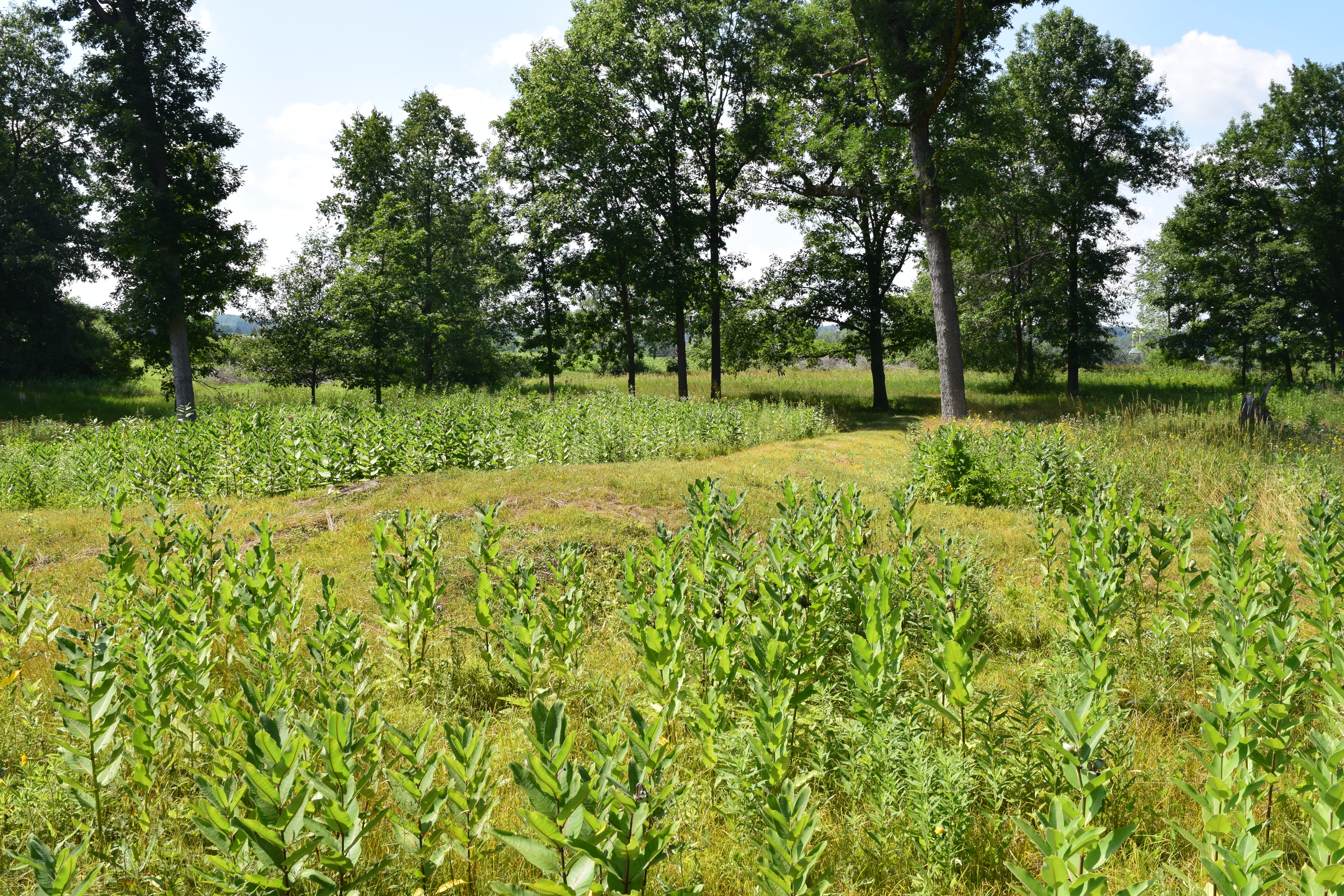
- A mound in the park

- Location within Wisconsin Location within the United States
- Nearest city: Farmington, Washington County, Wisconsin
- Coordinates: 43°27′48″N 88°08′21″W
- Area: 22 acres (8.9 ha)
- NRHP reference No.: 96000417
- Added to NRHP: April 25, 1996

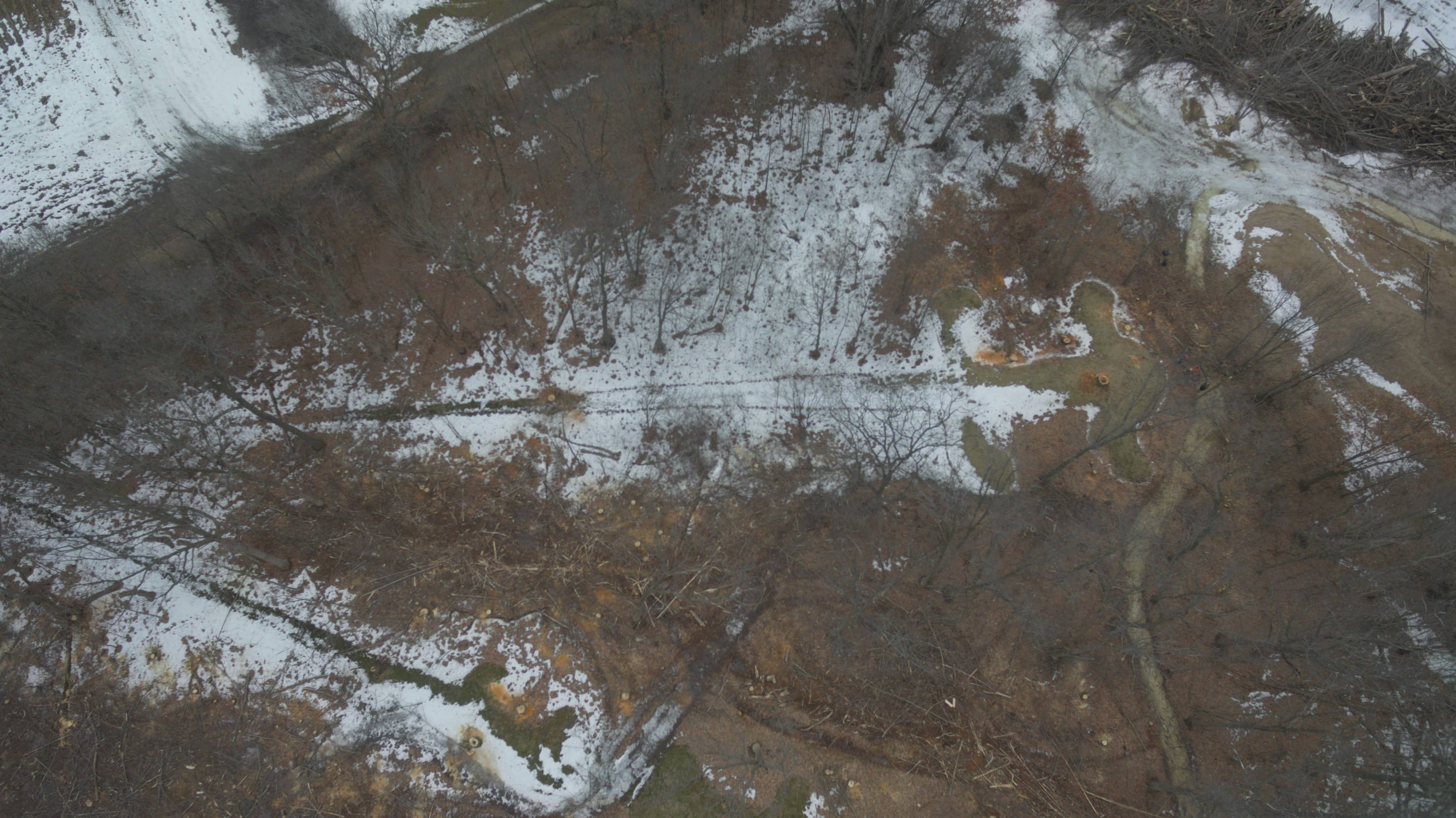
The Lizard Mound (center), from which this park gets its name.

Lizard Mound State Park is a state park in the Town of Farmington, Washington County, Wisconsin near the city of West Bend. The park contains a significant well-preserved effigy mound group, representing one of the largest and best-preserved collections of such mounds in the state. Mounds in the park are the subject of at least two different listings on the National Register of Historic Places, one encompassing the park as a whole, and another which includes a larger set of regional mounds. Established in 1950, the park was acquired by Washington County from the state of Wisconsin in 1986, and was returned to the state in 2021. It is now managed by the Wisconsin Department of Natural Resources.

== Information ==
Lizard Mound State Park is located in the Town of Farmington, north of West Bend, Wisconsin on County Trunk "A", one mile east of State Highway 144. Established in 1950, the park was acquired by Washington County from the State of Wisconsin in 1986. The park contains 28 effigy mounds in an excellent state of preservation, reputedly one of the best effigy mound groups remaining in Wisconsin. A self-guided anthropological nature trail winds around the park. Trail markers reveal information about the extinct culture that built the mounds. An unusually beautiful group of mounds, each is of prominent height and careful construction. Most of the mounds rise more than three feet above the ground surface. The variety of mound shapes found in the park is considered unusual. Two are large bird effigy mounds and seven are long-tailed animal forms. These long-tailed effigies are usually referred to as "panther" effigies. One of the 28 mounds is named "Lizard Mound". This mound might have been intended to represent the same animal, whether a panther or something else, but in a spread eagle posture that shows all four limbs.

== History ==
The Mound Builders lived in Wisconsin and bordering states between A.D. 500 and A.D. 1000. They survived by hunting, fishing, and gathering wild plants. They moved from place to place often. In the summer they could be found closer to rivers and lakes, while in the winter they moved into sheltered upland valleys. They built burial and effigy mounds shaped like mammals, reptiles, birds and other creatures, both real and mythical. They also constructed conical, oval and linear mounds. The effigy mound builders usually buried their dead in small pits or laid them on carefully prepared surfaces. The mounds were then built over them like grave markers. The custom of building effigy burial mounds died out about 1000 years ago; it was a custom unique to the general area. Little else is known about the Mound Builders. Even Indians who lived in Wisconsin when the first white men arrived didn't know why, or by whom, the mounds had been built. According to a sign located inside the park, the mounds were possibly constructed between A.D. 650 and A.D. 1300.

The earliest data concerning the mounds in the area of Lizard Mound State Park was in the form of a sketch map resulting from field investigations made by Professor Julius L. Torney of Milwaukee in 1883. In his sketch of the mound group, Torney illustrated a total of 47 Indian mounds. He also indicated that a number of the earthworks had been destroyed prior to the time that he drew his map. The original group probably consisted of at least 60 mounds, including many of the well known effigy shapes.

Archeological explorations conducted in 1960 revealed that the dead were placed in pits, with the effigy mounds built over the pits. Artifacts such as clay pots, projectile points, pipes, bone harpoons and beads were sometimes placed with the dead. It has been speculated that the shapes of the mounds had a religious or clan significance, but no one knows for sure.

Excavations of Effigy Mound Builders' village sites indicated they lived in small nomadic groups, hunted, fished, gathered fruits and nuts, fashioned tools of stone, wood, bone and copper, made pottery and may have been the first people in Wisconsin to use the bow and arrow.

== See also ==
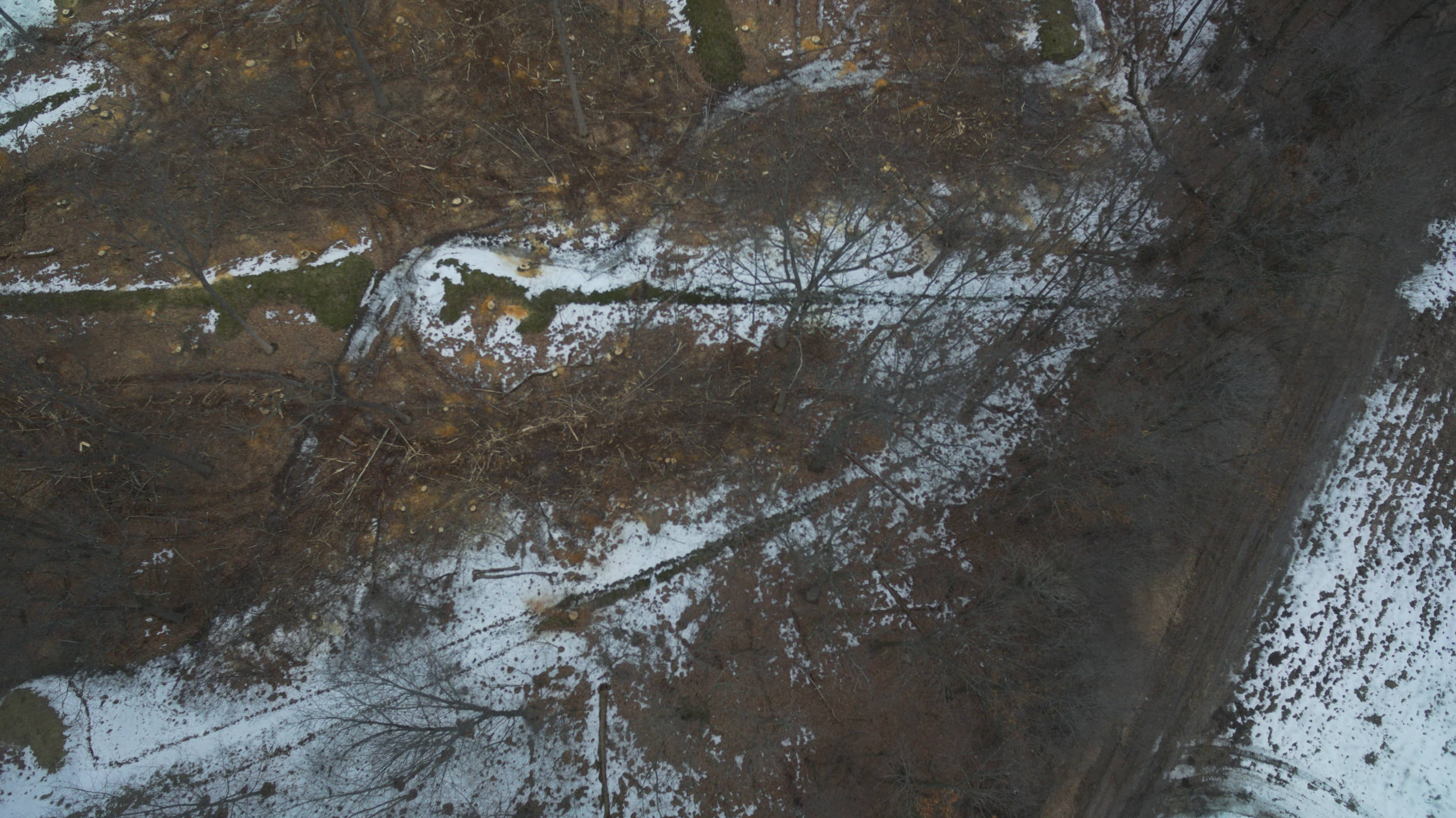
- Two Mishibijiw mounds (top); an Ojibwe word for underwater panther.
  List of burial mounds in the United States
