= Fillmore, Wisconsin =

- Unincorporated community
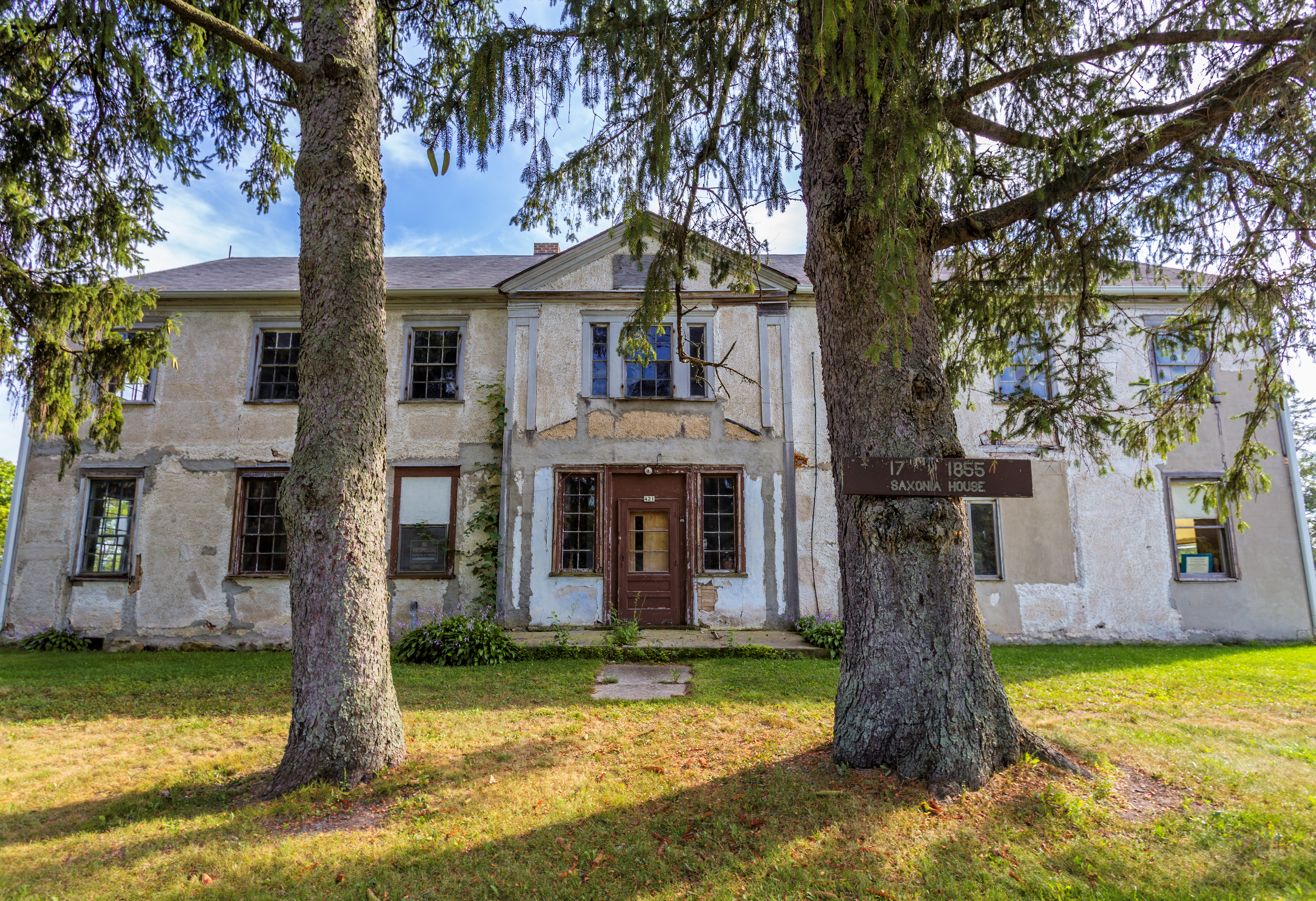
- The Saxonia House, built in 1855 in Fillmore

- Location within Wisconsin Location within the United States
- Coordinates: 43°29′54″N 88°03′38″W
- Country: United States
- State: Wisconsin
- County: Washington
- Elevation: 843 ft (257 m)
- Time zone: UTC-6 (Central (CST))
  - Summer (DST): UTC-5 (CDT)
- Area code: 262
- GNIS feature ID: 1564938

Fillmore (also Filmore) is an unincorporated community in the Town of Farmington, Washington County, Wisconsin, United States. The community was settled in the early 1850s by a group of immigrants from Saxony.

== Description ==
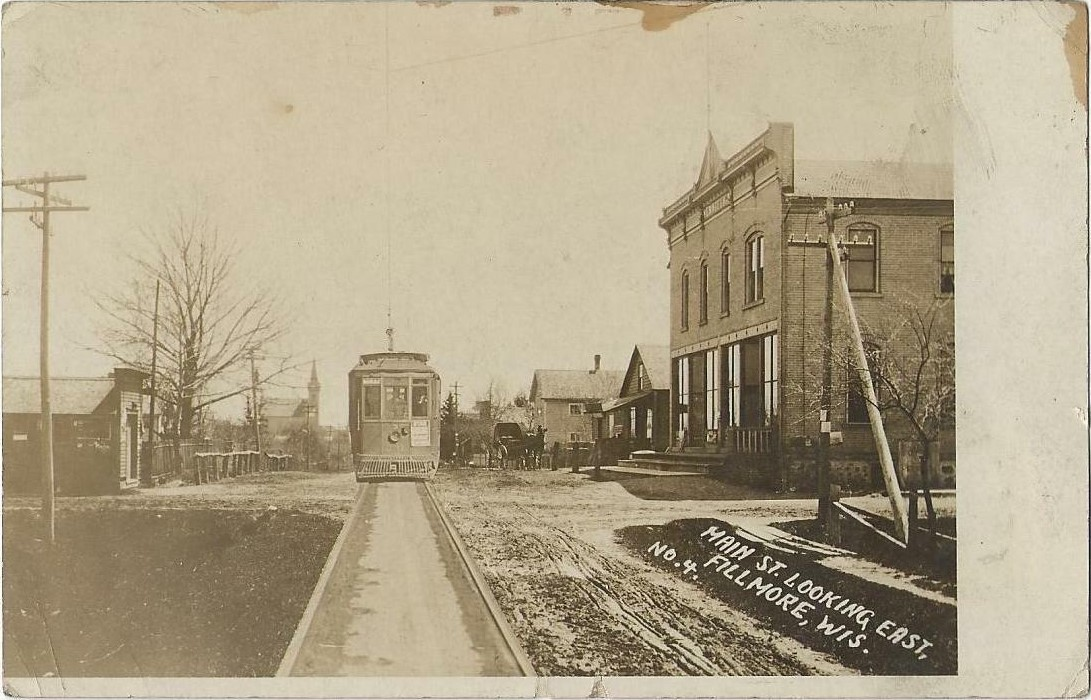
A trolley is seen on a postcard of Fillmore's Main Street that was sent on November 2, 1911

The settlement was named after Millard Fillmore, who was president at the time.

Fillmore is the location of the 1855 Saxonia House brewery, which was a gathering place for locals. The building was listed on the National Register of Historic Places in 2006.

In 1862, some of the Saxon immigrants organized the Farmington Turnverein, a German cultural association, and in 1868, they built the Fillmore Turner Hall, which still exists as an event space and banquet hall as of 2020.
