= Cadwallader Humphrey =

American politician in Wisconsin

Cadwell Wiggins "Cadwallader" Humphrey (February 2, 1822 – May 24, 1902) was an American member of the Wisconsin State Assembly during the 1861 session.
