= St. John of God Roman Catholic Church, Convent, and School =

Historic church in Wisconsin, United States

- U.S. National Register of Historic Places
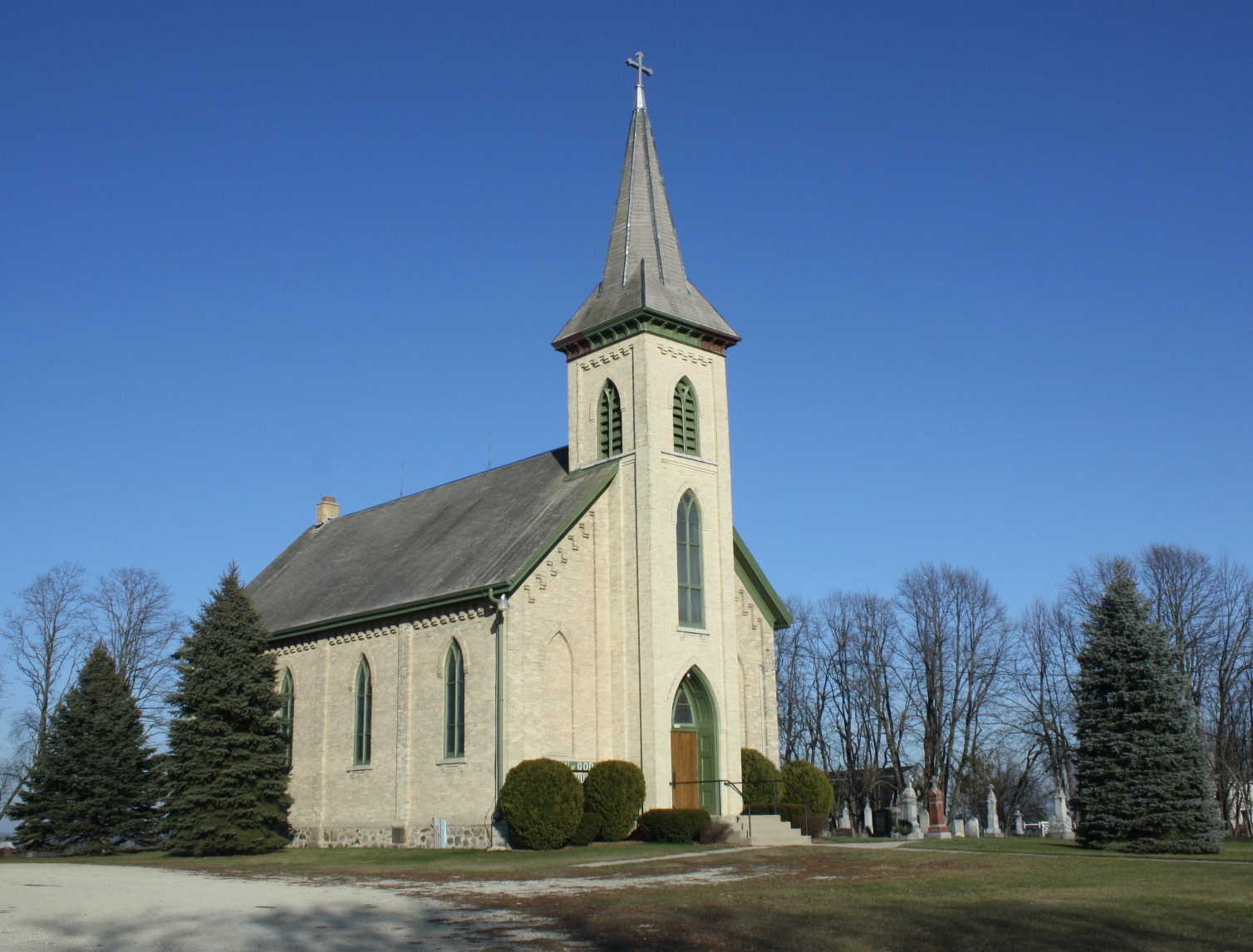

- Location within Wisconsin Location within the United States
- Nearest city: Kewaskum, Wisconsin
- Coordinates: 43°30′48″N 88°6′35″W
- Area: 1.4 acres (0.57 ha)
- Built: 1891
- Architectural style: Gothic Revival
- NRHP reference No.: 79000117
- Added to NRHP: August 9, 1979

St. John of God Roman Catholic Church, Convent, and School is a historic church near the unincorporated community of Boltonville in the Town of Farmington, Wisconsin. The church was built from Cream City brick in 1891, although the congregation has existed since the 1850s.

The Town of Farmington was historically a German community, but the St. John of God congregation was organized by Irish immigrants who settled in the Boltonville area and elected not to join one of the town's German-speaking Catholic churches. In 1860, they constructed a church building which no longer exists and was replaced by the 1891 structure.

In 1868, the Sisters of St. Agnes, a Catholic order founded in the Village of Barton, Wisconsin, built a school and a convent on the church property. The nuns served as public school teachers until at least 1892, and also taught parochial classes in the convent until 1879. Both buildings were abandoned around the turn of the century and were stripped for materials in the 1930s. Only the buildings' fieldstone-and-mortar walls remain.

The site was added to the National Register of Historic Places in 1979.
