= Wisconsin Highway 28 =

Highway in Wisconsin

State Trunk Highway 28
- WIS 28 highlighted in red

Route information
- Maintained by WisDOT
- Length: 59.77 mi (96.19 km)

Major junctions
- West end: WIS 33 in Horicon
- I-41 / US 41 in Theresa; US 45 in Kewaskum; WIS 32 in Sheboygan Falls; I-43 / LMCT in Sheboygan
- East end: WIS 23 / WIS 42 / LMCT in Sheboygan

Location
- Country: United States
- State: Wisconsin
- Counties: Dodge, Washington, Sheboygan

Highway system
- Wisconsin State Trunk Highway System; Interstate; US; State; Scenic; Rustic
← WIS 27	→ WIS 29

State Trunk Highway 28 (often called Highway 28, STH-28 or WIS 28) is a 59.77-mile (96.19 km) state highway in Dodge, Washington, and Sheboygan counties in southeastern portion of the US state of Wisconsin that runs east–west between Horicon and Sheboygan. The route is generally two-lane road beyond portions of the road within the city of Sheboygan and the half-mile portion of the highway near Waldo which runs concurrently with Wisconsin Highway 57.

== Route description ==
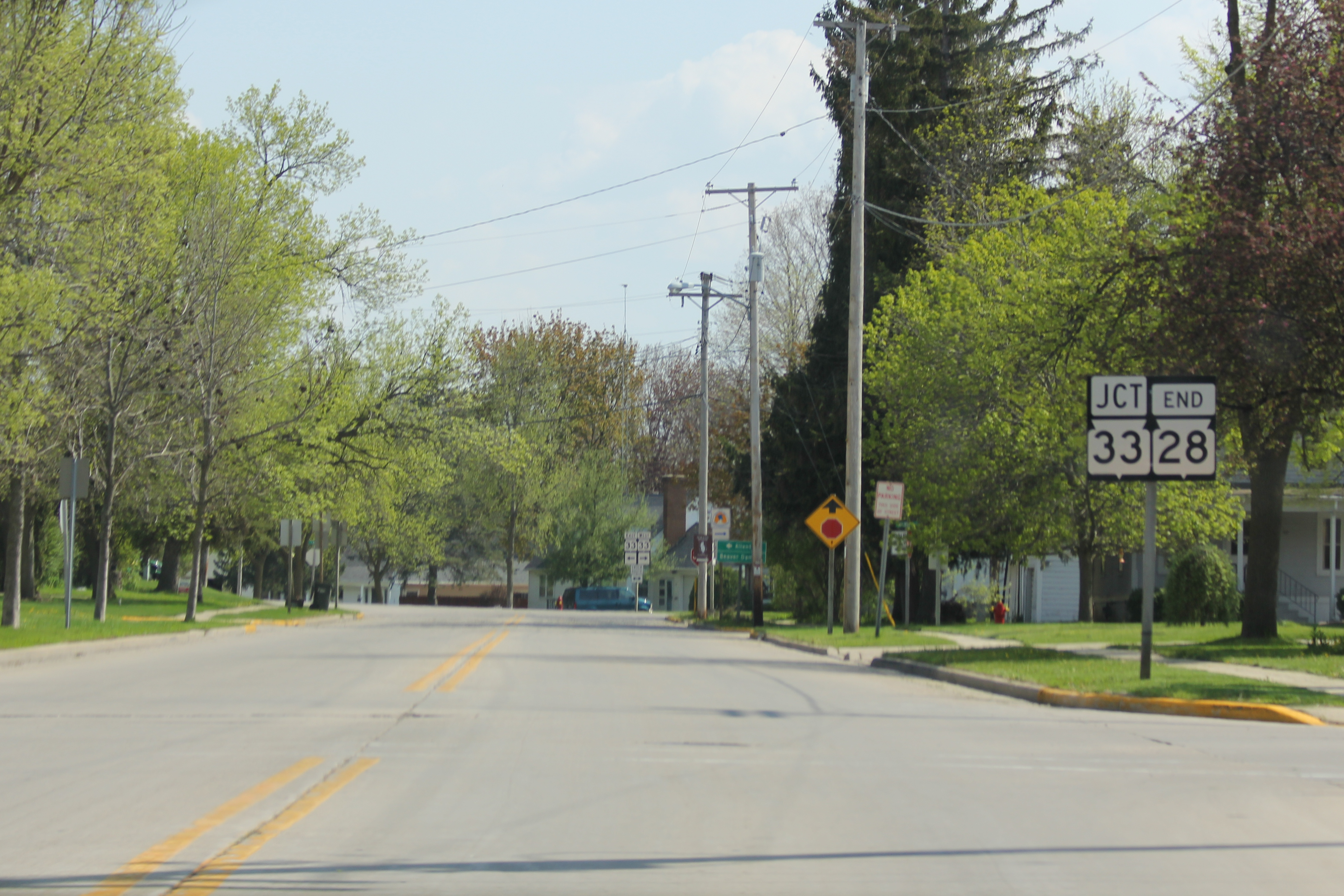
Southwest terminus in Horicon

WIS 28 begins at a junction with WIS 33 in Horicon. The highway junctions with WIS 67 northeast of Horicon in Mayvillle and follows WIS 67 north into Theresa. The two highways turn north onto WIS 175 there. WIS 28 turns east off the concurrency one mile (1.6 km) further north and junctions with Interstate 41 (I-41) after another two miles (3.2 km) east. The Washington County line is at this junction. WIS 28 crosses US 45 in Kewaskum and turns northeast onto WIS 144 north in Boltonville.

WIS 144 turns east off WIS 28 one mile (1.6 km) north of the Sheboygan County line and WIS 28 continues north, passing through Batavia before turning northeast at its junction with County Trunk Highway S (CTH-S). The highway passes through Cascade and joins for a half-mile north with WIS 57 in Waldo. WIS 28 turns east, then leaves its former alignment for a straight-line road south of Sheboygan Falls which was built in the mid-1980s. The road then runs through the southernmost reaches of the Kohler Company's landholdings, and defines the southern boundary of the Blackwolf Run golf course, along with the Deer Trace shopping center before its intersection with I-43. Reaching Sheboygan city limits, the road is defined as Washington Avenue, running one mile (1.6 km) into the city before a northward turn onto South Business Drive, the former US 141, which eventually merges within the city's original plat with 14th Street. The highway's eastern terminus shares the intersection of Erie Avenue and North 14th Street with WIS 23's eastern terminus and WIS 42's southern terminus just north of the Sheboygan River.

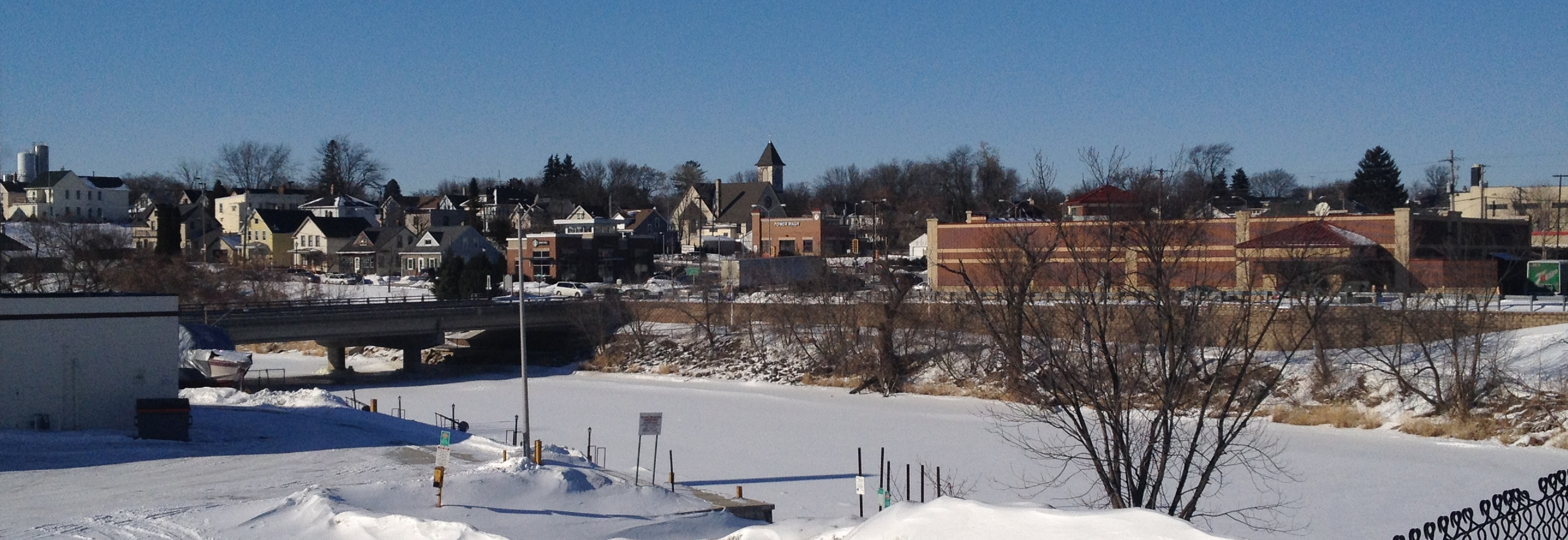
The three-highway terminus in Sheboygan; WIS 28 goes over the North 14th Street Bridge before ending at the intersection a half-block north.

== History ==
In 1918, the original routing of WIS 28 was between Dubuque and Spring Green along the present day US 151 and the WIS 23 alignments (prior to the construction of the expressway between Dubuque and Dodgeville). The highway was extended a couple years later to end in Reedsburg, and then expanded to Sheboygan along the former routing of WIS 26 in 1924. Formerly through eastern Sheboygan County, the road's alignment took it through Sheboygan Falls, Kohler, and Sheboygan via what is known as the Lower Falls Road and within Sheboygan, Indiana Avenue.

On October 10, 2019, Governor Tony Evers signed a law establishing the section of WIS 28 between US 41 in Dodge County and WIS 144 in Washington County as the "Wisconsin 9/11 Memorial Highway."

== Major intersections ==
County	Location	mi	km	Destinations	Notes
Dodge	Horicon			WIS 33 – Beaver Dam, Allenton	
Dodge	Mayville			WIS 67 south – Oconomowoc	WIS 28 East follow WIS 67 North
Dodge	Theresa			WIS 175 south – Slinger	WIS 175 North follow WIS 67 North / WIS 28 East
Dodge	Theresa			WIS 67 north / WIS 175 north – Lomira	WIS 28 West / WIS 175 South follow WIS 67 South
Dodge	Theresa			I-41 / US 41 – Fond du Lac, Green Bay, Milwaukee	
Washington	Kewaskum			US 45 – Eden, Fond du Lac, West Bend	Overlaps US 45 for less than 0.5 miles through Kewaskum
Washington	Boltonville			WIS 144 south – West Bend	WIS 144 North follow WIS 28 East
Sheboygan				WIS 144 north – Random Lake	WIS 144 South follow WIS 28 West
Sheboygan				CTH-S	
Sheboygan	Cascade			CTH-NN	
Sheboygan	Waldo			WIS 57 – Plymouth, Milwaukee	Overlaps WIS 57 for less than 0.25 miles through Waldo
Sheboygan	Sheboygan Falls			WIS 32 – Sheboygan Falls, Cedar Grove	
Sheboygan	Sheboygan			I-43 / LMCT – Green Bay, Milwaukee	
Sheboygan	Sheboygan			CTH-OK	Former US 141
Sheboygan	Sheboygan			WIS 23 west / WIS 42 north / LMCT (Erie Avenue)	
1.000 mi = 1.609 km; 1.000 km = 0.621 mi
