= St. Augustine Catholic Church and Cemetery (Trenton, Wisconsin) =

Historic site in Washington County, Wisconsin, US

- U.S. National Register of Historic Places
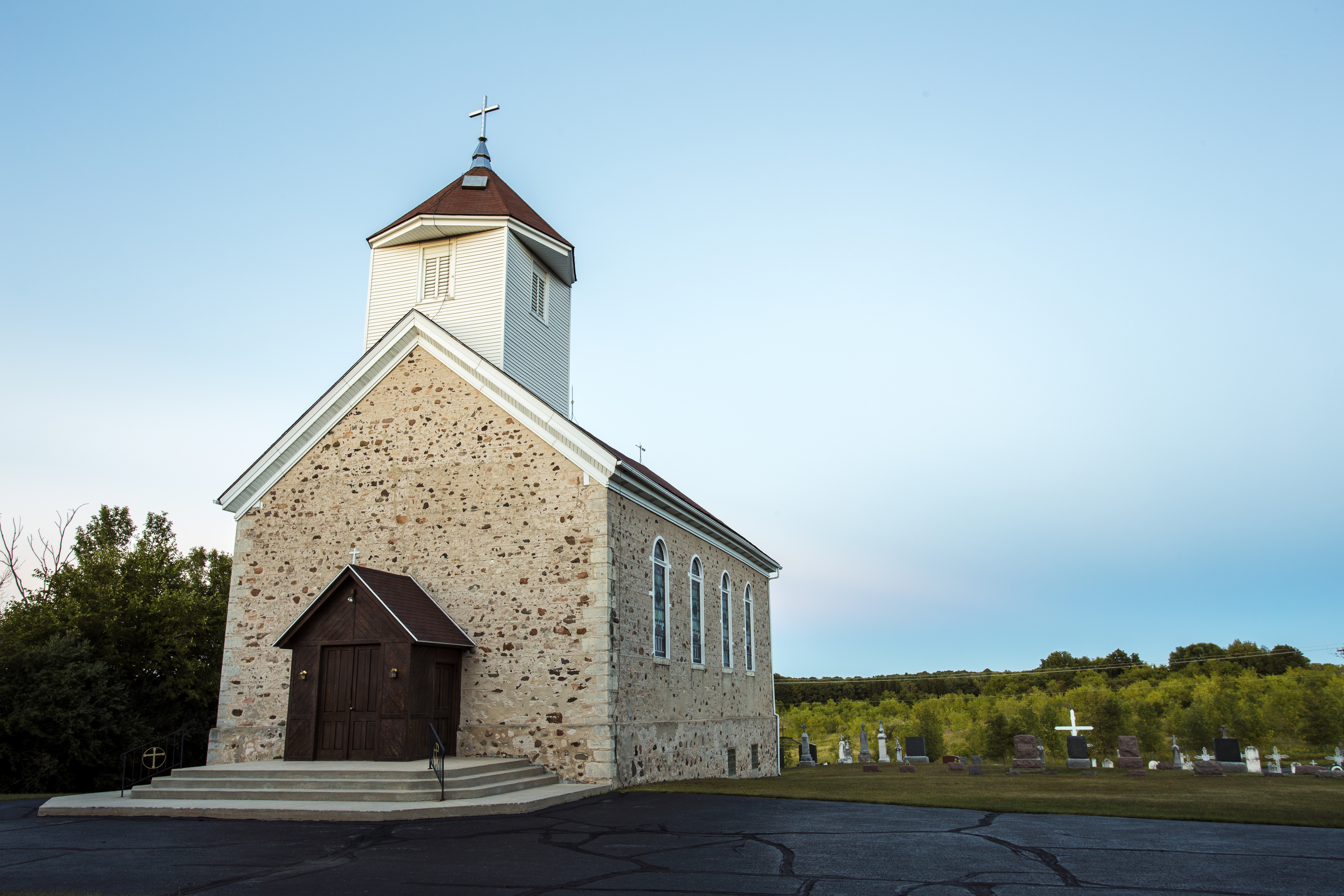

- Location within Wisconsin Location within the United States
- Location: Co. Hwy. Y 3 mi. S of jct. of Co. Hwy. Y and SR 33, Trenton, Wisconsin
- Coordinates: 43°23′3″N 88°2′28″W
- Area: 3.8 acres (1.5 ha)
- Built: 1856
- Architectural style: Romanesque
- NRHP reference No.: 90000638
- Added to NRHP: May 3, 1990

St. Augustine Catholic Church and Cemetery is a historic church site at Co. Hwy. Y 3 miles south of the junction of Co. Hwy. Y and SR 33 in the Town of Trenton, Wisconsin, United States. It was built in 1856 by a community of Catholic immigrants from the Kingdom of Bavaria. Like many early structures in southeastern Wisconsin, it is made of mortared fieldstone, and is one of four surviving fieldstone churches in Washington County, Wisconsin.

The church was served by itinerant missionary priests for the first twenty-four years of its existence. After 1870, the congregation was served by the same priest as the neighboring Holy Trinity Church in Newburg. In the 19th century, the church basement hosted a school where children from the area learned to read and write in German while also receiving religious education. The students were taught by Sisters of St. Agnes, whose order was founded in the Village of Barton, Wisconsin.

Originally, the inside of the church had whitewashed walls, but in 1925, the congregation commissioned Milwaukee artist Hans Schmeidl to paint a depiction of St. Augustine behind the altar, flanked by bordered medallion paintings of Mary and Jesus.

Sermons and hymns were in German into the 1940s.

The church stopped holding regular services in 1985, and the parishioners joined Holy Trinity Church in Newburg. From that point on, the building was used exclusively for holiday services, weddings, and funerals. It was added to the National Register of Historic Places in 1990.
