= St. Peter's Church (West Bend, Wisconsin) =

Historic church in Wisconsin, United States

- U.S. National Register of Historic Places
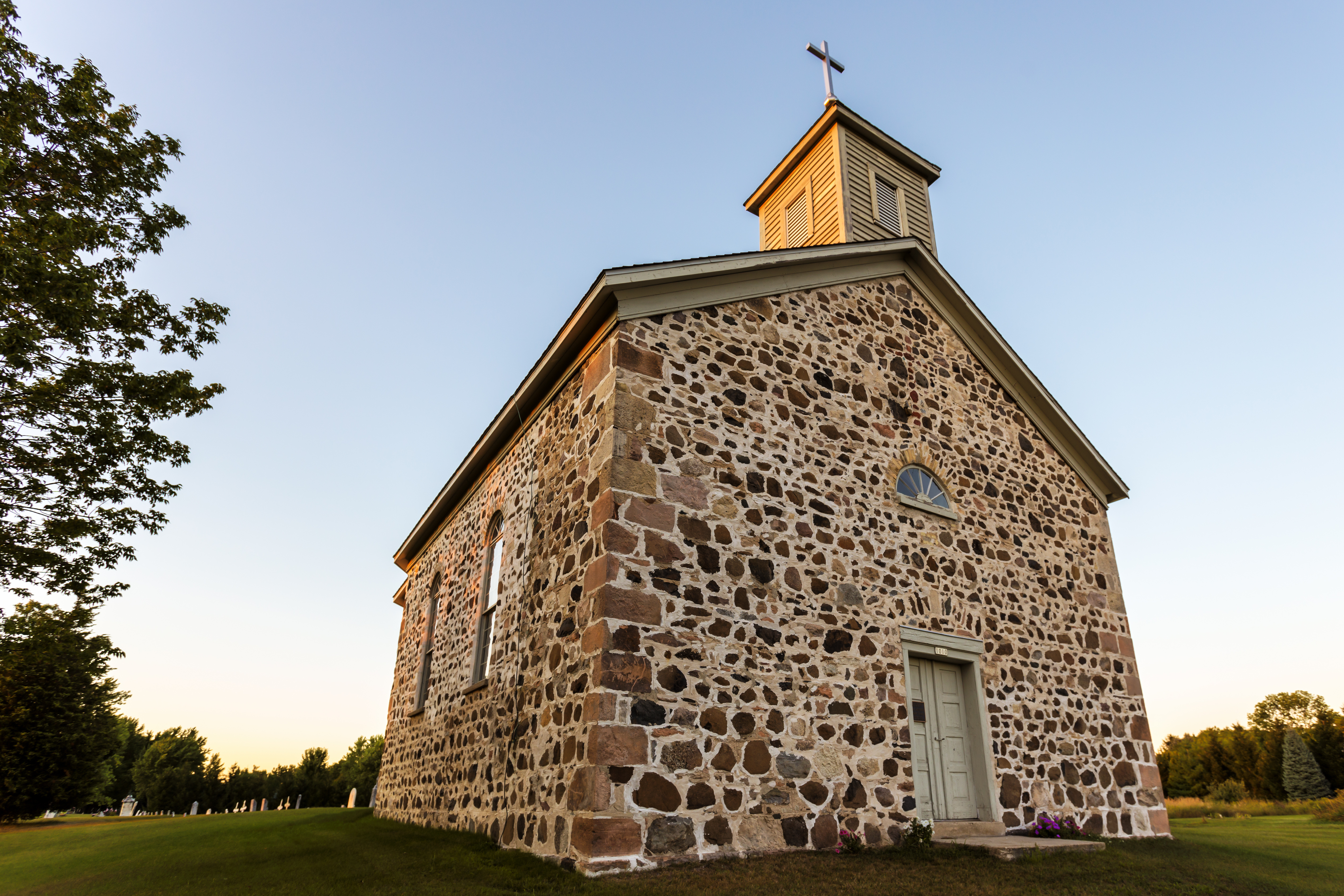
- Nearest city: West Bend, Wisconsin
- Coordinates: 43°27′17″N 88°5′11″W
- Area: 2.4 acres (0.97 ha)
- Built: 1861
- NRHP reference No.: 83003430
- Added to NRHP: June 30, 1983

St. Peter's Church is a Catholic Church located at 1010 Newark Drive, Town of Farmington, Wisconsin. It was built in 1861 by a congregation of German immigrant farmers. Like many early structures in southeastern Wisconsin, it is made of mortared fieldstone, and is one of four surviving fieldstone churches in Washington County, Wisconsin. Church services were in German until 1930.

In 1874, the congregation built a schoolhouse nearby, which operated into the 1920s. There is also a cemetery behind the church.

On June 30, 1983, it was added to the National Register of Historic Places for its architectural significance. Regular church services were discontinued in the 20th century, and as of the building's addition to the register, it was only used on Easter and Christmas.
