= Boltonville, Wisconsin =

- Unincorporated community
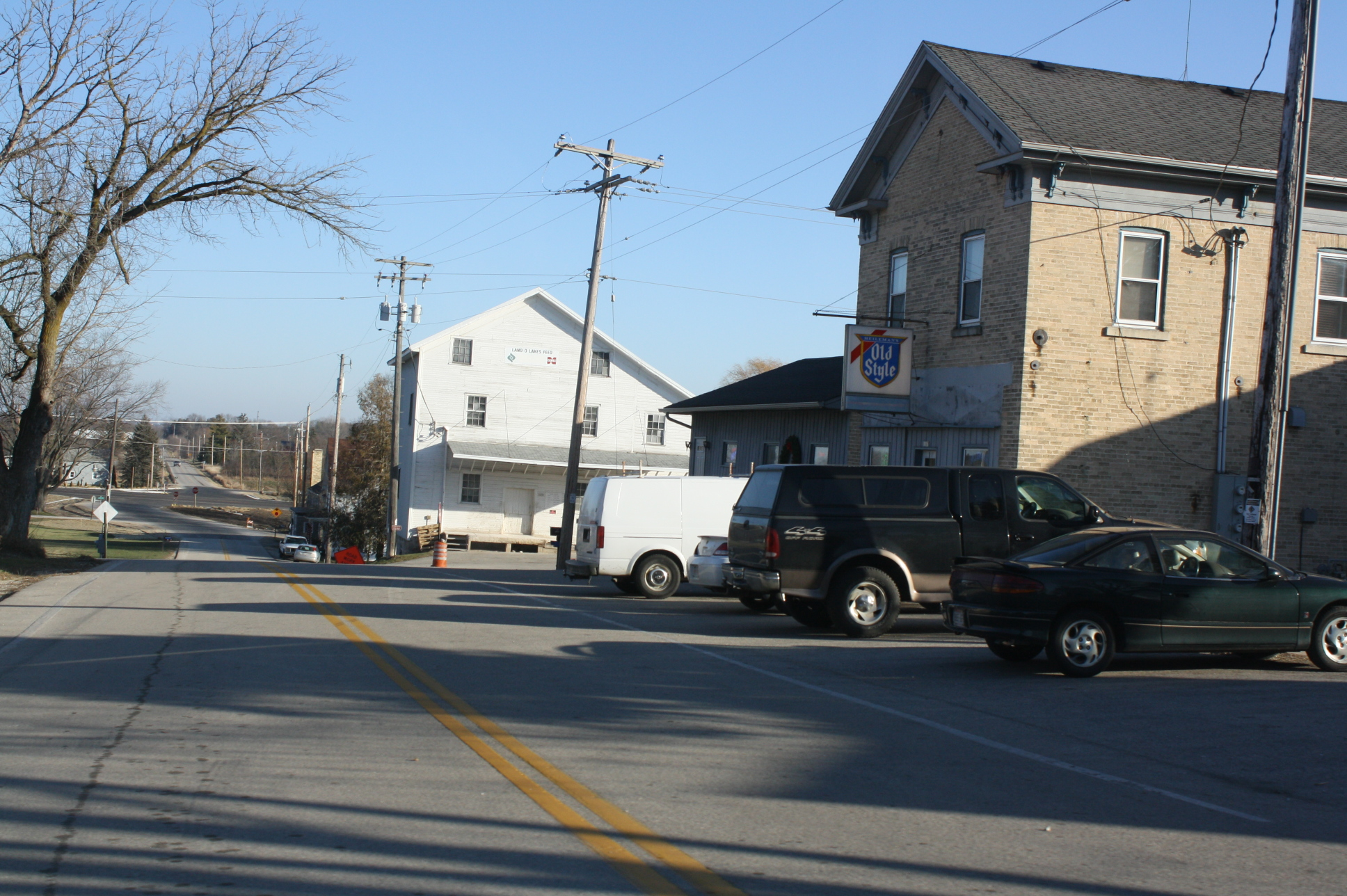
- Looking east at downtown Boltonville

- Location within Wisconsin Location within the United States
- Coordinates: 43°31′38″N 88°06′02″W
- Country: United States
- State: Wisconsin
- County: Washington
- Elevation: 873 ft (266 m)
- Time zone: UTC-6 (Central (CST))
  - Summer (DST): UTC-5 (CDT)
- Area code: 262
- GNIS feature ID: 1562045

Boltonville is an unincorporated community located on Stony Creek in the town of Farmington, Washington County, Wisconsin, United States.

== History ==
Harlow Bolton established the community in 1854. While much of Farmington was settled by German immigrants, Boltonville was a center of Irish immigration. The early settlers used Stony Creek to power grist and saw mills. There was also a cheese factory, as well as shops, a post office, and a school.

In 1860, a group of Irish Catholics built a church in the community. The building was replaced by the St. John of God Church in 1891.

In 1868, the Sisters of St. Agnes, a Catholic order founded in the Village of Barton, Wisconsin, built a school and a convent on the St. John of God Church property. The nuns served as public school teachers until at least 1892, and also taught parochial classes in the convent until 1879. Both buildings were abandoned around the turn of the century and were stripped for materials in the 1930s.

In 1872, a group of Free Will Baptists from New England established a church in Boltonville. They had previously lived in the neighboring Town of Trenton. The building became St. John's Evangelical Congregation in 1905 and is currently home to St. John's United Church of Christ.

== Images ==
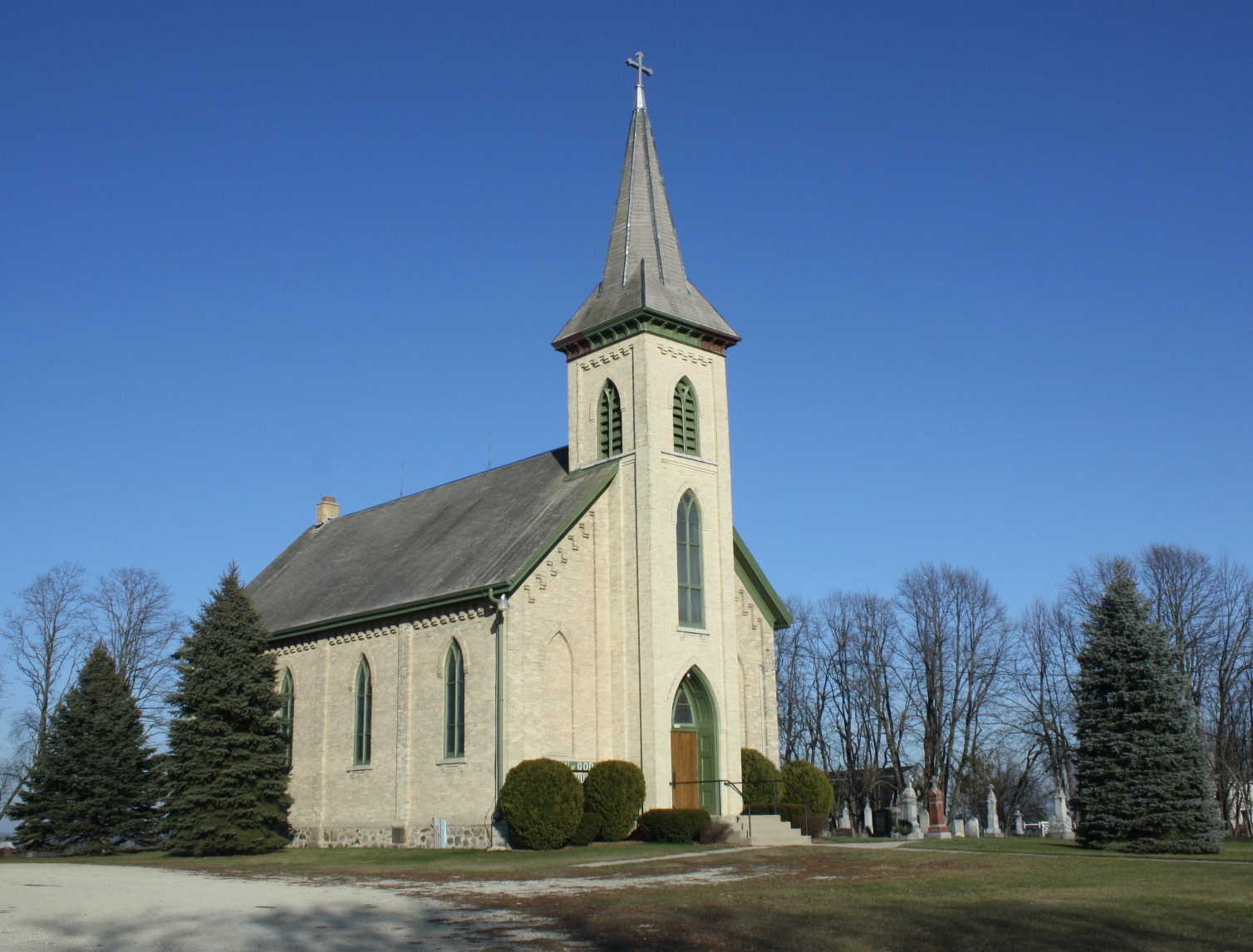
St. John of God Roman Catholic Church, Convent, and School

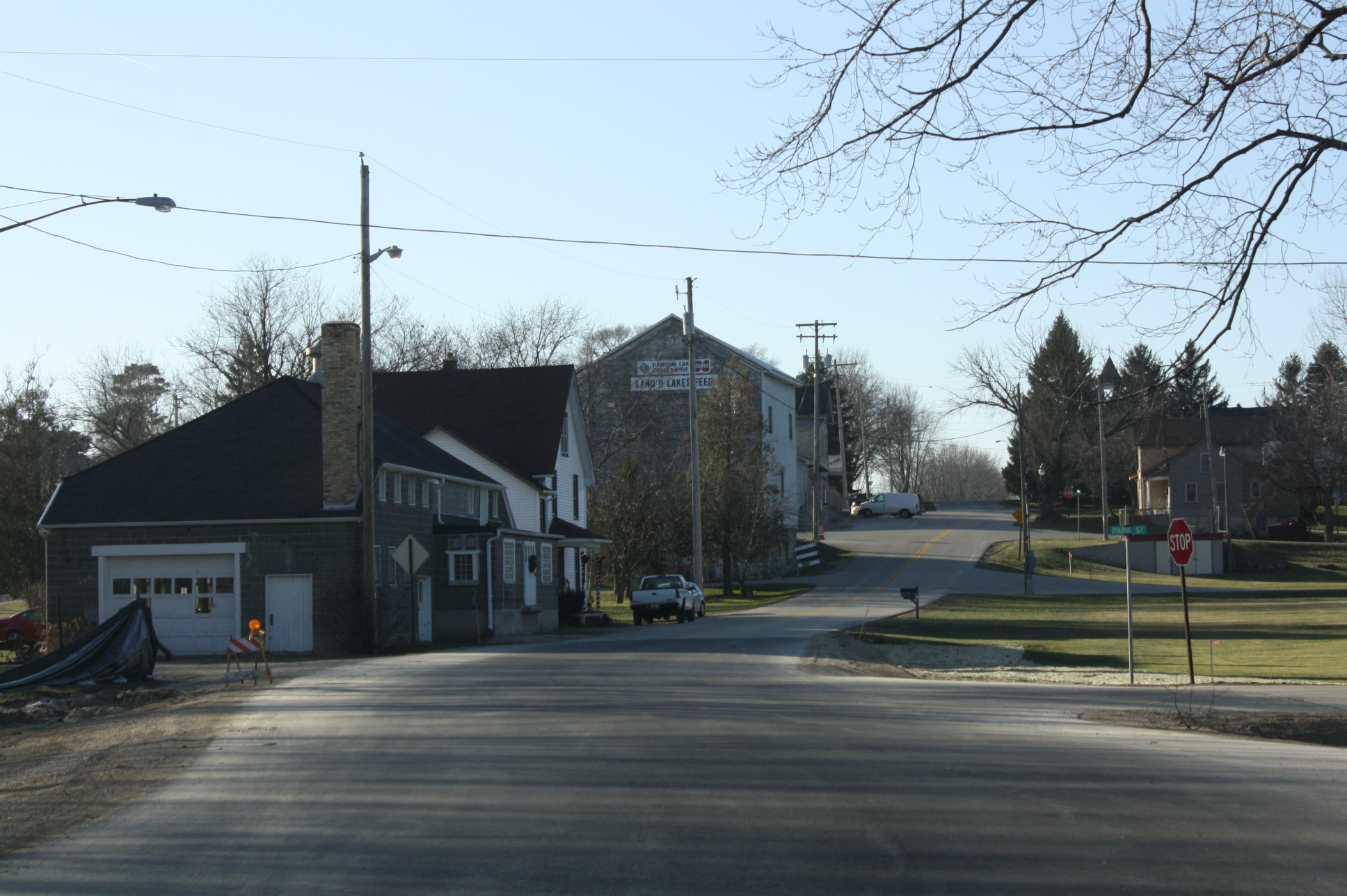
Looking west in downtown Boltonville

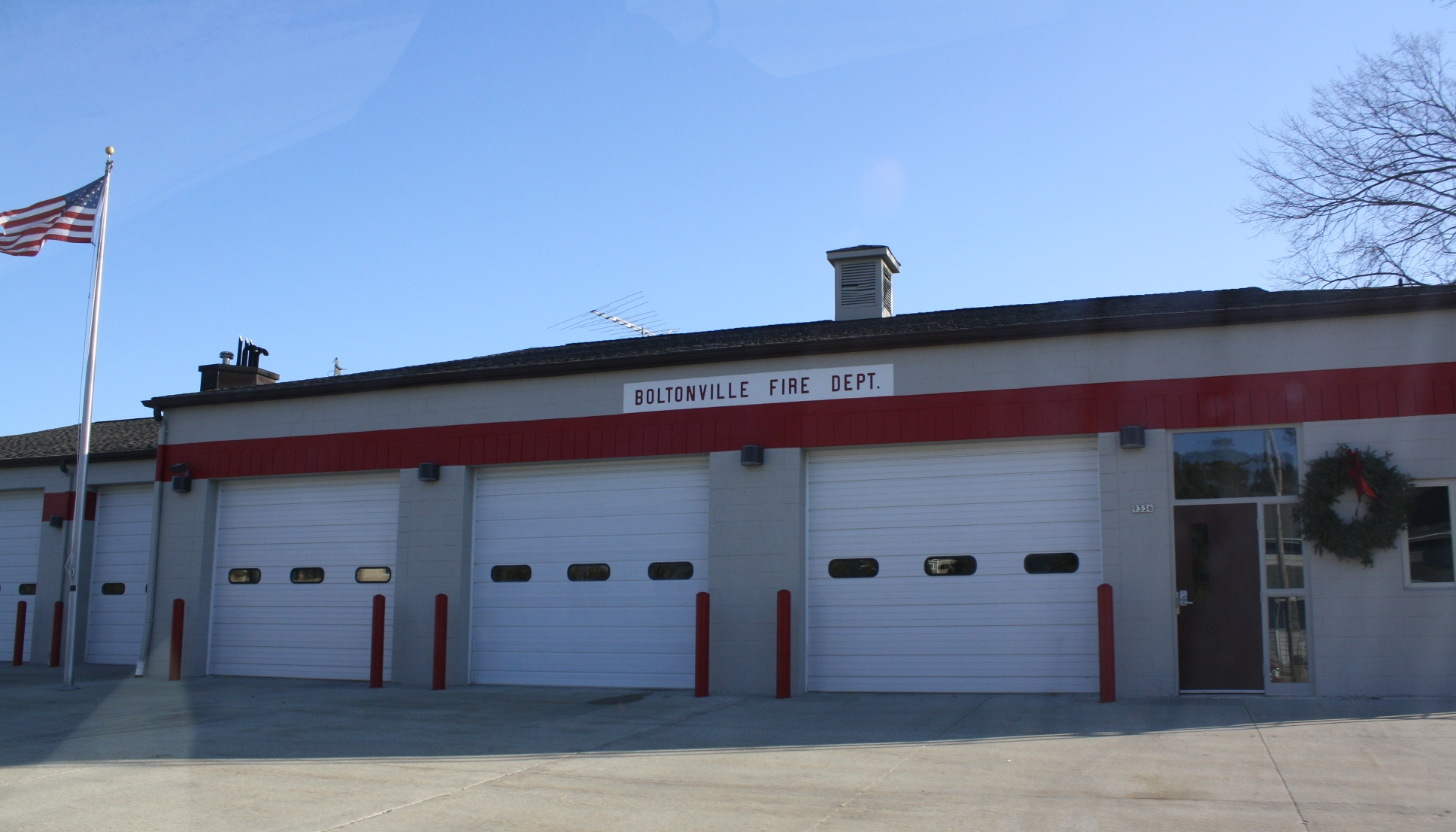
Fire department

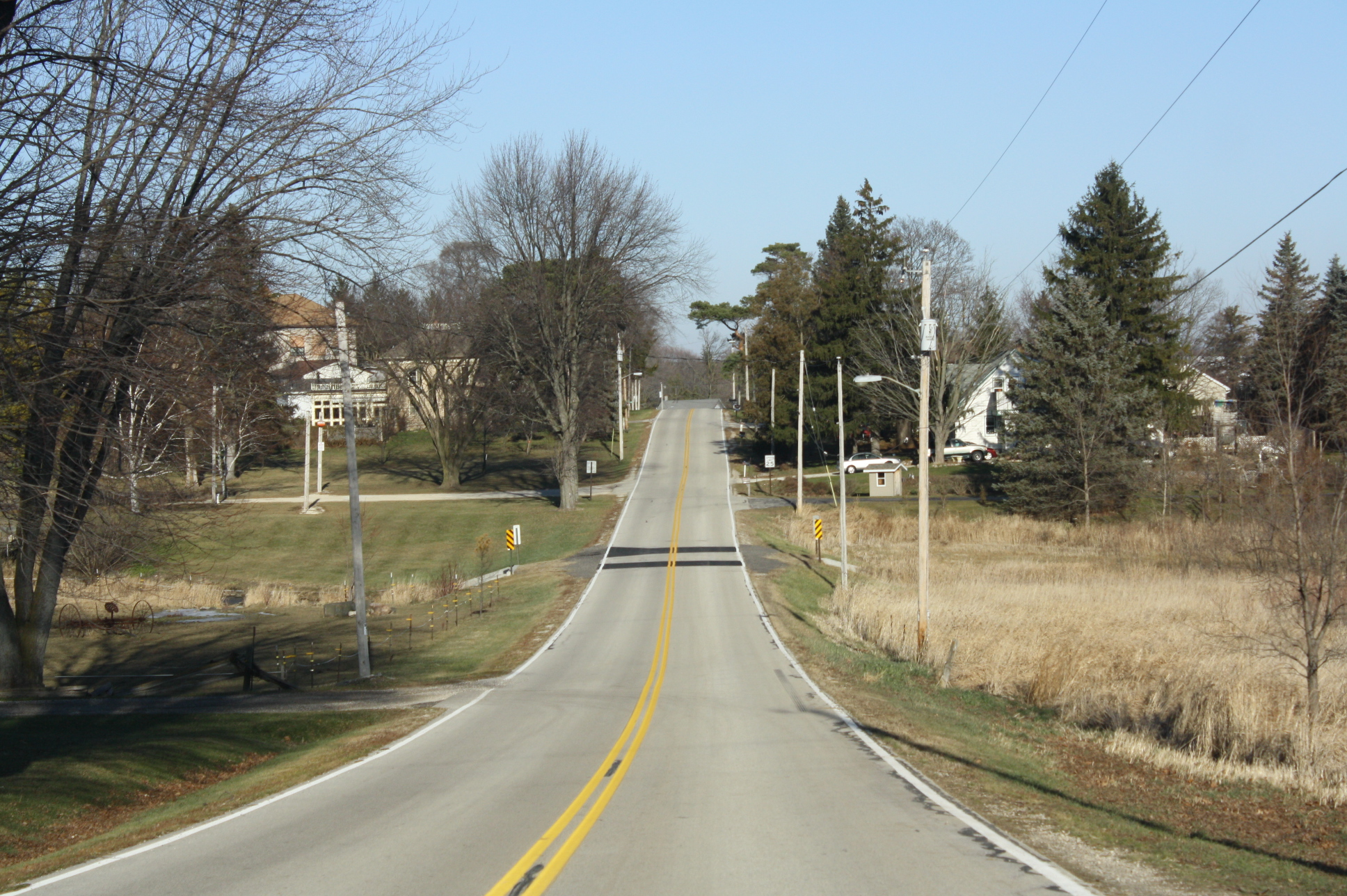
Looking north at Boltonville

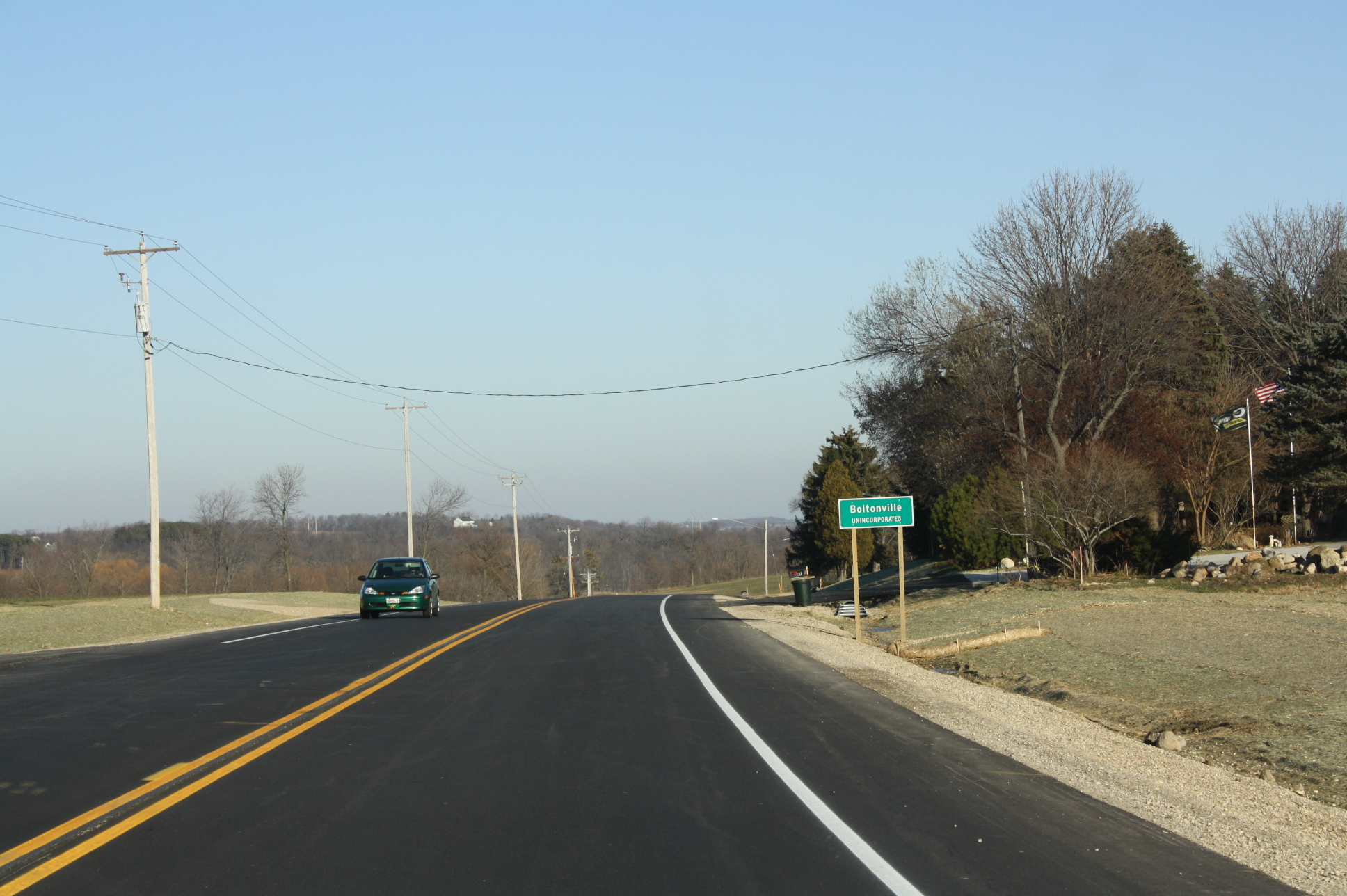
Looking north at the sign for Boltonville on WIS 28
