= Southeast Wisconsin Transit System =

Partnership between public transit systems

Southeast Wisconsin Transit System was a marketing partnership of five public transit agencies covering the Greater Milwaukee Area in the United States. These operators provided local or intercounty commuter service in the counties of Milwaukee, Racine, Kenosha, and Waukesha. Washington County and Ozaukee County were formerly a part of the partnership until 2023 and 2024 when their county boards respectively elected to discontinue their transit service without replacement. The partnership was not exclusive, each agency or company maintained separate marketing departments and advertising programs. The partnership did not include joint or coordinated operations, interline fares or transfers, coordinated grant or funding, or coordinated expense sharing as that type of cooperation would be barred by state law.

A Wisconsin state law passed in 2011 authored by Stephen Nass and signed by then governor Scott Walker prohibits regional transportation authorities effectively barring agencies from creating formal alliances and funding agreements. Repercussions from that 2011 law and the COVID-19 pandemic have resulted in significant reductions of service particularly in the WOW Counties of suburban Milwaukee.

As of Summer 2025, the Southwest Wisconsin Transit System as a formal entity ceases to exist, it is not clear when the organization disbanded.

== Former members ==
- Milwaukee County Transit System (Milwaukee, Ozaukee, Washington, and Waukesha counties)
- Waukesha Metro Transit (Waukesha local and Milwaukee commuter service)
- Ryde Racine (Racine; commuter service to Milwaukee and Kenosha counties)
- Kenosha Transit (Kenosha)
- Western Kenosha County Transit (Kenosha, operated by Kenosha County)
- Ozaukee County Commuter Express (Defunct as of June 28th, 2024)
- Washington County Commuter Express (Richfield; commuter service between Milwaukee and Washington counties) (Defunct as of September 2023)
