= Ackerville =

Ackerville may refer to:

- Ackerville, Alabama
- Ackerville, Wisconsin
