= Washington County Commuter Express =

Former transit service in Washington County, Wisconsin

- Defunct: 2023
- Headquarters: Fond du Lac Ave., Richfield
- Locale: Washington County, WI
- Service type: express bus service
- Operator: Riteway Bus Service
- Website: https://www.washcowisco.gov/departments/highway_department/transit_services/commuter_express

Washington County Commuter Express was a contracted transportation service that provided service between Milwaukee and Washington counties. WCCE, which was a partner in the Southeast Wisconsin Transit System, was funded by Washington County and operated by Riteway Transportation in Richfield, Wisconsin.

WCCE previously offered two commuter routes operating Monday through Fridays (Downtown Milwaukee Express and Milwaukee Regional Medical Center Express) and a shared-ride taxi program for Washington County residents (with the exception of West Bend and Hartford).

On June 14th the Washington County board of supervisors voted to discontinue the WCCE service. The last day of service was September 29th 2023. This leaves Washington County with no public transit commuter option to Milwaukee.
