= Mayfield, Wisconsin =

- Unincorporated community
- Location within Wisconsin Location within the United States
- Coordinates: 43°19′45″N 88°11′48″W
- Country: United States
- State: Wisconsin
- County: Washington
- Elevation: 942 ft (287 m)
- Time zone: UTC-6 (Central (CST))
  - Summer (DST): UTC-5 (CDT)
- Postal code: 53037
- Area code: 262
- GNIS feature ID: 1569145

Mayfield is an unincorporated community in the Town of Polk in Washington County, Wisconsin, United States. It is west of Jackson and east of Slinger and lies to the northwest of the intersection of Wisconsin Highway 60 and U.S. Route 45.

== History ==
Mayfield was settled and platted in 1852 by Andreas Reiderer, an immigrant from Switzerland, who named it after the Swiss town of Maienfeld. Reiderer built a sawmill along the Cedar Creek. The area was also called for Katzbach for a short time, after Joseph Katz, who built a store in the community. Mayfield received a post office in 1859, but quickly declined after the railroad stopped instead at Jackson, less than a mile to the east.

=== Lady Antebellum concert ===
On October 21, 2010, Mayfield made news when country music group Lady Antebellum performed a free concert at a Mobil station in the community. The concert was an attempt to make amends for comments the group had made in an interview with Entertainment Weekly about a performance they had held in nearby Slinger before their rise to fame. Charles Kelley, a member of the group, stated that the comments were taken out of context and that the magazine neglected to print that they had said the performance in Slinger was "a lot of fun".

== Notable people ==
- George W. Koch, Wisconsin State Assemblyman, farmer, and businessman, was born in Mayfield.
