= Joseph E. Russell =

American politician

Member of the Wisconsin Assembly
- In office 1934–1934

Personal details
- Born: April 4, 1864 Erin, Wisconsin, U.S.
- Died: January 5, 1940 (aged 76) Erin, Wisconsin, U.S.
- Party: Democratic
- Education: Whitewater Normal School

Joseph E. Russell (April 4, 1864 – January 5, 1940) was an American farmer, teacher, and politician.

== Early life and education ==
Russell was born in Erin, Wisconsin. He graduated from Whitewater Normal School (now the University of Wisconsin–Whitewater) and then taught school in Washington County, Wisconsin.

== Career ==
Russell was a farmer and helped organized the cooperative cheese factory in Erin. Rusell was a livestock dealer and raised hogs and dairy cattle. He served as the Town of Erin clerk. Russell also served on the school board and was the board clerk. During World War I, Russell served on the Town of Erin Council of Defense. He served in the Wisconsin Assembly in 1933 and 1934 and was a Democrat.

== Personal life ==
Russell died at his home in Erin, Wisconsin.
