= Alice in Dairyland =

Wisconsin agricultural ambassador program

- Formation: 1948
- Type: Governmental organization, ambassador, agriculturalist
- Headquarters: Madison
- Location: Wisconsin
- Official language: English
- Website: Official website

Alice in Dairyland is a one-year, full-time public relations professional employed by the Wisconsin Department of Agriculture, Trade, and Consumer Protection (DATCP). Each year, Alice in Dairyland travels more than 40,000 miles throughout the state, promoting Wisconsin agriculture to various audiences. Additionally, she conducts hundreds of media interviews, speeches and school presentations. Applications for this rewarding role are accepted each January.

The Alice in Dairyland program began in 1948 with the selection of Margaret Jean McGuire of Highland, as part of Wisconsin's centennial celebration. It is organized by the Wisconsin Department of Agriculture, Trade, and Consumer Protection (DATCP) and headquartered in Madison, Wisconsin.

== Winners ==
Date of event	Location of event	Winner's name	Alice #	Hometown	School/Training
1948; June 20	Milwaukee County	Margaret Jean McGuire	1	Highland	UW-Whitewater
1949; March 20	Milwaukee County	LaVonne Hermann	2	Mount Horeb	University Hospitals
1950; March 20	Milwaukee County	Virginia Peterson	3	Union Grove	UW-Madison (BS) UW-Milwaukee (MS)
1951; March 20	Waukesha County	Marjean Czerwinski	4	Milwaukee	
1952; August 20	Outagamie County	Beverly Ann Steffen	5	Appleton	UW-Madison
1953	La Crosse County	Mary Ellen Jenks	6	Chippewa Falls	UW-Eau Claire
1954	Green County	Mary JcCabe	7	Ladysmith	UW-Eau Claire
1955	Marathon County	Barbara Brown	8	Stanley	UW-Stout
1956	Eau Claire County	Doris Olsen	9	Brooklyn	UW-Milwaukee
1957	Dodge County	Nancy Trewyn	10	Whitewater	UW-Whitewater
1958	Brown County	Barbara Haslow	11	Chili	UW-Madison
1959	Rock County	Merrie Barney	12	Burlington	Stephens College (MO)
1960	Richland County	Joan Engh	13	LaCrosse	UW-Madison
1961	Wood County	Carol Anderson	14	Superior	UW-Madison
1962	Dunn County	Sylvia Lee	15	Colfax	UW-Eau Claire
1963; June 9	Manitowoc County	Marilyn Katherine Draeger	16	Fort Atkinson	UW-Whitewater
1964	Milwaukee County	Beth Bartosh	17	Burlington	UW-Whitewater
1965	Dane County	Kathy Kenas	18	Rosendale	UW-Madison
1966	Eau Claire County	Jo Ann Cupery	19	Markesan	St. Olaf's College (MN)
1967; June 10	Brown County	Kristin Ann Williams	20	Colgate	UW-Oshkosh
1968	Kenosha County	Roberta Thoreson	21	West Allis	UW-Milwaukee
1969	Fond Du Lac County	Judith Schultz	22	South Milwaukee	UW-Madison
1970	La Crosse County	Susan Masterson	23	Janesville	UW-Madison
1971	Marinette County	Marsha Lindsay	24	Manawa	UW-Stevens Point (BS) UW-Madison (MS)
1972	Jefferson County	Deborah Moser	25	Wausau	
1973	Barron County	Mary Hopkins	26	Cumberland	UW-Eau Claire (BS) UW-Stout(PhD)
1974	Outagamie County	Joana Markevicious	27	Pine River	UW-Madison
1975	Grant County	Deborah Del Balso	28	Brookfield	UW-Madison
1976	Washington County	Janice Findlay	29	Burlington	UW-Madison
1977	Marathon County	Karyn Nelson	30	Barron	UW-Eau Claire
1978	Brown County	Laura Oldenberg	31	Burlington	UW-Stout
1979	Clark County	Rebecca Powell	32	Baraboo	UW-Madison
1980; June 14	Sauk County	Vicky Leah Scharlau	33	Waumandee	UW-Madison
1981	Dodge County	Debra Casucci	34	Beloit	UW-Madison
1982	Kenosha County	Dorothy Farrell	35	Oregon	UW-Madison
1983	Door County	Barbara Jo Ward	36	Fort Atkinson	UW-Madison
1984	Eau Claire County	Cynthia Johnson	37	Oregon	UW-Stout
1985	Marathon County	Lisa Hoesly	38	Juda	UW-Madison
1986	Grant County	Liz Henry	39	Dane	UW-Madison
1987	Dane County	Kristine Gratz	40	Darlington	UW-Platteville
1988	Manitowoc County	Rebecca Weiner	41	Ladysmith	UW-Madison
1989	Dunn County	Stephanie Binversie	42	Wauzeka	UW-Stout
1990	La Crosse County	Kim Nettesheim	43	Elkhorn	Cardinal Stritch
1991	Marathon County	Renea Troller	44	Rubicon	UW-River Falls
1992	Barron County	Kristan Conrad	45	Green Bay	UW-Madison (BS and MS)
1993	Rock County	Angela Corbin	46	Belleville	UW-Madison U of Illinois
1994	Monroe County	Angela Rule	47	Mineral Point	UW-Platteville (BS and MS)
1995	Rusk County	Jolynne Nagel	48	Antigo	UW-Madison
1996	Waupaca County	Holly Crowley	49	Walworth	UW-Madison
1997	Green County	Courtney Booth	50	Forest Junction	UW-Madison
1998	Eau Claire County	Jennifer Meyer	51	Monroe	UW-Madison
1999	Langlade County	Amy Brown	52	Loyal	UW-Madison
2000	Sauk County	Roxanne Peelen	53	Oconomowoc	Marquette
2001	Clark County	Sheri Hicken	54	Baraboo	UW-River Falls
2002	Wood County	Angela Hemauer	55	Plymouth	
2003	Fond Du Lac County	Natalie Parmentier	56	Green Bay	UW-River Falls
2004	Iowa County	Betsy Francoeur	57	Merrill	UW-La Crosse
2005	Taylor County	Gena Cooper	58	Mukwonago	UW-Madison
2006	Ozaukee County	Nicole Barlass	59	Sheboygan Falls	UW-Madison
2007	Chippewa County	Jill Makovec	60	Muscoda	UW-Madison
2008	Sheboygan County	Ashley Andre	61	Plymouth	UW-Madison
2009	Racine County	Cheryl O'Brien	62	Eastman	UW-Milwaukee
2010	Rock County	Christine Lindner	63	Beaver Dam	UW-Madison
2011	Waushara County	Katie Wirkus	64	Athens	UW-River Falls
2012	Grant County	Rochelle (Ripp) Schnadt	65	Lodi	UW-Platteville
2013	Calumet County	Kristin Natzke	66	Fond du Lac	UW-Madison
2014	Clark County	Zoey Brooks	67	Waupaca	UW-Madison
2015	Manitowoc County	Teyanna Loether	68	Sauk City	UW-Madison
2016	Dodge County	Ann Elizabeth O'Leary	69	Evansville	Carthage College
2017; May 13	Brown County	Crystal Siemers-Peterman	70	Cleveland	University of Minnesota
2018	Adams County	Kaitlyn Riley	71	Gay Mills	UW-Madison
2019	Green County	Abigail Martin	72	Milton	UW-Madison
2020	Walworth County	Julia Nunes	73	Chippewa Falls	University of Minnesota
2021^{[Note 1]}	N/A	Julia Nunes	74	Chippewa Falls	University of Minnesota
2022	Dane County	Taylor Schaefer	75	Franksville	UW-Madison
2023	Walworth County	Ashley Hagenow	76	Poynette	University of Minnesota
2024	Door County	Halei Heinzel	77	Oconomowoc	UW-Madison
2025	Crawford County	Sarah Hagenow	78	Poynette	University of Minnesota
2026	Marathon County	Anastasia Poull	79	Port Washington	South Dakota State University

Source: and

== Notes ==
1.^{1} Due to the coronavirus pandemic, the Wisconsin Department of Agriculture, Trade and Consumer Protection canceled the 2021 Alice in Dairyland Finals and allowed Nunes to continue as Alice in Dairyland for another year.
