= Ryde Racine =

Public transit in Wisconsin

RYDE Racine
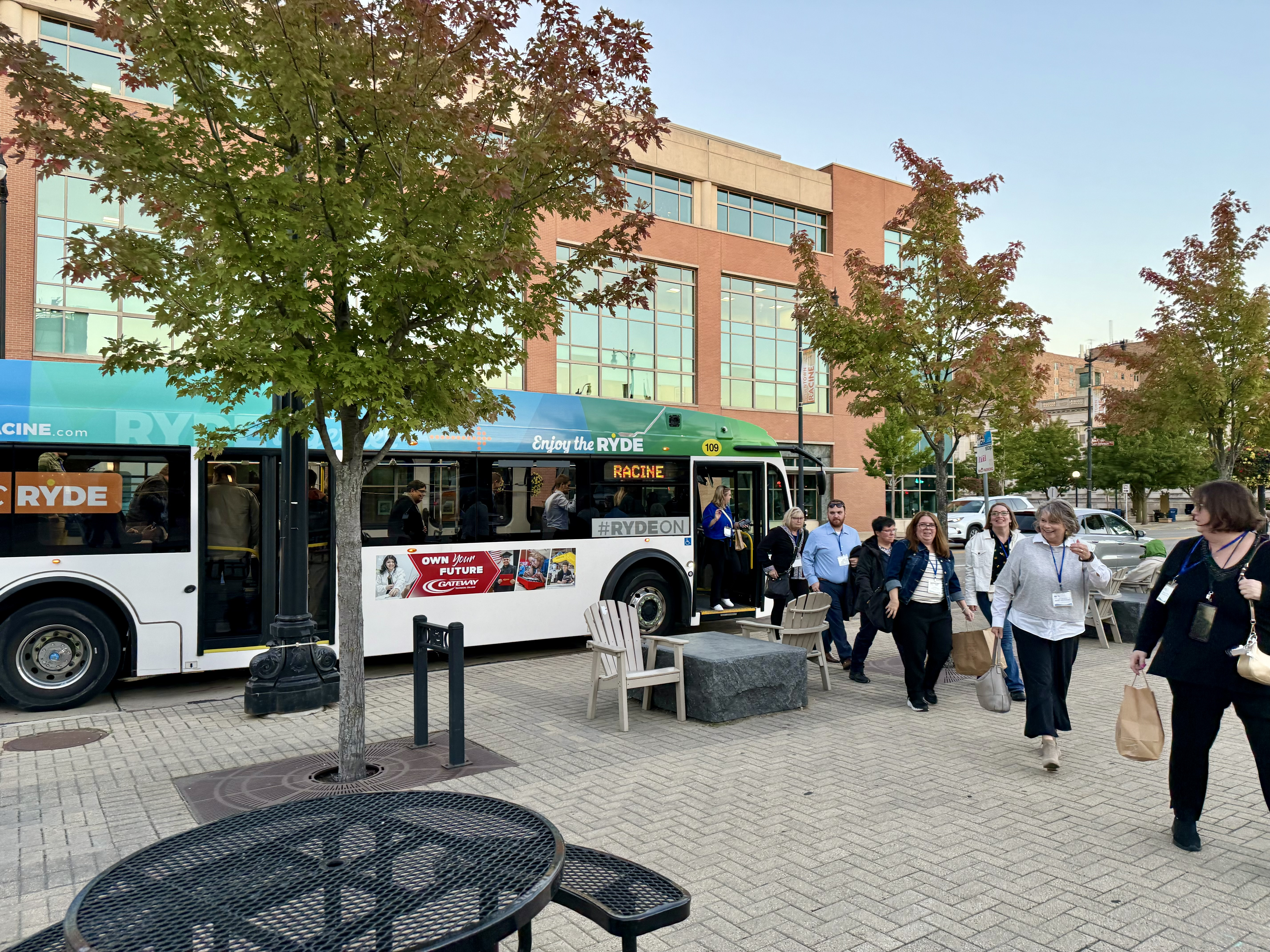
- RYDE Racine Bus on Monument Square in Downtown Racine
- Founded: 1883
- Headquarters: 1900 Kentucky Street; Racine, Wisconsin
- Service area: City of Racine and suburbs
- Service type: Bus service
- Routes: 9
- Stops: 727
- Hubs: 1
- Fleet: 41
- Annual ridership: 1,041,717 (2024)
- Operator: City of Racine
- Website: ryderacine.com

RYDE Racine is a public transportation agency, operated by the city, serving the city of Racine and villages of Mount Pleasant, Caledonia, and Yorkville in southeastern Wisconsin. The city-owned transit system, which is also a member of the Southeast Wisconsin Transit System, maintains a fleet of buses operating on nine bus routes. The city also provides paratransit services, branded as Dial A Ride Transportation (DART).

== History ==
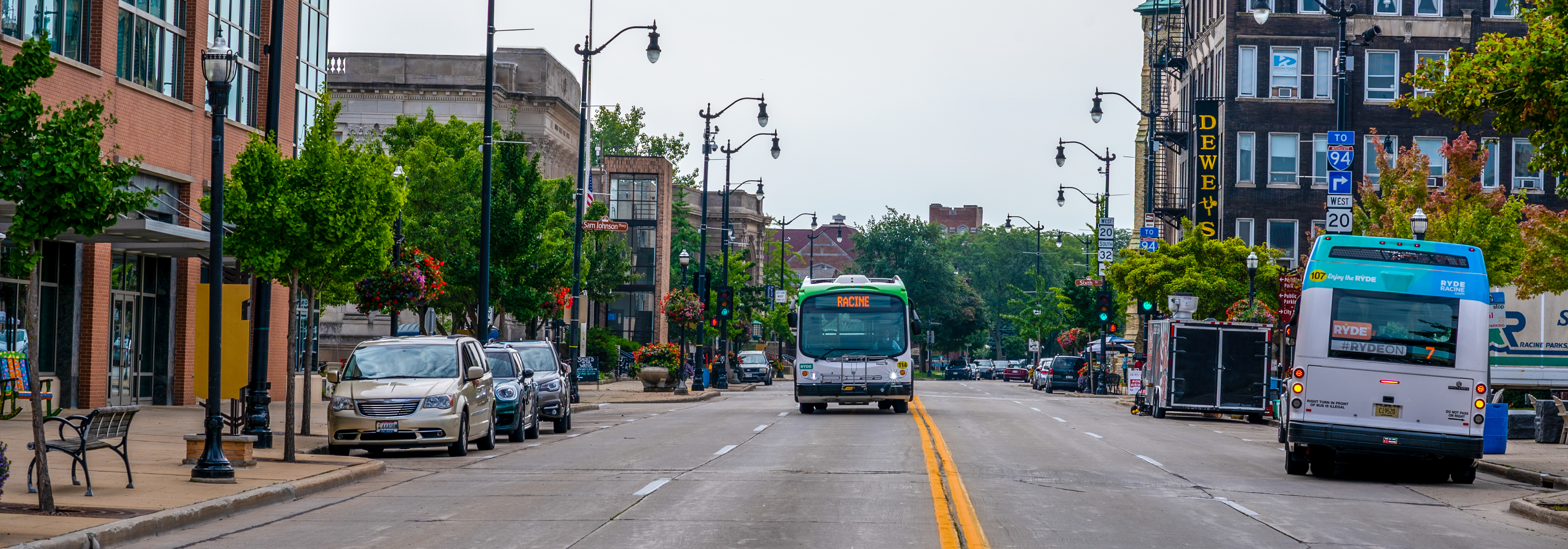
RYDE Racine Buses on Main Street

The Belle City Street Railway Company, Racine’s first transport system, began operation in 1883. The railway consisted of horse-drawn streetcars running on narrow-gauge tracks laid along the city’s unpaved streets. Its routes connected Racine’s three railroad depots and operated along State Street, Main Street, Park Avenue, 14th Street, and Junction Avenue, providing the city’s earliest organized local transportation network.

Buses in Racine were originally operated by Milwaukee Electric Railway and Transport Company, in addition to its streetcar lines in the city. The MER&T spun off the Racine bus system in 1939, selling it to Chicago engineer Henry P. Bruner, who began operating it as Racine Motor Coach Lines, Inc., on January 1, 1940. It was later owned by the Susquehanna Corporation, also the parent company of Kenosha Motor Coach Company and the Chicago North Shore and Milwaukee Railroad.

In 1962, Susquehanna sold its bus services in Racine and Kenosha to an official of the Madison Bus Company, who left Madison to take over management, and the Racine service was renamed "Lakeshore Transit-Racine". Lakeshore Transit ran into significant debts during its five years running the service. In February 1968, the company eliminated all evening, Sunday, and holiday service. The company then applied in March for permission from the Wisconsin Public Service Commission to discontinue bus service in Racine entirely. The city of Racine sought a replacement that could take over the service when Lakeshore Transit exited.

The Flash Cab Company started operations with its own buses. Flash City Transit began service on June 10, 1968. However, Flash's service also quickly became unprofitable, and starting in 1972, the company relied on subsidy payments from the city to keep it out of debt. In 1974, it was suggested that the city of Racine should take over the service, so that Racine would qualify for an Urban Mass Transit Administration (UMTA) federal grant providing new vehicles to publicly-owned transit systems. This plan was approved in a referendum on September 10, 1974, with 81 percent of voters supporting the public acquisition of the service.

The city assumed ownership of the bus system on July 1, 1975, with no changes to its services being made immediately. The service was given the new name "Belle Urban System", referring to Racine's nickname "the Belle City on the Lake" and with its acronym being "BUS". The UMTA grant provided the BUS with 25 new vehicles, each seating 41 passengers. These buses were put into service on May 22, 1976, coinciding with a redesign of local routes and the official introduction of the Belle Urban System name.

In November 2010, First Transit replaced Professional Transit Management of Racine as the company to manage the city's bus system. It had managed Belle Urban System from 1996 until 2003 when the Racine City Council awarded the management contract to Professional Transit Management of Racine. Bus drivers and managers of the Racine system become city employees after this contract expired in 2022.

In 2017, the City of Racine changed the transit system's name from Belle Urban System to RYDE Racine, and added commuter bus service to Chicago and the North Shore suburbs through Coach USA.

== Ridership ==
RYDE Racine's recent ridership trends between 2013 and 2024 can be divided into four distinct phases. Ridership initially grew from 2013 to 2014, reaching a peak of 1.47 million passenger trips amid improving economic conditions and stable transit demand. This was followed by a gradual decline from 2015 to 2019, mirroring broader nationwide trends that saw many small and medium-sized transit systems lose riders because of increased automobile ownership, low fuel prices, and changing travel patterns. Ridership then fell sharply during the COVID-19 pandemic, declining by more than 50 percent between 2019 and 2021 as remote work, school closures, and reduced travel significantly impacted transit usage. Beginning in 2022, the system experienced a strong recovery, with ridership increasing substantially over the next two years. By 2024, annual ridership had returned to approximately its pre-pandemic level, reflecting a successful recovery and stabilization of demand.

	Ridership	Change over previous year
2013	1,395,324	n/a
2014	1,474,670	▲5.69%
2015	1,364,547	▼7.47%
2016	1,257,983	▼7.81%
2017	1,211,699	▼3.68%
2018	1,160,864	▼4.2%
2019	1,041,115	▼10.32%
2020	681,778	▼34.51%
2021	518,515	▼23.9%
2022	618,997	▲19.4%
2023	1,037,031	▲40.32%
2024	1,041,717	▲0.5%

== See also ==
- List of bus transit systems in the United States
- Racine, Wisconsin
- Milwaukee County Transit System
- Hiawatha (Amtrak train)
