= Ackerville, Wisconsin =

- Unincorporated community
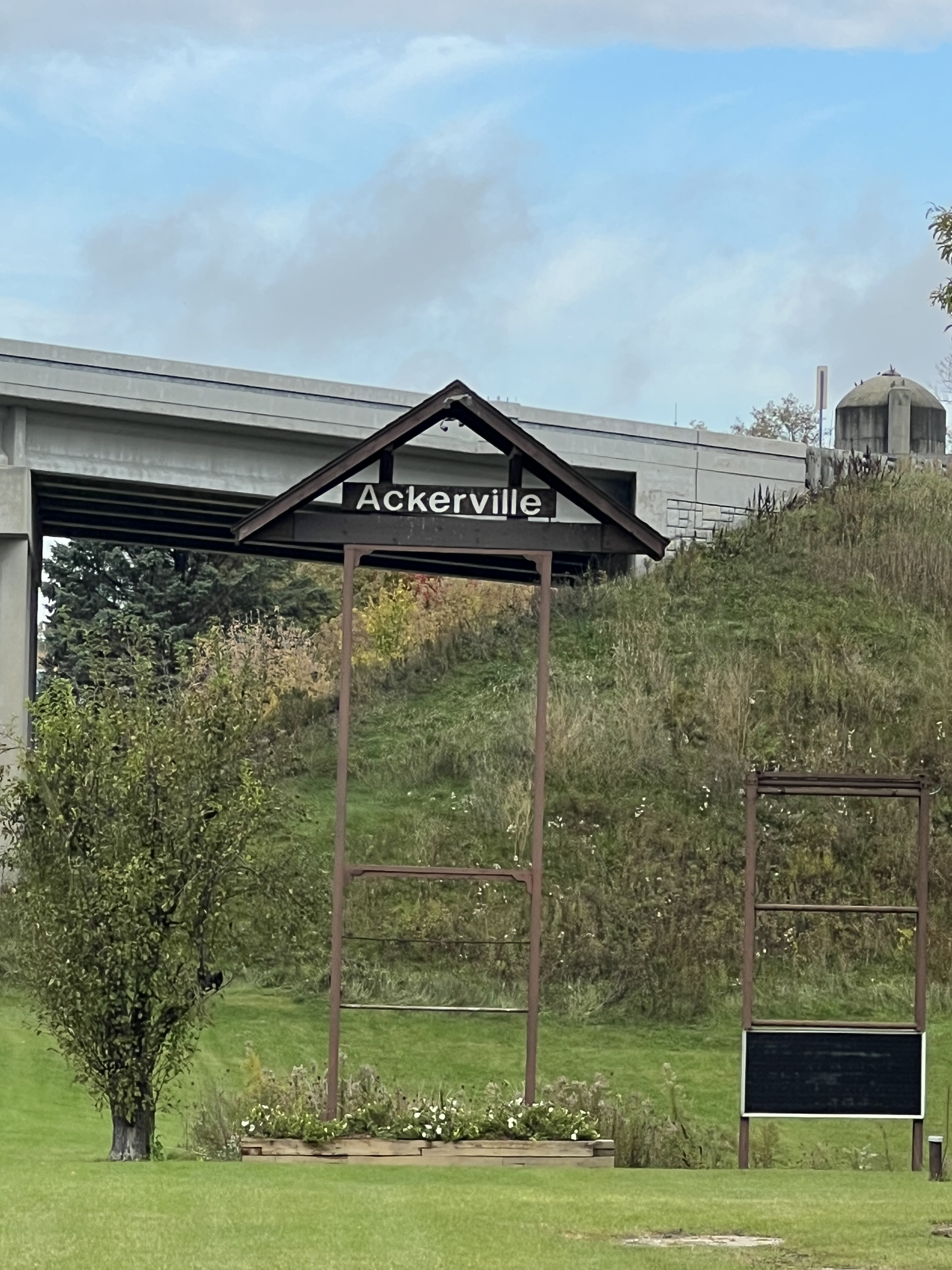

- Location within Wisconsin Location within the United States
- Country: United States
- State: Wisconsin
- County: Washington
- Elevation: 1,050 ft (320 m)
- Time zone: UTC-6 (Central (CST))
  - Summer (DST): UTC-5 (CDT)
- Area code: 262
- GNIS feature ID: 1560674

Ackerville is an unincorporated community in the town of Polk, Washington County, Wisconsin, United States. It is located on Wisconsin Highway 175 and Sherman Road, just due east of Wisconsin Highway 164 and south of the village of Slinger. It is less than 7 miles from Richfield and approximately 10 miles from Germantown.
