= Young America, Wisconsin =

- Unincorporated community
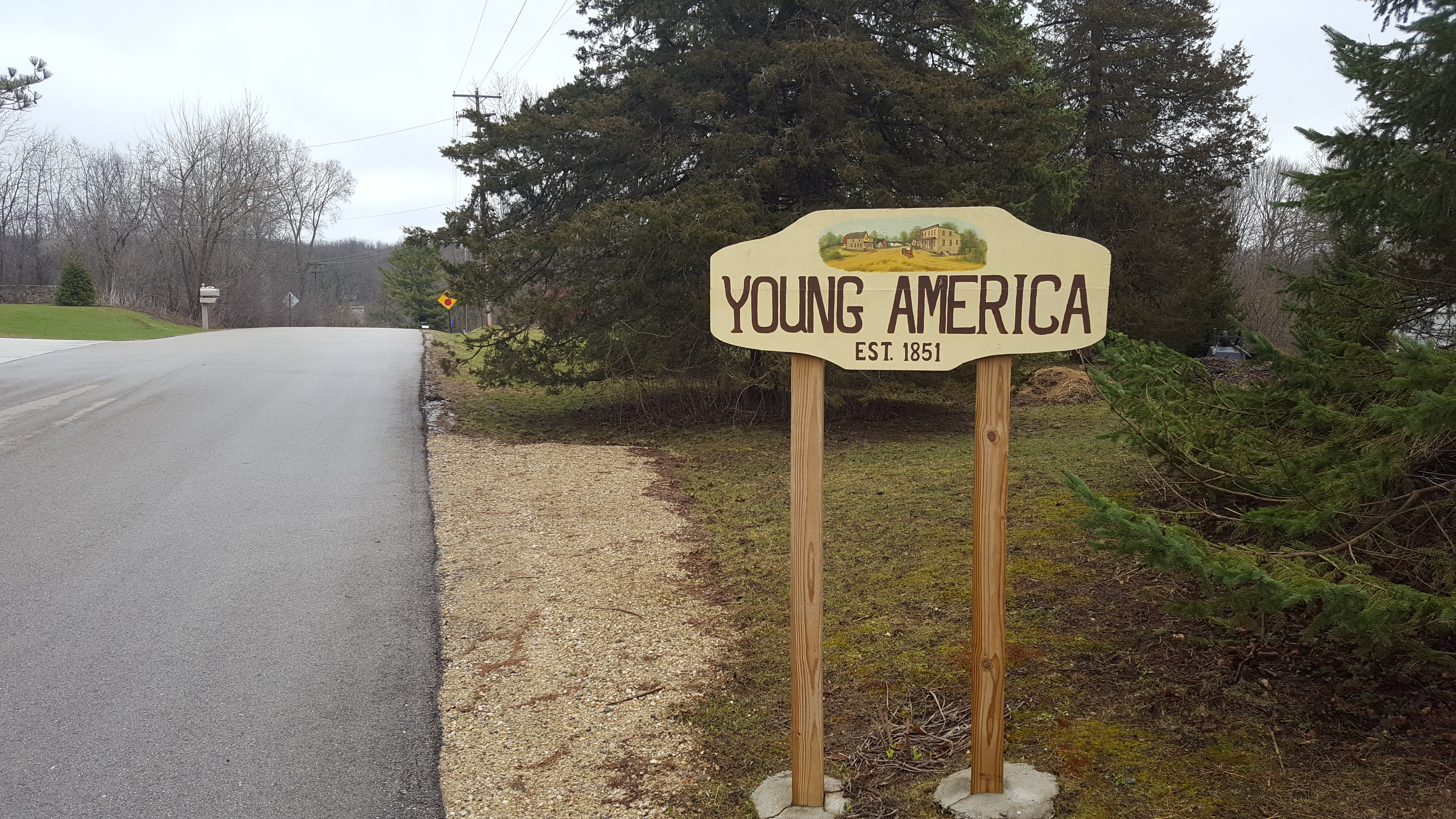

- Location within Wisconsin Location within the United States
- Coordinates: 43°27′06″N 88°11′09″W
- Country: United States
- State: Wisconsin
- County: Washington
- Elevation: 915 ft (279 m)
- Time zone: UTC-6 (Central (CST))
  - Summer (DST): UTC-5 (CDT)
- Area code: 262
- GNIS feature ID: 1577114

Young America is an unincorporated community located in the town of Barton, Washington County, Wisconsin, United States. It was founded in 1851.
