= Diefenbach Corners, Wisconsin =

- Unincorporated community
- Location within Wisconsin Location within the United States
- Coordinates: 43°21′13″N 88°15′38″W
- Country: United States
- State: Wisconsin
- County: Washington
- Elevation: 1,132 ft (345 m)
- Time zone: UTC-6 (Central (CST))
  - Summer (DST): UTC-5 (CDT)
- Area code: 262
- GNIS feature ID: 1563979

Diefenbach Corners is an unincorporated community in the town of Polk, Washington County, Wisconsin, United States.

== History ==
The community was named for Peter J. Diefenbach, who emigrated from Germany in 1853.
