= Polk, Wisconsin =

Town in Washington County, Wisconsin

- Town
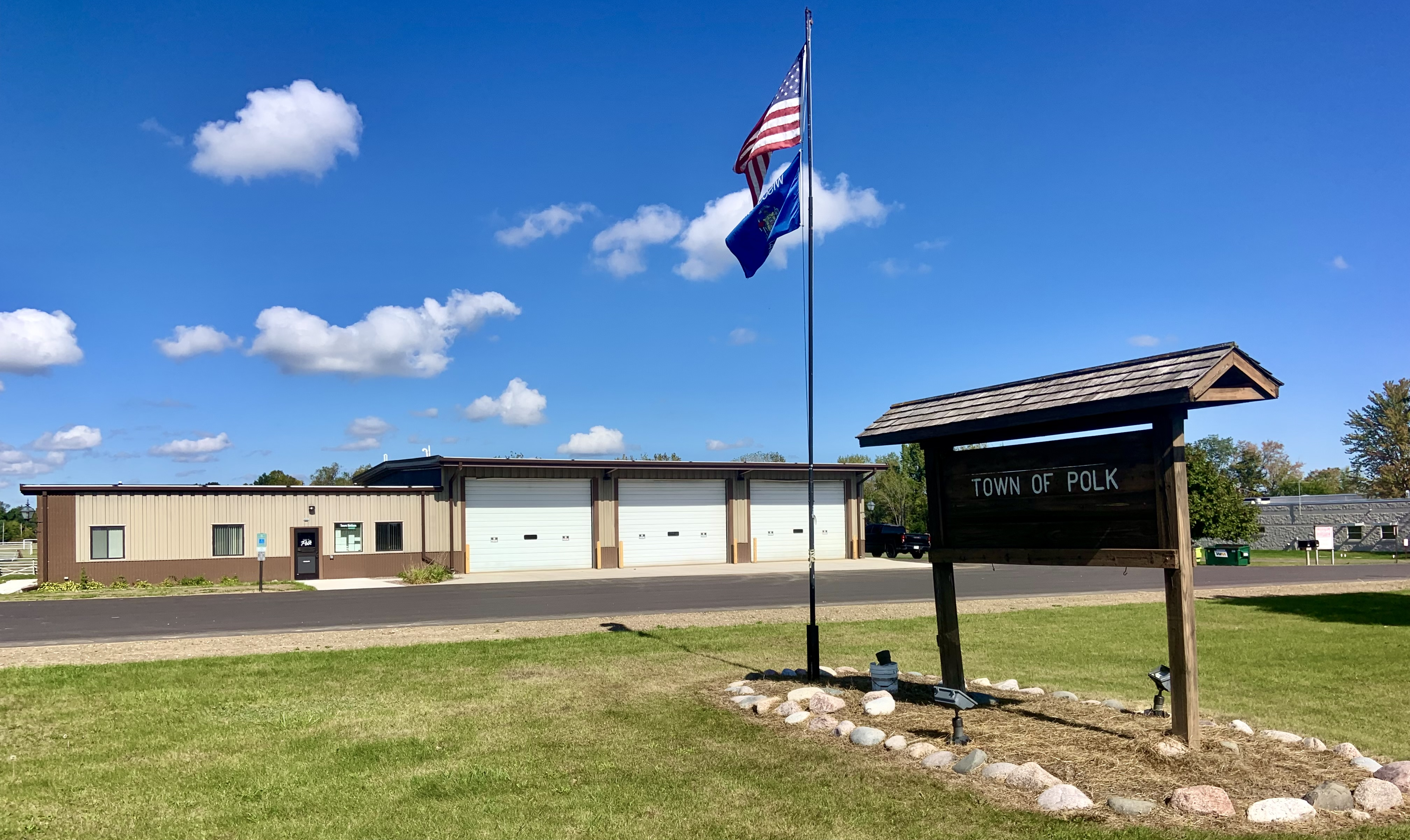
- Town hall

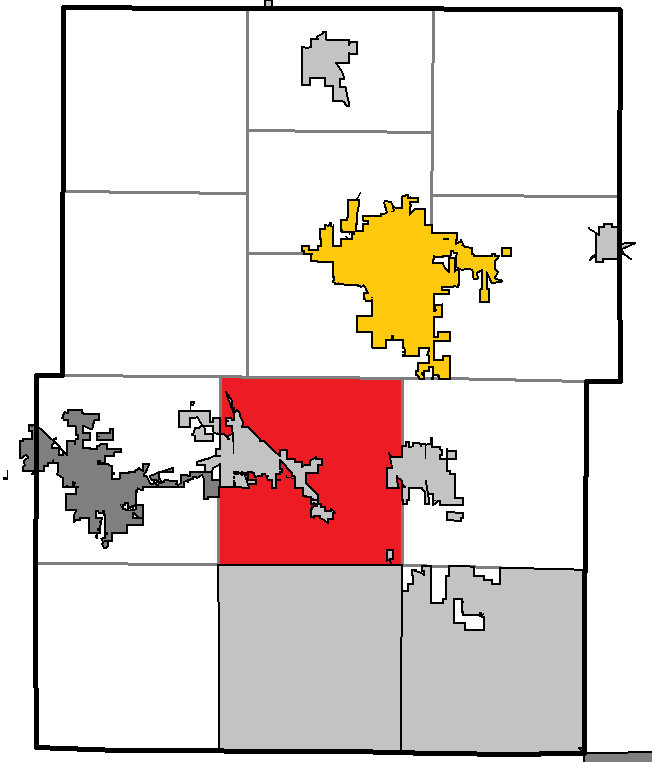
- Location of Polk, within Washington County
- Coordinates: 43°19′18″N 88°14′10″W
- Country: United States
- State: Wisconsin
- County: Washington
- Incorporated: January 21, 1846; 180 years ago

Area
  - Total: 32.2 sq mi (83.4 km^{2})
  - Land: 31.9 sq mi (82.7 km^{2})
  - Water: 0.27 sq mi (0.7 km^{2})
- Elevation: 1,122 ft (342 m)

Population (2020)
  - Total: 3,988
  - Density: 125/sq mi (48.2/km^{2})
- Time zone: UTC-6 (Central (CST))
  - Summer (DST): UTC-5 (CDT)
- Area code: 262
- FIPS code: 55-63875
- GNIS feature ID: 1583950
- Website: townofpolk-wi.gov

Polk is a town in Washington County, Wisconsin, United States. The population was 3,988 at the 2020 census. The unincorporated communities of Ackerville, Cedar Creek, Cedar Lake, Diefenbach Corners, Mayfield, and Rugby Junction are located in the town. The town derives its name from James K. Polk, 11th U.S. president, who was in office when the town incorporated in 1846.

== History ==
In the early 19th century, Polk was home to Potawatomi Native Americans, who surrendered the land to the United States Federal Government in 1833 through the 1833 Treaty of Chicago, which (after being ratified in 1835) required them to leave Wisconsin by 1838. While many Potawatomis moved west of the Mississippi River to Kansas, some chose to remain, and were referred to as "strolling Potawatomi" in contemporary documents because many of them were migrants who subsisted by squatting on their ancestral lands, which were now owned by white settlers. One band of strolling Potawatomi travelled through Dodge, Jefferson, and Washington counties, and was led by Chief Kewaskum, who had a camp on Pike Lake, west of the Polk area. Kewaskum was friendly with the white settlers who began arriving in the 1840s. He died sometime between 1847 and 1850, and the early settlers named the Village of Kewaskum in his honor. Itinerant Potawatomis lived in Washington County into the late 19th century, when many of them gathered in northern Wisconsin to form the Forest County Potawatomi Community.

In 1843, William Williamson purchased forty acres of land and became the first white settler in the area. Densmore Maxon was another early settler, arriving in 1844 to purchase forty acres along Cedar Creek and build one of the first sawmills in the area. Maxon would become a prominent figure in the community's early political scene. Baruch Schleisinger Weil arrived in 1845, purchasing nearly 2,000 acres and building a general store to supply settlers. The Town of Polk was organized on January 21, 1846, and named for James K. Polk, who was then President of the United States.

In 1855, Weil worked to have the La Crosse and Milwaukee Railroad pass through the Polk with a large depot on his land in Schleisingerville (present-day Slinger). The train also stopped at a station in the hamlet of Ackerville in the town. While the railroad initially led to local economic growth, the company failed in 1861. Many local landowners had taken out mortgages on land for the railroad in exchange for company shares. The company's failure left the landowners with mortgages to pay off, creating a local crisis in which some families were forced to sell their farms. The railroad was purchased and operated by the Milwaukee and St. Paul Railroad in 1863, and Schleisingerville continued to grow, incorporating as a village out of some of the town's land in 1869.

In the 20th and 21st centuries, the surrounding villages of Jackson, Richfield and Slinger, have annexed land from the town as they have grown and suburbanized. Despite losing some of its geographic area, the Town of Polk's population has more than doubled since 1960.

== Geography ==
According to the United States Census Bureau, the town has a total area of 32.2 square miles (83.4 km^{2}), of which 31.9 square miles (82.7 km^{2}) is land and 0.3 square mile (0.7 km^{2}) (0.87%) is water.

== Demographics ==
As of the census of 2000, there were 3,938 people, 1,352 households, and 1,139 families residing in the town. The population density was 123.3 people per square mile (47.6/km^{2}). There were 1,430 housing units at an average density of 44.8 per square mile (17.3/km^{2}). The racial makeup of the town was 98.70% White, 0.20% African American, 0.15% Native American, 0.15% Asian, 0.13% Pacific Islander, 0.33% from other races, and 0.33% from two or more races. Hispanic or Latino of any race were 0.91% of the population.

There were 1,352 households, out of which 38.3% had children under the age of 18 living with them, 77.2% were married couples living together, 3.6% had a female householder with no husband present, and 15.7% were non-families. 12.6% of all households were made up of individuals, and 4.7% had someone living alone who was 65 years of age or older. The average household size was 2.89 and the average family size was 3.16.

In the town, the population was spread out, with 26.9% under the age of 18, 6.7% from 18 to 24, 28.5% from 25 to 44, 27.5% from 45 to 64, and 10.4% who were 65 years of age or older. The median age was 39 years. For every 100 females, there were 105.0 males. For every 100 females age 18 and over, there were 105.6 males.

The median income for a household in the town was $62,933, and the median income for a family was $74,643. Males had a median income of $42,955 versus $33,750 for females. The per capita income for the town was $27,518. About 3.2% of families and 3.5% of the population were below the poverty line, including 2.2% of those under age 18 and 7.9% of those age 65 or over.

== Notable people ==
- Valentine Detling, Wisconsin businessman and legislator, lived in the town of Polk
- Louis D. Guth, Wisconsin businessman and legislator, was born in the town of Polk
- James Rolfe, Wisconsin farmer and legislator, lived in the town of Polk
