= Waukesha Metro Transit =

Public transit agency

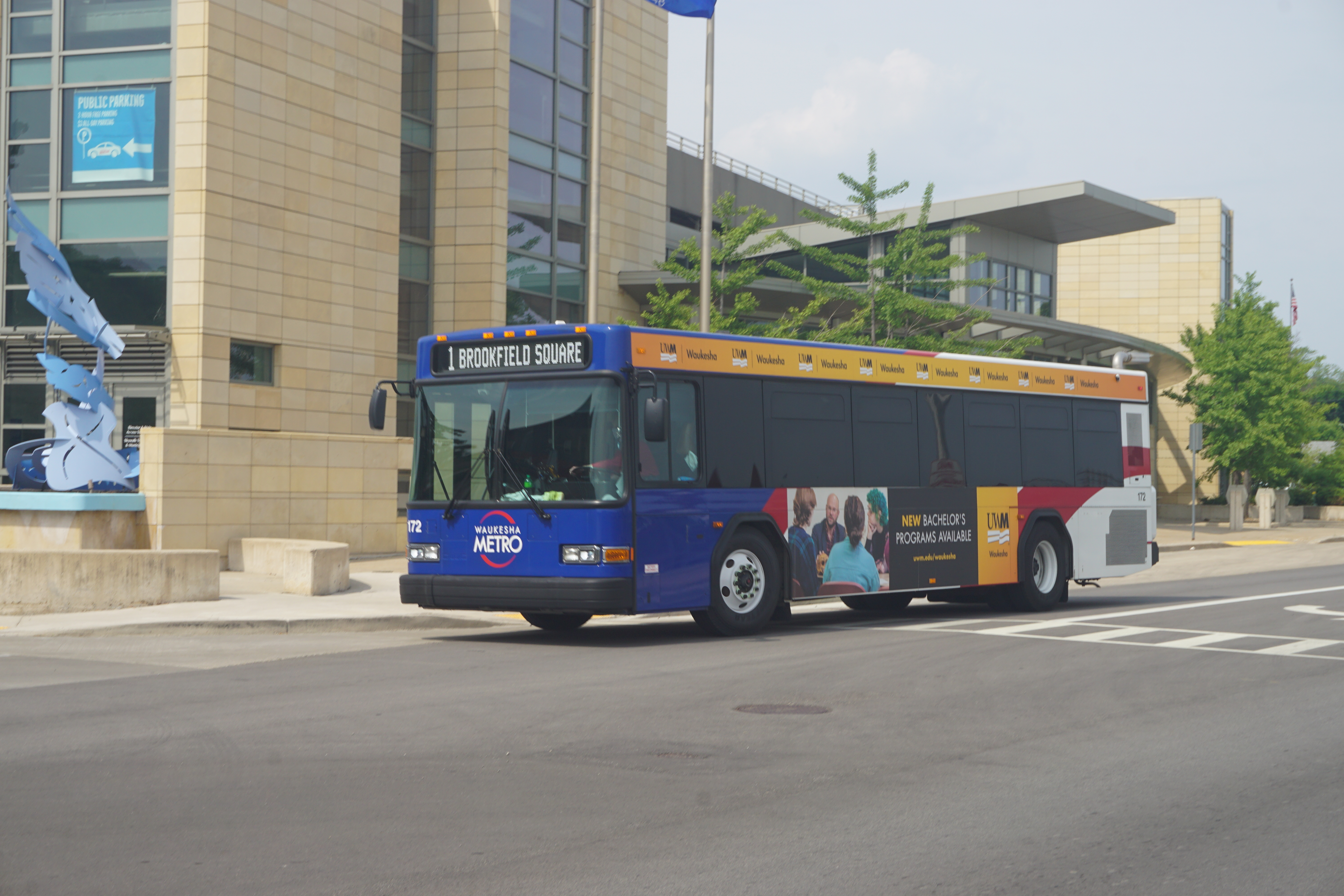
- A Waukesha Metro Transit bus in front of the transit center
- Founded: 1981
- Headquarters: 2311 Badger Drive
- Locale: Waukesha, WI
- Service type: bus service, paratransit
- Fleet: 45
- Annual ridership: 464,344 (2022)
- Operator: City of Waukesha (intra-county); Wisconsin Coach Lines (express)
- Website: waukeshametro.org

Waukesha Metro Transit is a public transit agency operating in the city of Waukesha and throughout Waukesha County. Founded in 1981, the system directly operates ten bus routes, contracts three commuter routes to Wisconsin Coach Lines, and partially funds two routes of Milwaukee County Transit System which extend into Waukesha County.

Waukesha Metro is also one of five transit agencies that are part of the Southeast Wisconsin Transit System.

== History ==
Following the approval of a referendum in 1980, Waukesha Metro Transit started operating in 1981, returning bus service to the city for the first time since 1977. Paratransit service, under the name Metrolift, began in 1982 under contract with Dairyland Buses Inc.

In 2023, Waukesha Metro began adding support for Milwaukee County Transit System's fare system.

As of September 2025, Waukesha Metro is planning on ending commuter service on routes 904 and 905. In June 2025 Waukesha Metro eliminated routes 2 and 7 and reduced service on routes 1 and 15.

== Services ==
No.	Route	Notes
1	Waukesha/Froedtert	Downtown Transit Center to Milwaukee Regional Medical Center; transfers with Milwaukee County Transit System Connect 1
3	Moreland	Downtown Transit Center to Target (Kossow Rd)
4	Grand	Downtown Transit Center to Wal-Mart
5	Prairie	Downtown Transit Center to The Shoppes at Fox River
6	St. Paul	Downtown Transit Center to Badger Dr via Kohls
8	Summit	Downtown Transit Center to North High School
9	Northview	Downtown Transit Center to Waukesha County Technical College
15	Racine	Downtown Transit Center to Meijer and South High School

== Downtown Transit Center ==
The Downtown Transit Center is located in downtown Waukesha at 212 East Saint Paul Ave. The center replaced the former transfer center, which was crowded on a road between the Fox River and the back end of buildings along West Main St. It serves as the central transfer point for 12 routes of the system's routes. It opened in October 2004 and provides an indoor waiting area, restrooms, 13 covered bus bays, a drivers’ lounge, and a customer service area. The Downtown Transit Center also includes a two-floor parking ramp for 460 vehicles. The opening was originally planned for late summer of 2004, but this was delayed due to WisDOT complaints that adjacent streets would be converted from one-way to two way in order to improve access and safety. These improvements eventually were allowed, and the center opened under the $16 million budget. The City of Waukesha implemented security upgrades to the Downtown Transit Center in 2017 and 2018.

== Ridership ==
In an October 2022 newsletter, the Southeastern Wisconsin Regional Planning Commission reported that Waukesha Metro Transit "performs very well", but recommends possible straightening of some routes if ridership doesn't return to pre-pandemic levels.

Waukesha Metro Transit ridership over time
Year	Ridership	Change over previous year
2013	1,206,354	n/a
2014	1,145,463	▼5.05%
2015	1,116,971	▼2.49%
2016	1,061,902	▼4.93%
2017	1,023,938	▼3.58%
2018	996,662	▼2.66%
2019	920,281	▼7.66%
2020	484,552	▼47.35%
2021	435,479	▼10.13%
2022	464,344	▲6.63%
2023	466,611	▲0.49%

== See also ==
- Beloit Transit
- Madison Metro Transit
- Milwaukee County Transit System
