= Germantown School District =

Public school district in Wisconsin, United States

Location
- N104W13840 Donges Bay Rd; Germantown, Wisconsin Washington County, Wisconsin United States

District information
- Type: Public
- Motto: Empower and Inspire Every Student to Success
- Grades: Pre-K–12th
- Superintendent: Martin Castro and Jake Misiak
- Schools: 6
- NCES District ID: 5505160

Students and staff
- Students: 3,835 (2024–25)
- Teachers: 247.83 (on an FTE basis)
- Staff: 475.47
- Student–teacher ratio: 15.47

Other information
- Website: www.germantown.k12.wi.us

The Germantown School District is a school district that serves the Village of Germantown, Wisconsin, the Town of Germantown, and the towns of Jackson, Polk, Richfield, Hubertus, the unincorporated community of Colgate. The district served 3,835 students as of the 2024–25 school year.

Each school in the district has a building leadership team and a Parent-Teacher Association to promote learning. Students are encouraged to participate in extra-curricular activities, including music, sports, and academic programs. The district motto is "Empower and Inspire Every Student to Success".

== Schools ==
=== Elementary schools ===
- Amy Belle Elementary School
- County Line Elementary School
- MacArthur Elementary School
- Rockfield Elementary School

=== Middle school ===
- Kennedy Middle School

=== High school ===
- Germantown High School

Home to the Warhawks, Germantown high school sports blue and gold as their school colors.

== Elementary school referendum ==
Because of the overcrowding in the elementary schools, a referendum for building a new elementary school was on the April 1, 2008 ballot and was voted down. The option was again given to residents on November 4, but was voted down, with 58% of voters saying no because of tax hike fears.
