= Joseph W. Holehouse =

American politician

Joseph William Holehouse (1836–1900) was a member of the Wisconsin State Assembly.

== Biography ==
Holehouse was born on July 5, 1836, in Stalybridge, England. His father, Joseph Holehouse (1814–1875), brought the family over to Wisconsin, purchasing land there in 1848. Joseph William married Wilhelmina Bridget "Millie" Larkins (1848–1925). They would have seven children. Holehouse died on March 13, 1900, in West Bend, Wisconsin.

== Career ==
Holehouse was a member of the Assembly in 1881 and 1882. Additionally, he was Assessor of Barton, Wisconsin. He was a Democrat.
