= Barton, Wisconsin =

Town in Washington County, Wisconsin

- Town
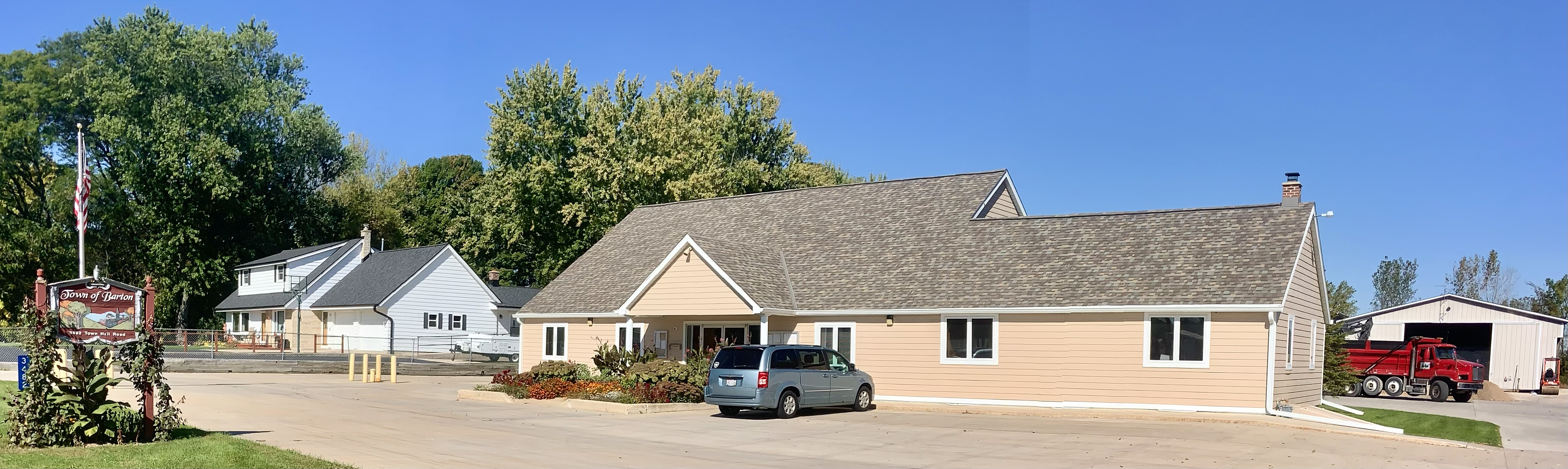
- Town hall

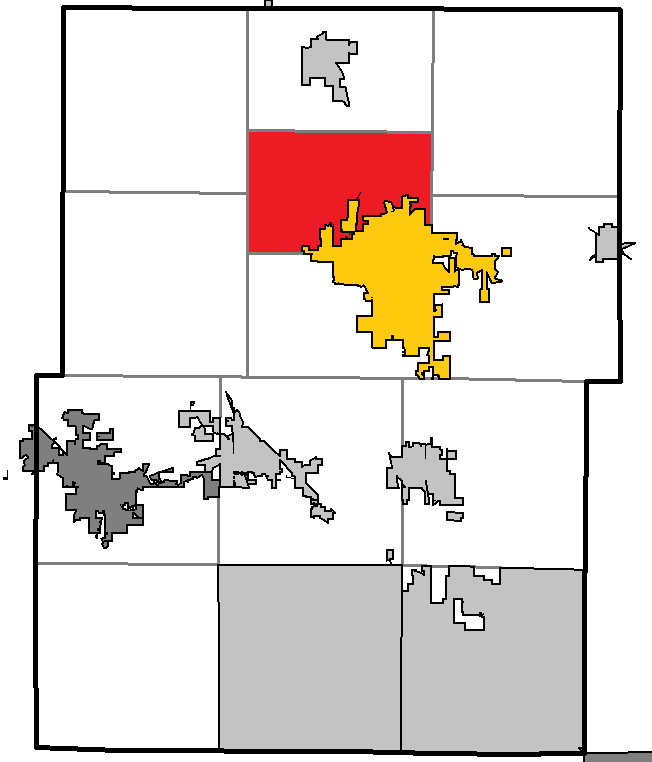
- Location of Barton, within Washington County
- Coordinates: 43°27′N 88°12′W
- Country: United States
- State: Wisconsin
- County: Washington
- Incorporated: 1848; 178 years ago

Area
  - Total: 19.5 sq mi (50.4 km^{2})
  - Land: 19.2 sq mi (49.8 km^{2})
  - Water: 0.23 sq mi (0.6 km^{2})
- Elevation: 1,030 ft (314 m)

Population (2020)
  - Total: 2,743
  - Density: 143/sq mi (55.1/km^{2})
- Time zone: UTC-6 (Central (CST))
  - Summer (DST): UTC-5 (CDT)
- Area code: 262
- FIPS code: 55-05050
- GNIS feature ID: 1582759
- Website: https://townofbartonwi.gov/

Barton is a town in Washington County, Wisconsin, United States. The population was 2,743 at the 2020 census. The unincorporated community of Young America is located in the town.

== History ==
The settlement of Barton began in 1845, when a land surveyor named Barton Salisbury arrived in the area from Mequon, and identified the rapids on the Milwaukee River as a potential source of hydropower. He built a sawmill, and soon other settlers arrived in the area, which was called Salisbury's Mills at the time. Salisbury went on to found the Village of Newburg before he died in a construction accident in 1849.

In 1848, the state legislature created the Town of Newark from land that had previously been part of the Town of West Bend, and in 1853 the Washington County Board of Supervisors changed the name to the Town of Barton in honor of Barton Salisbury.

Many sawmills and gristmills sprang up on the river in the town's early years, and by 1855, the town's population was over 1,000, making it larger than neighboring West Bend. The first settlers were predominantly German immigrant farmers. The first church was a German Methodist church established in 1850. In 1852, the non-German settlers in the town organized the Presbyterian Society of Newark. The first Roman Catholic service in the town was held on Christmas Day, 1857. On August 12, 1858, an Austrian missionary named Father Caspar Rehrl established the Roman Catholic Congregation of Sisters of St. Agnes in Barton and built the historic St. Agnes Convent and School. In its early years, the order was dedicated to education, and sisters worked in rural schools in Barton and surrounding communities.

In April of 1925, the Village of Barton was incorporated out of some of the town's land. A vote was held in the Town of Barton to determine if a village should be incorporated on April 21st, 1925. The results of the vote were 134 in favor and 90 opposed. Later on September 12th, 1961 another vote was held in the city of West Bend and the village of Barton to determine if the village should consolidate into the city. The results in the village of Barton were 384 in favor and 187 opposed, while in West Bend it was 1,147 in favor and 643 opposed. The village was annexed by the City of West Bend on November 1, 1961. In the 21st century, much of the Town of Barton's land is used for agriculture.

List Of Village Presidents (1925 - 1961)
Village President		Term in Office
1	Joseph Van Beek Office Established	April 21st, 1925 – 1934
2	Anthony H. Otten	1934 – 1957
3	Karl A. Steinert Office Disestablished	1957 – November 1st, 1961

== Geography ==
According to the United States Census Bureau, the town has a total area of 19.5 square miles (50.4 km^{2}), of which 19.2 square miles (49.8 km^{2}) is land and 0.2 square mile (0.6 km^{2}) (1.23%) is water.

== Demographics ==
As of the census of 2000, there were 2,546 people, 896 households, and 746 families residing in the town. The population density was 132.5 people per square mile (51.1/km^{2}). There were 919 housing units at an average density of 47.8 per square mile (18.5/km^{2}). The racial makeup of the town was 98.39% White, 0.16% African American, 0.04% Native American, 0.39% Asian, 0.04% Pacific Islander, 0.08% from other races, and 0.90% from two or more races. Hispanic or Latino of any race were 0.59% of the population.

There were 896 households, out of which 36.0% had children under the age of 18 living with them, 74.4% were married couples living together, 5.0% had a female householder with no husband present, and 16.7% were non-families. 13.4% of all households were made up of individuals, and 4.2% had someone living alone who was 65 years of age or older. The average household size was 2.84 and the average family size was 3.12.

In the town, the population was spread out, with 25.7% under the age of 18, 7.1% from 18 to 24, 27.8% from 25 to 44, 31.3% from 45 to 64, and 8.1% who were 65 years of age or older. The median age was 40 years. For every 100 females, there were 110.9 males. For every 100 females age 18 and over, there were 106.9 males.

The median income for a household in the town was $64,861, and the median income for a family was $69,730. Males had a median income of $43,245 versus $30,293 for females. The per capita income for the town was $26,039. None of the families and 1.7% of the population were living below the poverty line, including no under eighteens and none of those over 64.

== Notable people ==
- William Caldwell, Representative who was a member of the 1st Wisconsin Legislature
- Joseph W. Holehouse, Wisconsin State Representative
- James R. Lewis, evangelist, businessman and former Republican member of the Assembly who was removed from office after being convicted of perjury
