= Rugby Junction, Wisconsin =

- Unincorporated community
- Location within Wisconsin Location within the United States
- Coordinates: 43°17′31″N 88°13′07″W
- Country: United States
- State: Wisconsin
- County: Washington
- Elevation: 991 ft (302 m)
- Time zone: UTC-6 (Central (CST))
  - Summer (DST): UTC-5 (CDT)
- Area code: 262
- GNIS feature ID: 1577803

Rugby Junction is an unincorporated community in the town of Polk, Washington County, Wisconsin, United States.

== History ==
The night of October 16, 1901, two Chicago-bound freight trains collided on the Wisconsin Central Railway tracks between Colgate and Rugby Junction. Two cars derailed, but no injuries were reported.

== Notes ==
Preceding station	Soo Line	Following station
Slinger toward Portal	Main Line	Colgate toward Chicago
