= Thompson, Wisconsin =

- Unincorporated community
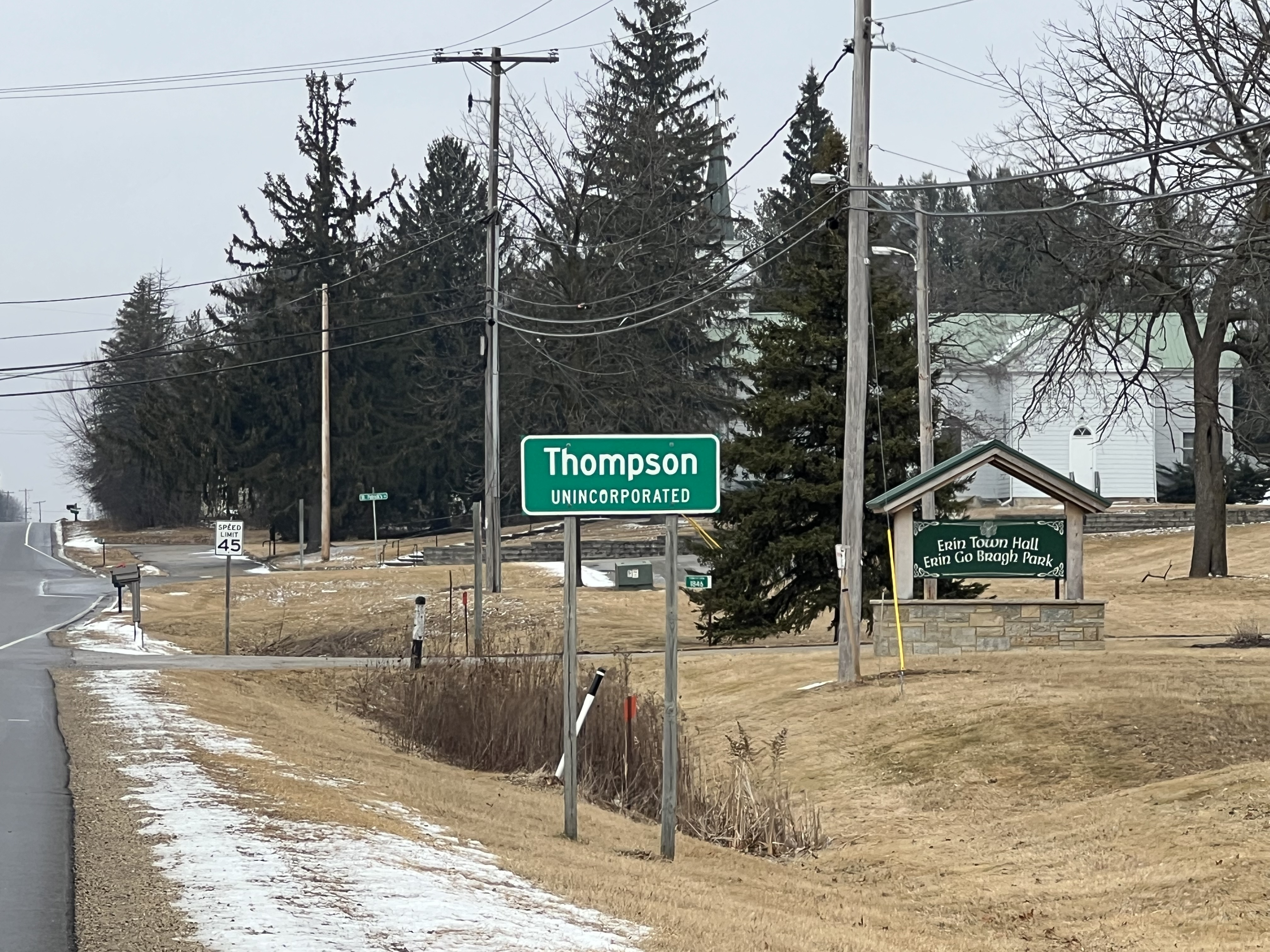

- Location within Wisconsin Location within the United States
- Coordinates: 43°15′31″N 88°22′14″W
- Country: United States
- State: Wisconsin
- County: Washington
- Elevation: 1,027 ft (313 m)
- Time zone: UTC-6 (Central (CST))
  - Summer (DST): UTC-5 (CDT)
- Area code: 262
- GNIS feature ID: 1575375

Thompson is an unincorporated community in the town of Erin, in Washington County, Wisconsin, United States. It is located near Holy Hill.
