= Colgate, Wisconsin =

- Unincorporated community
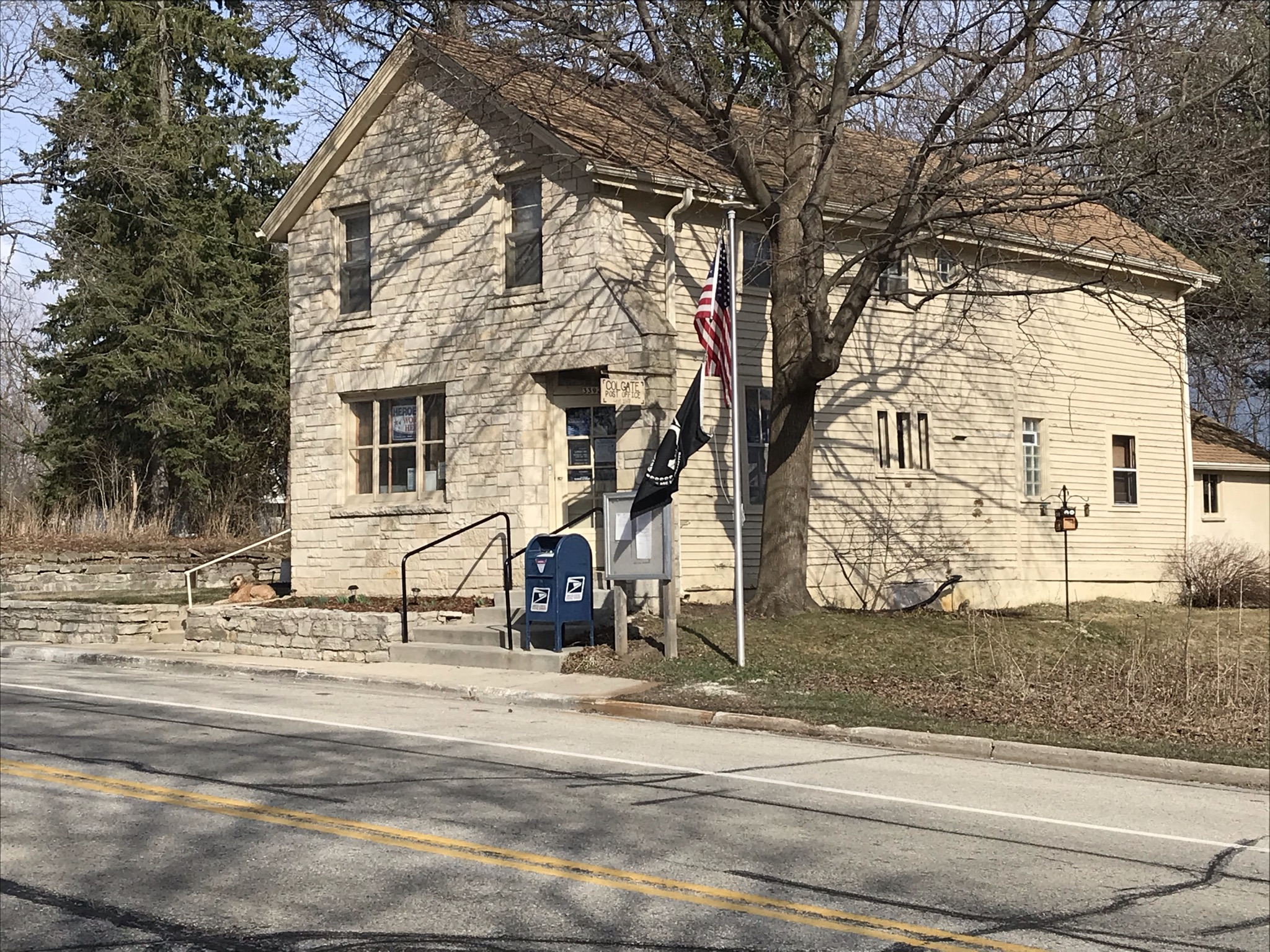
- The Colgate post office

- Location within Wisconsin Location within the United States
- Coordinates: 43°11′35″N 88°12′24″W
- Country: United States
- State: Wisconsin
- County: Washington, Waukesha
- Elevation: 981 ft (299 m)

Population
  - Estimate (February 2018): 300
- Time zone: UTC-6 (Central (CST))
  - Summer (DST): UTC-5 (CDT)
- ZIP code: 53017
- Area code: 262
- GNIS feature ID: 1563263

Colgate is an unincorporated community in Washington County, Wisconsin, United States, straddling the county line with Waukesha County. Colgate is located partially in the village of Richfield, and the village of Lisbon. Its ZIP Code is 53017. The population is around 300, up from about 50 in 1983.

== Geography ==
The Fox River, an Illinois River tributary, rises in a small, unnamed swamp, 1 mi (1.6 km) southeast of the community of Colgate. The Bark River also originates to the north and runs in a southwesterly direction.

The Canadian National Railway line runs North-South, and there was originally a depot there.

County Road Q, also known as County Line Road, is the main road in Colgate, and runs east-west along the border between Washington and Waukesha counties. It was formerly called Main Street.

== History ==
Colgate was known as Colgate Station at first. It was named after James Colgate, a construction engineer for the rail line that still runs through the community.

The post office was established January 11, 1887, with its first postmaster being Andrew Ennis, Sr. It operated out of the railroad depot on the Lisbon side of Colgate. Ennis was appointed on July 21, 1887. August B. Henshell was appointed postmaster in 1889. On August 30, 1898 Henshell was replaced by Max Manthey. Manthey owned the general store and was a supervisor on the Lisbon Town Board. On October 1, 1898 the post office relocated to the general store, which was also on the south side (Lisbon side) of the road. A cross-street on this side was named Wagner Street in his honor, which is now called Short Road. This also had a cross street called Melville Street, which no longer exists.

The night of October 16, 1901, two Chicago-bound freight trains collided on the Wisconsin Central Railway tracks between Colgate and Rugby Junction. Two cars derailed, but no injuries were reported.

On December 8, 1902 a fire broke out in the general store. Manthey, his spouse, seven children, and a servant were asleep at the time. Only Ms. Manthey and two of their children survived. The Manthey general store had also been destroyed by fire in the previous year.

The post office/general store was rebuilt December 15, 1903, this time on the northern (Washington County) side of the road. Theodore Roosevelt appointed Frank E. Stirn as postmaster.

On April 28, 1934, a 1929 coupe allegedly carrying members of the Dillinger Gang was seen in a Colgate garage, less than a week after the gang was spotted in Manitowish Waters.

Frank Stirn resigned as postmaster in 1946 and his spouse Elfrieda was appointed to the role by postmaster Robert E. Hannegan. She had the position until 1966.

The 20th Alice in Dairyland, crowned in 1967, was Kristin Williams of Colgate. The occasion resulted in the biggest parade the community has ever had, consisting of 89 vehicles proceeding what was then still called Main Street (now County Line Road/County Road Q).

Around 5:00AM on December 30, 1967, a house fire broke out in Colgate. Forty firefighters from surrounding communities responded, and Robert Pickhard from the Richfield Volunteer Fire Company lost his life battling the blaze. He is the only firefighter in the company's history to die in the line of duty.

The United States Senate confirmed Lynn E. Burton as postmaster on January 17, 1969.

In 1983 turkeys were rare enough in the area that when a friendly hen adopted downtown Colgate as her home, it made news. Postmaster Burton witnessed the bird's death from a hit and run collision in November of that year.

In November 1987, the former Stirn General Store and Post Office caught fire after standing for 84 years. Firefighters from Lisbon and Richfield put out the blaze, but the building was destroyed. The post office had already been moved to its current building to the east of where the fire was.

In 2018, echoing events of 35 years earlier, there were several cougar sightings in the area. Three sightings were in Colgate, and it is likely that all the sightings were of a single individual from South Dakota.

=== Management of the Colgate Post Office ===
Though many businesses have operated through the years there, the one constant is the post office. Though a number of businesses still operate in the Colgate ZIP Code of 53017, the post office is the only non-residential establishment still open in downtown Colgate.

Name	Title	Date appointed
Andrew Ennis, Sr.	Postmaster	January 11, 1887
August B. Henshell	Postmaster	June 13, 1889
Max Manthey	Postmaster	August 30, 1898
Albert E. Waudrey	Postmaster	February 2, 1903
Frank E. Stirn	Postmaster, 4th class	August 12, 1903
Elfrieda A. Stirn	Postmaster, 3rd class	February 1, 1946
Elenore Christison	Clerk-in-Charge	Dec. 31, 1966
Lynn E. Burton	Acting postmaster	March 10, 1967
Lynn E. Burton	Postmaster	January 17, 1969
Susan E. Thiel	Officer-in-charge	December 21, 1989
Lisa A. Pleasant	Postmaster	October 20, 1990
Renee J. Arciszewski	Officer-in-charge	March 20, 1992
Mary Jean E. Smoller	Officer-in-charge	October 1, 1992
Shirley A. Reith	Postmaster	May 1, 1993
John P. Eldridge	Postmaster	September 3, 1994
James Bucher	Officer-in-charge	January 7, 2011
Sheila Singleton	Officer-in-charge	August 10, 2011
Jacob Frank	Officer-in-charge	December 3, 2012
Mark Kluge	Officer-in-charge	May 9, 2013

On May 18, 2013, the Colgate post office was converted to a Remotely Managed Post Office. It no longer has its own postmaster and operates under the direction of the postmaster of the Hubertus Post Office.
