= Richfield, Wisconsin =

Village in Washington County, Wisconsin

- Village
- Location of Richfield in Washington County, Wisconsin
- Coordinates: 43°14′7″N 88°13′57″W
- Country: United States
- State: Wisconsin
- County: Washington
- Established: January 21, 1846
- Incorporated: February 13, 2008

Area
  - Total: 36.47 sq mi (94.5 km^{2})
  - Land: 35.92 sq mi (93.0 km^{2})
  - Water: 0.55 sq mi (1.4 km^{2})
- Elevation: 1,148 ft (350 m)

Population (2020)
  - Total: 11,739
  - Density: 326.8/sq mi (126.2/km^{2})
- Time zone: UTC-6 (Central (CST))
  - Summer (DST): UTC-5 (CDT)
- ZIP Code: 53076
- Area code: 262
- FIPS code: 55-67475
- GNIS feature ID: 1584022
- Website: www.richfieldwi.gov

Richfield is a village in Washington County, Wisconsin, United States. It is part of the Milwaukee metropolitan area and is located approximately 21 miles (34 km) northwest of Milwaukee. The village lies within the Kettle Moraine region of southeastern Wisconsin, an area formed by glacial deposits that includes rolling hills and kettle lakes. As of the 2020 census, Richfield had a population of 11,739.

The area was originally inhabited by Native American groups, including the Menominee and Potawatomi. White settlement began in the 1840s, and the area developed as an agricultural community. German and Irish immigrants made up a significant portion of early settlers. The local economy was initially centered on wheat farming before shifting toward dairy production, which remained dominant in the late 19th and early 20th centuries.

Beginning in the late 20th century, the village experienced increasing suburban development associated with the growth of the Milwaukee metropolitan area. Richfield was incorporated as a village in 2008 following a vote by residents.

== History ==
The area that is now Richfield was originally inhabited by Native Americans, including the Menominee and Potawatomi. In the early 1830s, the Menominee ceded their land to the United States through the 1831 Treaty of Washington. The Potawatomi ceded their territory in the 1833 Treaty of Chicago, which called for their removal by 1838. Most Potawatomi were relocated west of the Mississippi River, but some remained in Wisconsin where they lived on ancestral lands by squatting in areas now occupied by white settlement.

White settlement in the Richfield area began in 1841 with the arrival of early land purchasers. On May 31 of that year, land speculator Samuel Spivey acquired 600 acres, followed weeks later by Jacob Snyder, who became the first permanent white settler after purchasing land on July 9, 1841.

By 1843, German immigrants, particularly from Hesse-Darmstadt, had begun establishing farms in the area, contributing to the development of a growing rural community. In 1845, German Catholic settlers built the first church in the area, dedicating it to Saint Hubertus. The surrounding region is now the unincorporated community of Hubertus.

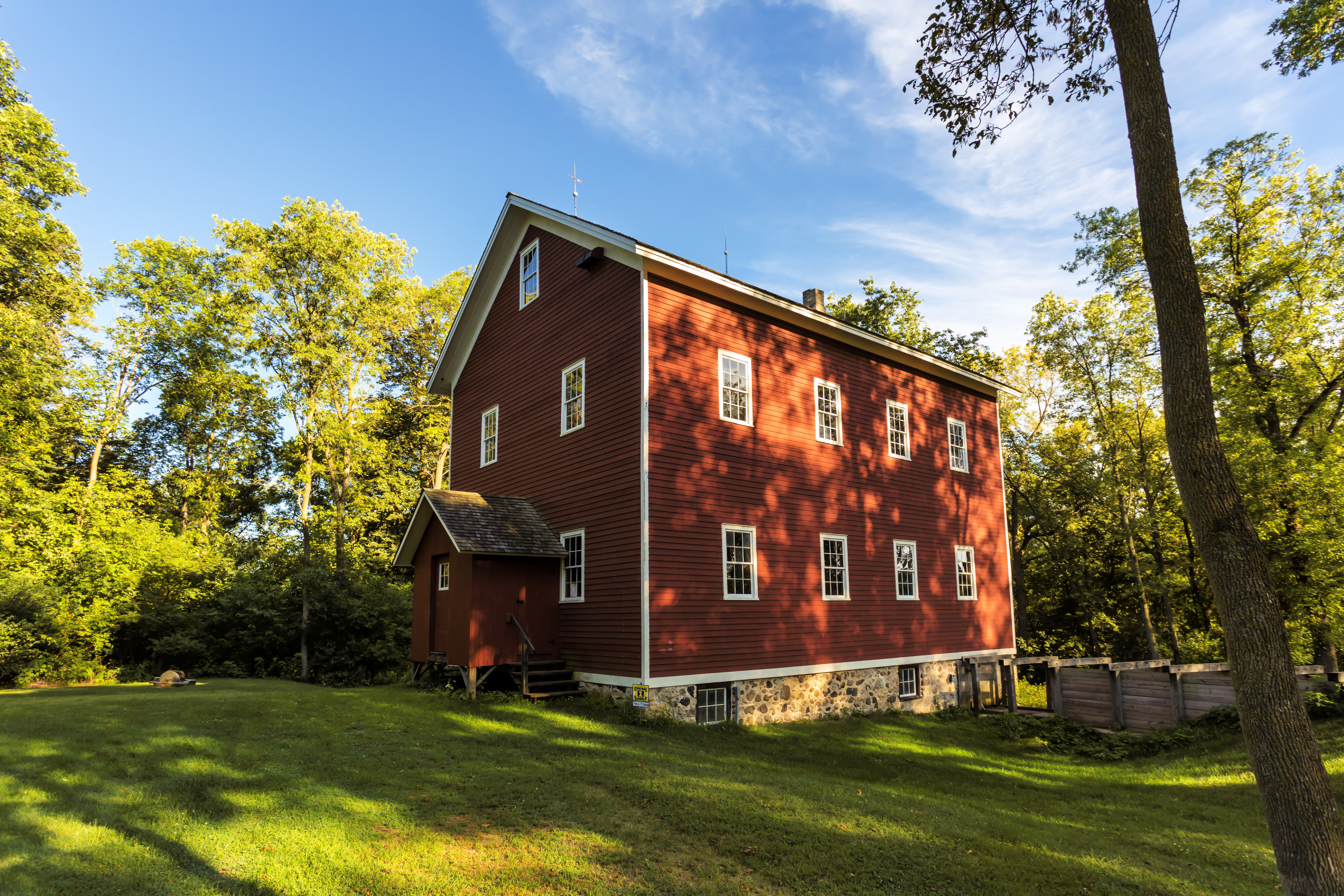
The Messer-Mayer Gristmill was built on Coney Creek in Richfield in 1871-73. The building is listed on the National Register of Historic Places.

The Town of Richfield was organized on January 21, 1846. By 1848, the majority of the town's land was held by Irish and German immigrant farmers. During this period, the local economy was primarily driven by wheat farming. This remained the dominant output until the 1880s, when a shift toward dairy farming occurred in Richfield and throughout Wisconsin.

In 1855, the La Crosse and Milwaukee Railroad was constructed through the town. To finance the railroad's expansion, many local landowners took out mortgages on their land in exchange for company shares. The company failed in 1861, leaving the farmers with valueless shares but active mortgages to pay off. This created a local crisis in which several families were forced to sell their farms to satisfy the debt.

In the early 20th century, camps and other recreational facilities began to be established on the shores of the local kettle lakes, including YMCA Camp Minikani on Lake Amy Belle.

The town remained primarily agricultural until the 1970s, when suburbanization led to increased real estate development and a decline in farming. On November 6, 2007, residents voted to incorporate the town as a village. The measure passed by a 3-to-1 margin, and the Village of Richfield was officially established on February 13, 2008.

== Geography ==
Richfield is located in the southern part of Washington County in southeastern Wisconsin. The village is located approximately 21 miles (34 km) northwest of Milwaukee and is part of the Milwaukee metropolitan area. It is bordered by the communities of Polk to the north, Germantown to the east, Lisbon to the south, and Erin to the west.

According to the United States Census Bureau, the village has a total area of 36.47 square miles (94.46 km^{2}), of which 35.92 square miles (93.03 km^{2}) is land and 0.55 square miles (1.42 km^{2}) is water. Richfield lies within the Kettle Moraine region, characterized by rolling hills and kettle lakes, including Friess Lake, which is the largest in the village. Unincorporated communities within the village include Hubertus and parts of Colgate and Lake Five.

== Demographics ==
Historical population
Census	Pop.	Note	%±
1900	1,617		—
1910	1,615		−0.1%
1920	1,467		−9.2%
1930	1,487		1.4%
1940	1,564		5.2%
1950	2,077		32.8%
1960	3,172		52.7%
1970	5,923		86.7%
1980	8,390		41.7%
1990	8,993		7.2%
2000	10,373		15.3%
2010	11,300		8.9%
2020	11,739		3.9%
U.S. Decennial Census

=== 2020 census ===
As of the 2020 census, Richfield had a population of 11,739. The median age was 48.7 years. 21.1% of residents were under the age of 18 and 19.7% of residents were 65 years of age or older. For every 100 females there were 102.6 males, and for every 100 females age 18 and over there were 102.8 males age 18 and over.

3.0% of residents lived in urban areas, while 97.0% lived in rural areas.

There were 4,492 households in Richfield, of which 29.1% had children under the age of 18 living in them. Of all households, 73.3% were married-couple households, 11.5% were households with a male householder and no spouse or partner present, and 10.5% were households with a female householder and no spouse or partner present. About 14.8% of all households were made up of individuals and 7.2% had someone living alone who was 65 years of age or older.

There were 4,660 housing units, of which 3.6% were vacant. The homeowner vacancy rate was 0.4% and the rental vacancy rate was 3.1%.

Racial composition as of the 2020 census
Race	Number	Percent
White	11,121	94.7%
Black or African American	70	0.6%
American Indian and Alaska Native	11	0.1%
Asian	154	1.3%
Native Hawaiian and Other Pacific Islander	1	0.0%
Some other race	60	0.5%
Two or more races	322	2.7%
Hispanic or Latino (of any race)	177	1.5%

=== 2010 census ===
As of the 2010 census, there were 11,300 people, 4,170 households, and 3,465 families living in the village. The population density was 314.7 inhabitants per square mile (121.5/km^{2}). There were 4,338 housing units at an average density of 120.8 per square mile (46.6/km^{2}). The racial makeup of the village was 96.9% White, 0.8% African American, 0.3% Native American, 1.1% Asian, 0.4% from other races, and 0.5% from two or more races. Hispanic or Latino of any race were 1.4% of the population.

There were 4,170 households, of which 34.1% had children under the age of 18 living with them, 75.6% were married couples living together, 4.1% had a female householder with no husband present, 3.3% had a male householder with no wife present, and 16.9% were non-families. 13.7% of all households were made up of individuals, and 5.2% had someone living alone who was 65 years of age or older. The average household size was 2.71 and the average family size was 2.99.

The median age in the village was 45 years. 23.9% of residents were under the age of 18; 5.9% were between the ages of 18 and 24; 20.3% were from 25 to 44; 37.5% were from 45 to 64; and 12.5% were 65 years of age or older. The gender makeup of the village was 51.1% male and 48.9% female.

=== 2000 census ===
As of the 2000 census, there were 10,373 people, 3,614 households, and 3,111 families living in the town. The population density was 289.2 people per square mile (111.7/km^{2}). There were 3,766 housing units at an average density of 105.0 per square mile (40.5/km^{2}). The racial makeup of the village was 98.28% White, 0.23% African American, 0.04% Native American, 0.67% Asian, 0.07% Pacific Islander, 0.11% from other races, and 0.61% from two or more races. Hispanic or Latino of any race were 0.70% of the population.

There were 3,614 households, out of which 38.7% had children under the age of 18 living with them, 78.7% were married couples living together, 4.3% had a female householder with no husband present, and 13.9% were non-families. 11.0% of all households were made up of individuals, and 3.3% had someone living alone who was 65 years of age or older. The average household size was 2.87 and the average family size was 3.10.

In the village the population was spread out, with 26.6% under the age of 18, 6.1% from 18 to 24, 29.1% from 25 to 44, 30.1% from 45 to 64, and 8.1% who were 65 years of age or older. The median age was 39 years. For every 100 females, there were 106.6 males. For every 100 females age 18 and over, there were 104.6 males.

The median income for a household in the village was $72,809, and the median income for a family was $77,572. Males had a median income of $52,048 versus $31,156 for females. The per capita income for the village was $29,859. About 1.1% of families and 1.3% of the population were below the poverty line, including 0.4% of those under age 18 and 3.7% of those age 65 or over.

== Education ==
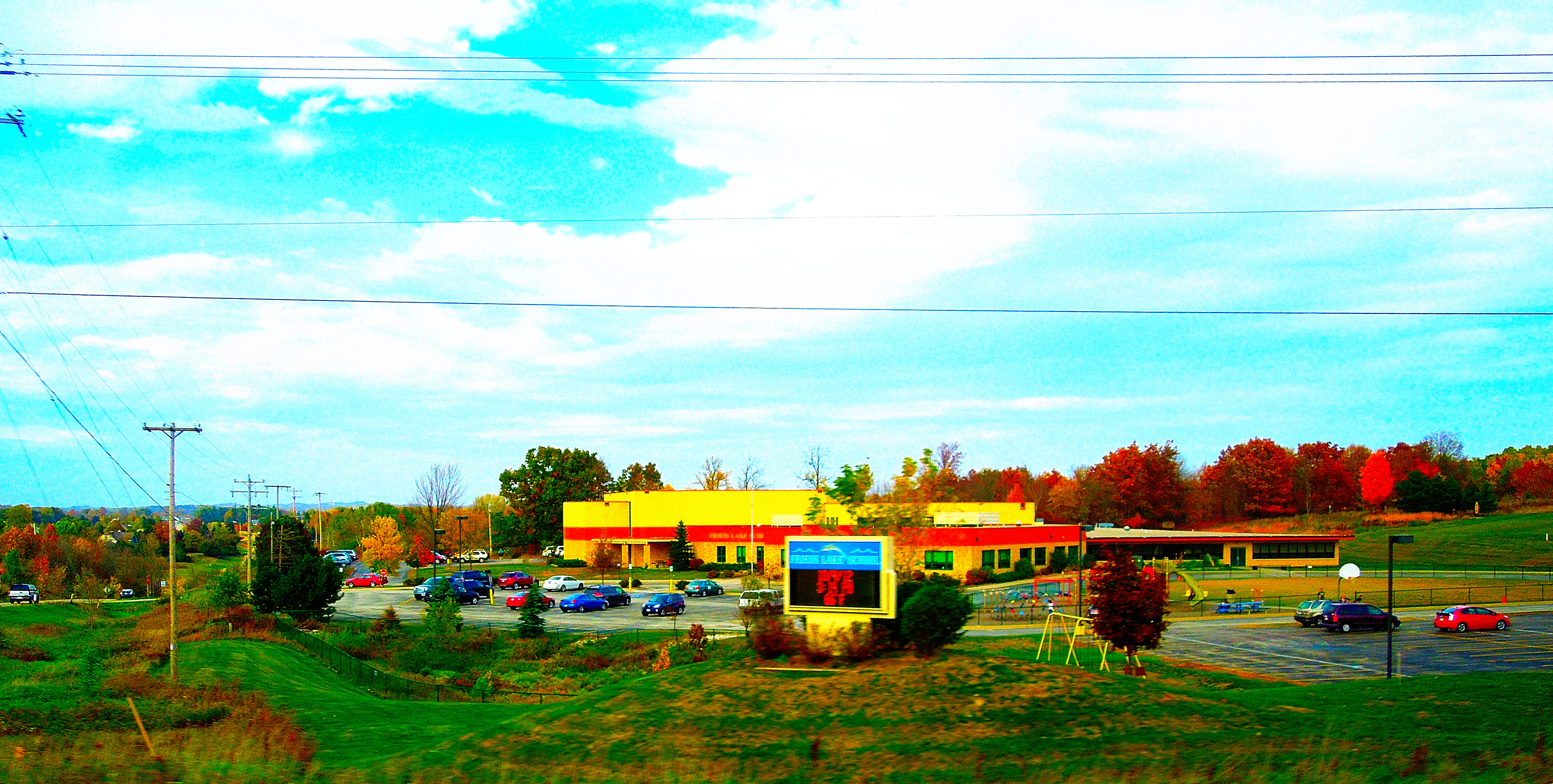
Freiss Lake School

Most portions are in the Holy Hill Area School District and the Hartford Union High School District. Portions of Richfield to the north and northwest are in the Slinger School District, a K-12 school district. Portions of Richfield to the northeast and southeast are in the Germantown School District, another K-12 school district.

The Holy Hill Area School District includes Friess Lake Elementary School and Richfield Middle School. Amy Belle Elementary School, located in the southeast portion of the village, is part of the Germantown School District.

== Notable residents ==
- Josh Bilicki, racing driver
- Alex Kister, creator of the Mandela Catalogue
