= Erin, Wisconsin =

Town in Washington County, Wisconsin

- Town
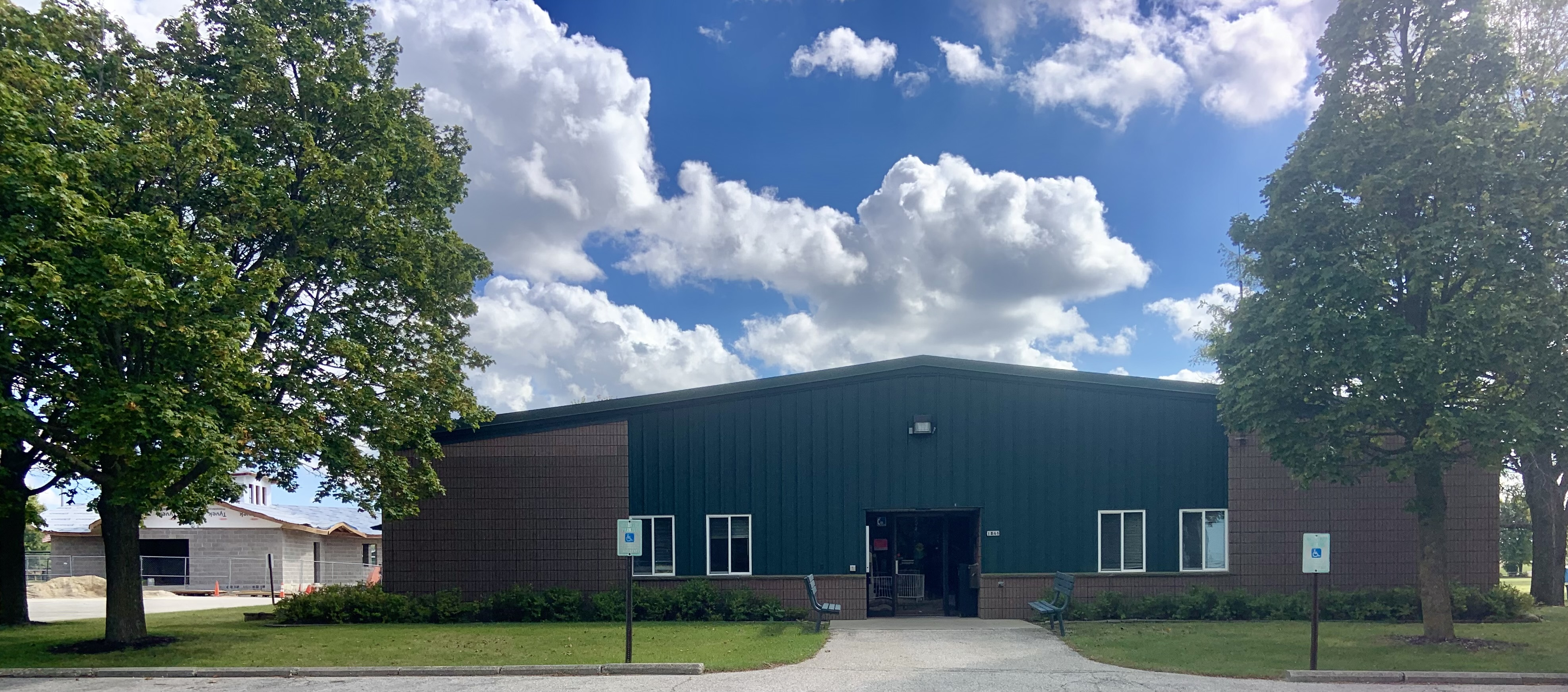
- Town hall in Thompson, Wisconsin
- Motto: Erin Go Bragh
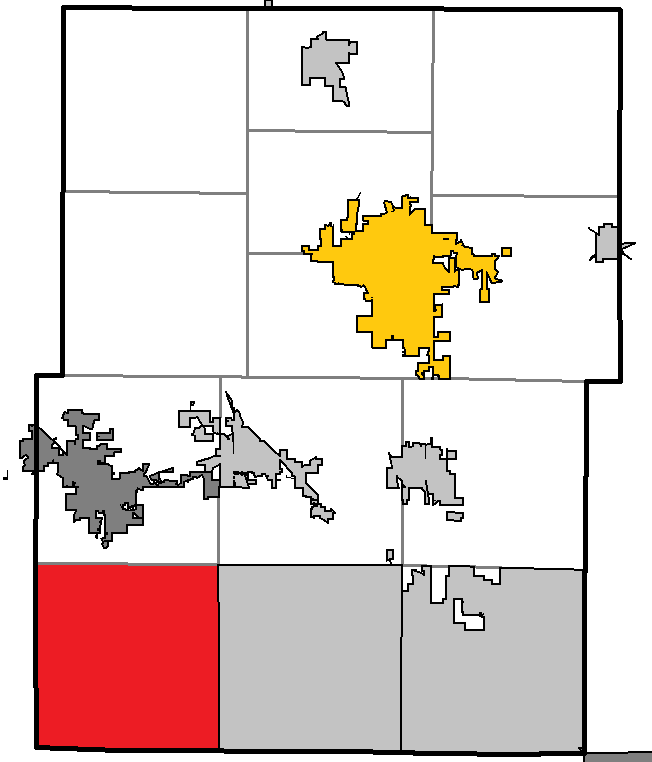
- Location of Erin, within Washington County
- Coordinates: 43°14′17″N 88°21′11″W
- Country: United States
- State: Wisconsin
- County: Washington

Area
  - Total: 36.3 sq mi (94.0 km^{2})
  - Land: 35.9 sq mi (92.9 km^{2})
  - Water: 0.42 sq mi (1.1 km^{2})
- Elevation: 1,010 ft (308 m)

Population (2020)
  - Total: 3,825
  - Density: 107/sq mi (41.2/km^{2})
- Time zone: UTC-6 (Central (CST))
  - Summer (DST): UTC-5 (CDT)
- Area code: 262
- FIPS code: 55-24225
- GNIS feature ID: 1583171
- Website: www.erintownship.com

Erin is a town in Washington County, Wisconsin, United States. The population was 3,825 at the 2020 census. The unincorporated community of Thompson is located in Erin.

Erin is home to Erin Hills golf course which hosted the 2017 U.S. Open golf tournament.

== History ==
Until the 1830s, the Erin area was home to Menominee and Potawatomi Native Americans Native American oral traditions claimed that Jesuit missionaries were the first white people to arrive in the area, possibly as early as the 1670s. Some historians have claimed that Jacques Marquette and Louis Jolliet stopped in the Erin area on their 1673–1674 journey to find the Rock River and planted a wooden cross on the summit of Holy Hill. However, no one has been able to determine with certainty who the first explorers to visit the area were, because Jesuit accounts often do not describe landmarks with specific enough details for historians to draw definitive conclusions.

The Potawatomi surrendered their claims to the land the United States Federal Government in 1833 through the 1833 Treaty of Chicago, which (after being ratified in 1835) required them to leave Wisconsin by 1838. While many Potawatomis moved west of the Mississippi River to Kansas, some chose to remain, and were referred to as "strolling Potawatomi" in contemporary documents because many of them were migrants who subsisted by squatting on their ancestral lands, which were now owned by white settlers. Itinerant Native Americans lived in Washington County into the late 19th century, when many of them gathered in northern Wisconsin to form the Forest County Potawatomi Community.

The Wisconsin Territorial Legislature created the Town of Erin on January 16, 1846. It was possibly named for Erin, the romantic, Hiberno-English name for Ireland, from which many many of the early settlers had emigrated. As recently as 1940, nearly ninety percent of the town's population claimed Irish descent.

Since its founding, Erin has been a primarily agricultural community, with dairy farming playing an important role in the local economy. Early businesses included blacksmiths, general stores, and creameries that supported the local farmers.

Since the town's first decades, Erin has had a large Catholic community. In the 1860s, a Catholic priest built a log chapel dedicated as a shrine to Mary Help of Christians on the summit of Holy Hill. The site attracted many pilgrims, and the log chapel was replaced with a brick church in 1881. In 1906, a group of Discalced Carmelite friars from Bavaria settled at Holy Hill and built a monastery in 1920. By 1925, the church could no longer accommodate the growing number of pilgrims, and between 1926 and 1931 two new churches were erected. Holy Hill has become one of the most visited Catholic pilgrimage sites in the Midwest, and was made a minor basilica in 2006.

For the first century of its history, the town's population remained fairly stable, but following World War II, the town grew dramatically, with the population quadrupling between 1950 and 2010. Some areas saw the development of residential subdivisions, and beginning in the 1960s some residents opposed the suburbanization of the town. However, even today most of Erin remains a rural, agricultural community.

== Geography ==
According to the United States Census Bureau, the town has a total area of 36.3 square miles (94.0 km^{2}), of which 35.9 square miles (92.9 km^{2}) is land and 0.4 square mile (1.1 km^{2}) (1.18%) is water.

== Demographics ==
As of the census of 2000, there were 3,664 people, 1,287 households, and 1,093 families residing in the town. The population density was 102.2 people per square mile (39.5/km^{2}). There were 1,352 housing units at an average density of 37.7 per square mile (14.6/km^{2}). The racial makeup of the town was 98.50% White, 0.16% African American, 0.27% Native American, 0.44% Asian, 0.16% from other races, and 0.46% from two or more races. Hispanic or Latino of any race were 0.46% of the population.

There were 1,287 households, out of which 37.3% had children under the age of 18 living with them, 78.6% were married couples living together, 4.1% had a female householder with no husband present, and 15.0% were non-families. 11.6% of all households were made up of individuals, and 3.1% had someone living alone who was 65 years of age or older. The average household size was 2.83 and the average family size was 3.09.

In the town, the population was spread out, with 26.8% under the age of 18, 5.0% from 18 to 24, 30.8% from 25 to 44, 28.5% from 45 to 64, and 9.0% who were 65 years of age or older. The median age was 39 years. For every 100 females, there were 104.7 males. For every 100 females age 18 and over, there were 104.5 males.

The median income for a household in the town was $74,875, and the median income for a family was $77,278. Males had a median income of $49,375 versus $33,889 for females. The per capita income for the town was $28,851. About 3.0% of families and 3.2% of the population were below the poverty line, including 2.6% of those under age 18 and 8.6% of those age 65 or over.

== Religion ==
The Roman Catholic shrine of Holy Hill National Shrine of Mary, Help of Christians is located within the town.

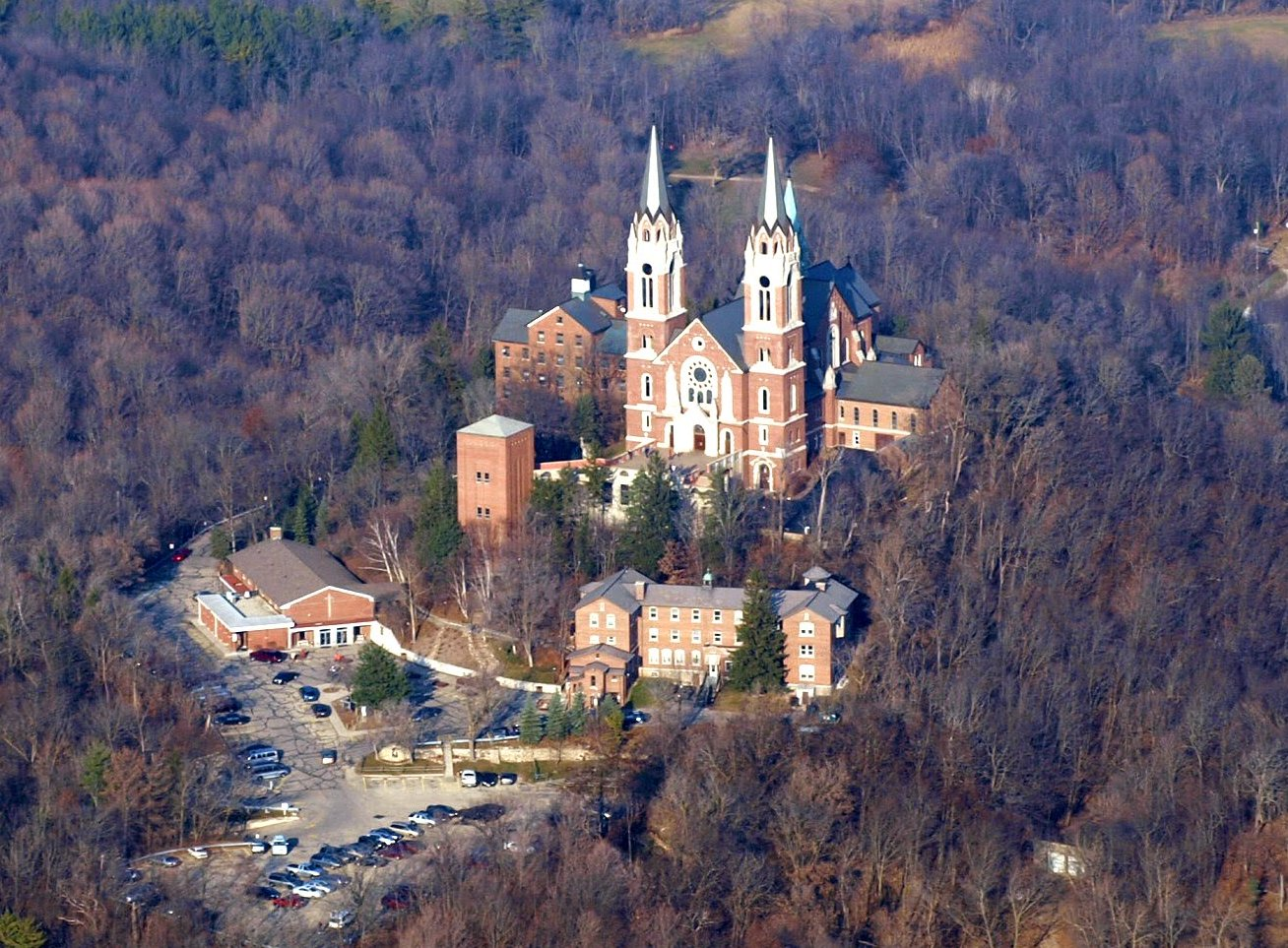
Holy Hill taken from the air

== Notable people ==
- Daniel Cavanagh, politician
- Joseph E. Russell, politician

== Images ==
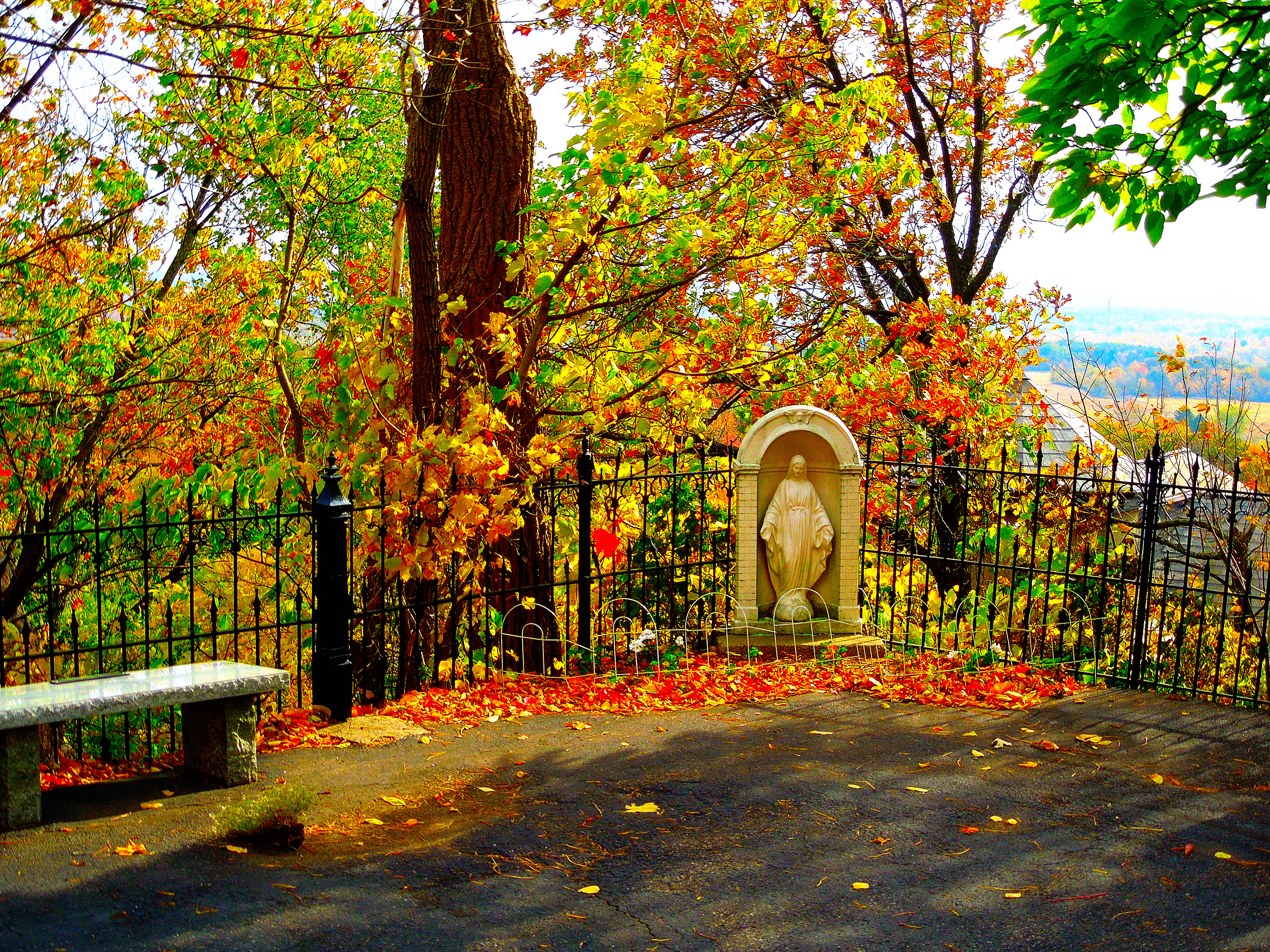
Courtyard

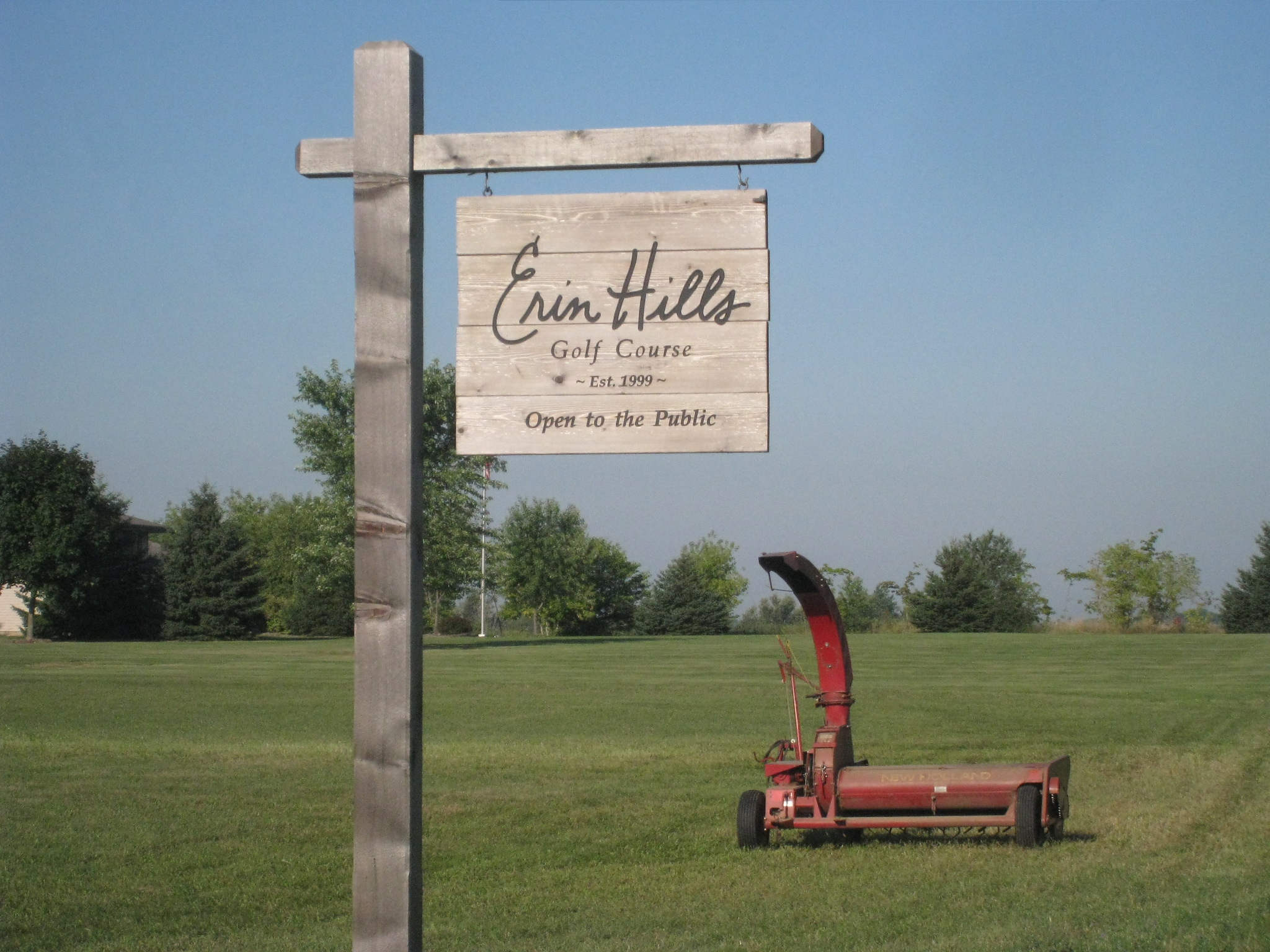
Erin Hills: a golf course
