= Jackson (village), Wisconsin =

Village in Washington County, Wisconsin

Jackson
- Village
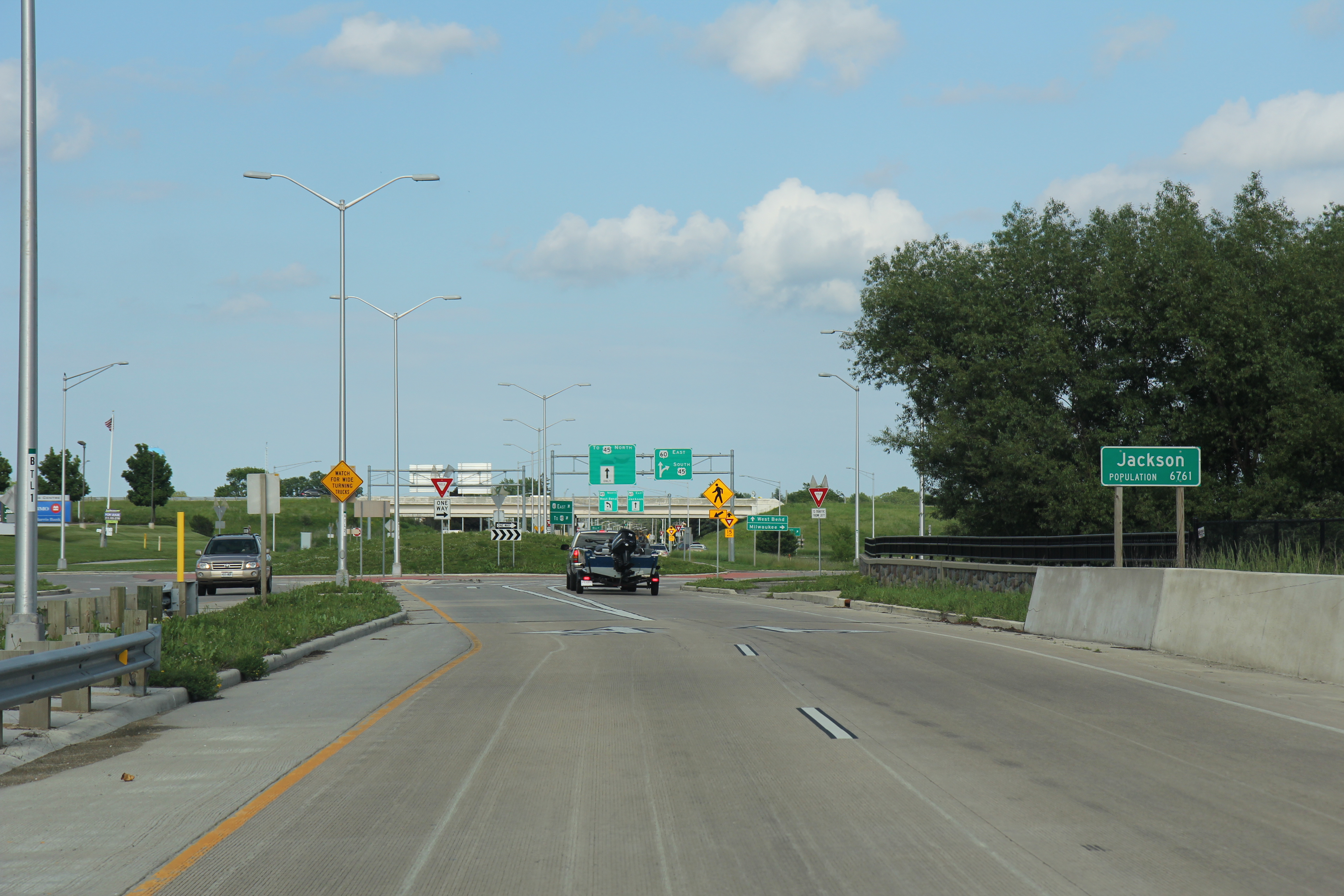
- Sign for Jackson on WIS 60

- Location of Jackson in Washington County, Wisconsin.

- Location within the state of Wisconsin
- Coordinates: 43°19′23″N 88°10′17″W
- Country: United States
- State: Wisconsin
- County: Washington
- Incorporated: March 14, 1912; 114 years ago

Government
  - Type: Village Board of Trustees
  - Village Board President: Mike Schwab

Area
  - Total: 3.40 sq mi (8.81 km^{2})
  - Land: 3.38 sq mi (8.75 km^{2})
  - Water: 0.019 sq mi (0.05 km^{2})

Population (2020)
  - Total: 7,185
  - Estimate (2023): 8,001
  - Density: 2,130/sq mi (822.5/km^{2})
- Time zone: UTC-6 (Central (CST))
  - Summer (DST): UTC-5 (CDT)
- Area code: 262
- FIPS code: 55-37675
- GNIS feature ID: 1583443
- Website: Official website

Jackson is a village in Washington County, Wisconsin, United States. The population was 7,185 at the 2020 census. The village is adjacent to the Town of Jackson.

== Geography ==
Cedar Creek, a tributary of the Milwaukee River, runs also through the southeastern part of the Village of Jackson. Hasmer Lake is located on the west side of the village, near U.S. Route 45. The 2,312-acre Jackson Marsh Wildlife Area, which is maintained by the Wisconsin Department of Natural Resources, is located in the Town of Jackson, near the village's eastern boundary.

Jackson is located at 43°19′23″N 88°10′16″W (43.323188, -88.171273). According to the United States Census Bureau, the village has a total area of 3.07 square miles (7.95 km^{2}), of which 3.05 square miles (7.90 km^{2}) is land and 0.02 square miles (0.05 km^{2}) is water.

== History ==
The first white settlers arrived in the Jackson area in 1843. The Wisconsin territorial legislature created the Town of Jackson on January 21, 1846, naming the settlement for former-president Andrew Jackson, who had died several months earlier.

The settlement that would become the Village of Jackson was originally known as Riceville, after an English misspelling of town founder Franz Reis's name. In its early years, the settlement's economy relied heavily on agricultural, and including dairy farming. Some of the earliest businesses in the community were cheese factories and creameries.

In 1872, the Chicago and North Western Railway built a line from Milwaukee to Fond du Lac with a station in Riceville. Reis capitalized on the new source of transportation by building a general store, a grain elevator, and a saloon. Other entrepreneurs followed suit, and a village began to take shape around the railway station.

Riceville incorporated as the Village of Jackson on March 14, 1912.

The village population remained between 300 and 500 people in the early to mid-20th century, before experiencing a population boom in the early 1970s. Between 1970 and 1975, the population more than tripled from 561 to 1,895. As the population continued to grow, the village annexed land from the Town of Jackson for new residential subdivisions and commercial developments. The annexations created tax losses for the town. In 1999, the town and the village created an agreement setting the village's maximum potential boundaries and outlining how the town would be compensated for future annexations. Jackson was the first community in Wisconsin to create such an agreement.

On July 17, 2012, a petroleum product pipeline spilled an estimated 54,600 gallons of gasoline in the Town of Jackson. Thirty-seven private wells contaminated by the spill were ordered abandoned by the Wisconsin Department of Natural Resources. The West Shore Pipe Line Company, which owned the pipeline, paid the costs to extend water services from the Village of Jackson to a large part of the Town of Jackson.

== Demographics ==
Historical population
Census	Pop.	Note	%±
1970	561		—
1980	1,817		223.9%
1990	2,486		36.8%
2000	4,938		98.6%
2010	6,753		36.8%
2020	7,185		6.4%
2023 (est.)	8,001		11.4%
U.S. Decennial Census

=== 2010 census ===
As of the census of 2010, there were 6,753 people, 2,870 households, and 1,866 families living in the village. The population density was 2,214.1 inhabitants per square mile (854.9/km^{2}). There were 3,061 housing units at an average density of 1,003.6 per square mile (387.5/km^{2}). The racial makeup of the village was 96.9% White, 0.5% African American, 0.2% Native American, 0.7% Asian, 0.1% Pacific Islander, 0.6% from other races, and 1.1% from two or more races. Hispanic or Latino of any race were 2.2% of the population.

There were 2,870 households, of which 31.5% had children under the age of 18 living with them, 53.4% were married couples living together, 8.0% had a female householder with no husband present, 3.6% had a male householder with no wife present, and 35.0% were non-families. 29.0% of all households were made up of individuals, and 9.5% had someone living alone who was 65 years of age or older. The average household size was 2.35 and the average family size was 2.92.

The median age in the village was 39 years. 24.3% of residents were under the age of 18; 5.6% were between the ages of 18 and 24; 30.7% were from 25 to 44; 26.9% were from 45 to 64; and 12.4% were 65 years of age or older. The gender makeup of the village was 48.7% male and 51.3% female.

=== 2000 census ===
As of the census of 2000, there were 4,938 people, 1,949 households, and 1,393 families living in the village. The population density was 1,959.5 people per square mile (756.6/km^{2}). There were 2,011 housing units at an average density of 798.0/sq mi (308.1/km^{2}). The racial makeup of the village was 98.52% White, 0.08% Black or African American, 0.24% Native American, 0.20% Asian, 0.32% from other races, and 0.63% from two or more races. 1.24% of the population were Hispanic or Latino of any race.

There were 1,949 households, out of which 36.7% had children under the age of 18 living with them, 60.4% were married couples living together, 8.2% had a female householder with no husband present, and 28.5% were non-families. 22.9% of all households were made up of individuals, and 7.8% had someone living alone who was 65 years of age or older. The average household size was 2.53, and the average family size was 3.00.

In the village, the population was spread out, with 27.4% under the age of 18, 6.2% from 18 to 24, 38.9% from 25 to 44, 18.1% from 45 to 64, and 9.5% who were 65 years of age or older. The median age was 33 years. For every 100 females, there were 99.4 males. For every 100 females age 18 and over, there were 95.6 males.

The median household income in the village was $53,990, and the median family income was $60,991. The median income for males was $41,632, and the median income for females was $26,319. The per capita income for the village was $23,450. About 3.3% of families and 4.5% of the population were below the poverty line, including 6.7% of those under age 18 and 3.3% of those age 65 or over.

== Culture ==
Jackson holds a traditional community-wide rummage sale every year. The event is held on the first Saturday after Mother's Day.

== Education ==
Most of it is in the West Bend School District. Pieces are in the Slinger School District and the Germantown School District.
