= Washington County, Wisconsin =

County in Wisconsin, United States

- County
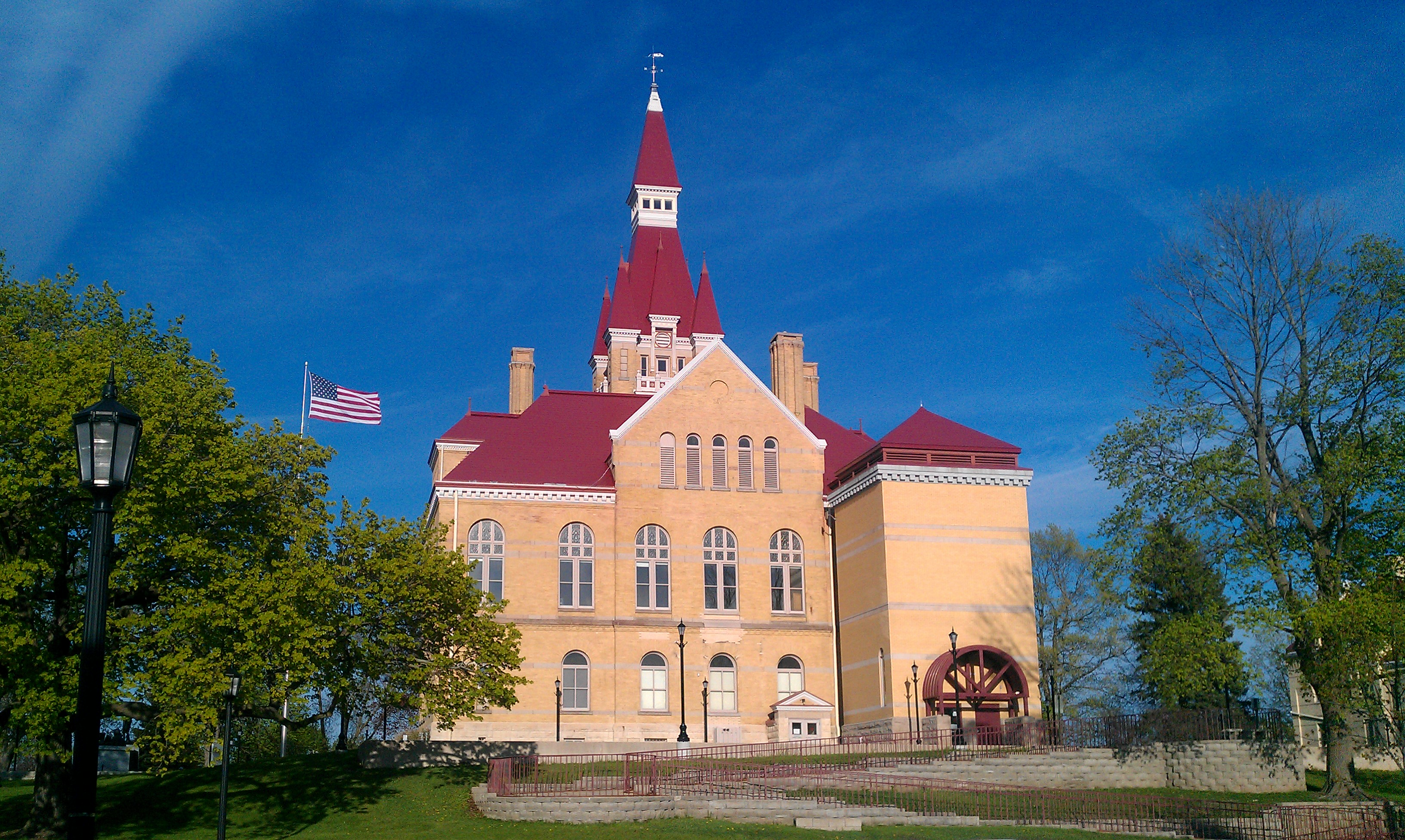
- Old Washington County Courthouse

- Location within the U.S. state of Wisconsin
- Coordinates: 43°22′N 88°14′W
- Country: United States
- State: Wisconsin
- Founded: 1836
- Named for: George Washington
- Seat: West Bend
- Largest city: West Bend

Government
  - County Executive: Josh Schoemann

Area
  - Total: 436 sq mi (1,130 km^{2})
  - Land: 431 sq mi (1,120 km^{2})
  - Water: 5.0 sq mi (13 km^{2}) 1.2%

Population (2020)
  - Total: 136,761
  - Estimate (2025): 139,238 ▲
  - Density: 317/sq mi (123/km^{2})
- Time zone: UTC−6 (Central)
  - Summer (DST): UTC−5 (CDT)
- Congressional district: 5th
- Website: www.washcowisco.gov

Washington County is a county in the U.S. state of Wisconsin. As of the 2020 census, the population was 136,761. Its county seat is West Bend. The county was created from Wisconsin Territory in 1836 and organized in 1845. It was named after President George Washington. Washington County is part of the Milwaukee metropolitan area, and part of the WOW counties.

== History ==
Washington County was created on December 7, 1836, by the Wisconsin Territory Legislature, with Port Washington designated as the county seat. It was run administratively from Milwaukee County until 1840, when an Act of Organization allowed the county self-governance, and the county seat was moved to Grafton, then called Hamburg. This solution was not satisfactory, as at that time four cities were vying to become the county seat: Port Washington, Grafton, Cedarburg, and West Bend. At least four inconclusive elections were held between 1848 and 1852, but the results were unusable due to accusations of foul play and serious irregularities.

In 1852, the state Legislature attempted to split the county into a northern and southern half, with the northern half retaining the name and the southern half becoming Tuskola County. Voters refused this decision, so in 1853 the Legislature again split the county, this time into a western and eastern portion. The western portion remained Washington County, with West Bend as its county seat, while the eastern portion became Ozaukee County, with Port Washington as its county seat.

== Geography ==
According to the U.S. Census Bureau, the county has a total area of 436 square miles (1,130 km^{2}), of which 431 square miles (1,120 km^{2}) is land and 5.0 square miles (13 km^{2}) (1.2%) is water. It is the fifth-smallest county in Wisconsin by total area.

=== Major highways ===
- Interstate 41
- U.S. Highway 41
- U.S. Highway 45
- Highway 28 (Wisconsin)
- Highway 33 (Wisconsin)
- Highway 60 (Wisconsin)
- Highway 83 (Wisconsin)
- Highway 144 (Wisconsin)
- Highway 145 (Wisconsin)
- Highway 164 (Wisconsin)
- Highway 167 (Wisconsin)
- Highway 175 (Wisconsin)

=== Railroads ===
- Canadian National
- Wisconsin and Southern Railroad

=== Buses ===
Washington County was formerly served by the Washington County Commuter Express until 2023 when the county board elected to terminate the service without replacement, as of the end of 2023 there are no public transit options linking Washington County to the rest of the Milwaukee Metro area. Limited county sponsored shared ride taxi service remains available.

=== Airports ===
Hartford Municipal Airport (KHXF) and West Bend Municipal Airport (KETB) serve the county and surrounding communities.

Erin Aero Airport also exists as a small airstrip in the Town of Erin. Some maps claim the existence Arrowhead Springs, Doering Farms Airfield, Hahn Sky Ranch, and Willow Creek Airports, but these do not exist.

Milwaukee Mitchell International Airport is the nearest commercial airport.

=== Adjacent counties ===
- Fond du Lac County - northwest
- Sheboygan County - northeast
- Ozaukee County - east
- Milwaukee County - southeast
- Waukesha County - south
- Dodge County - west

=== Protected areas ===
- Ackerman's Grove County Park
- Allenton Marsh State Wildlife Area
- Goeden County Park
- Heritage Trails County Park
- Isadore and Lorraine Spaeth County Park
- Jackson Marsh State Wildlife Area
- Kettle Moraine State Forest (part)
- Leonard J. Yahr County Park
- Lizard Mound State Park
- Pike Lake State Park
- Sandy Knoll County Park
- Theresa Marsh State Wildlife Area (part)

== Demographics ==
Historical population
Census	Pop.	Note	%±
1840	343		—
1850	19,485		5,580.8%
1860	23,622		21.2%
1870	23,919		1.3%
1880	23,442		−2.0%
1890	22,751		−2.9%
1900	23,589		3.7%
1910	23,784		0.8%
1920	25,713		8.1%
1930	26,551		3.3%
1940	28,430		7.1%
1950	33,902		19.2%
1960	46,119		36.0%
1970	63,839		38.4%
1980	84,848		32.9%
1990	95,328		12.4%
2000	117,493		23.3%
2010	131,887		12.3%
2020	136,761		3.7%
2025 (est.)	139,238	▲	1.8%
U.S. Decennial Census; 1790–1960 1900–1990; 1990–2000 2010 2020

=== Racial and ethnic composition ===
Washington County, Wisconsin – Racial and ethnic composition Note: the US Census treats Hispanic/Latino as an ethnic category. This table excludes Latinos from the racial categories and assigns them to a separate category. Hispanics/Latinos may be of any race.
Race / Ethnicity (NH = Non-Hispanic)	Pop 1980	Pop 1990	Pop 2000	Pop 2010	Pop 2020	% 1980	% 1990	% 2000	% 2010	% 2020
White alone (NH)	83,929	94,002	113,870	124,348	123,855	98.92%	98.61%	96.92%	94.28%	90.56%
Black or African American alone (NH)	65	121	447	1,115	1,672	0.08%	0.13%	0.38%	0.85%	1.22%
Native American or Alaska Native alone (NH)	146	201	275	345	272	0.17%	0.21%	0.23%	0.26%	0.20%
Asian alone (NH)	183	322	666	1,401	1,943	0.22%	0.34%	0.57%	1.06%	1.42%
Native Hawaiian or Pacific Islander alone (NH)	x	x	28	22	28	x	x	0.02%	0.02%	0.02%
Other race alone (NH)	53	12	50	51	407	0.06%	0.01%	0.04%	0.04%	0.30%
Mixed race or Multiracial (NH)	x	x	628	1,220	3,757	x	x	0.53%	0.93%	2.75%
Hispanic or Latino (any race)	472	670	1,529	3,385	4,827	0.56%	0.70%	1.30%	2.57%	3.53%
Total	84,848	95,328	117,493	131,887	136,761	100.00%	100.00%	100.00%	100.00%	100.00%

=== 2020 census ===
As of the 2020 census, the county had a population of 136,761; the population density was 317.6 people per square mile (122.6 people/km^{2}), and there were 58,311 housing units at an average density of 135.4 units per square mile (52.3 units/km^{2}).

The racial makeup of the county was 91.7% White, 1.3% Black or African American, 0.3% American Indian and Alaska Native, 1.4% Asian, <0.1% Native Hawaiian and Pacific Islander, 1.1% from some other race, and 4.2% from two or more races. Hispanic or Latino residents of any race comprised 3.5% of the population.

The median age was 43.8 years, with 21.7% of residents under the age of 18 and 19.1% who were 65 years of age or older. For every 100 females there were 98.2 males, and for every 100 females age 18 and over there were 97.2 males age 18 and over.

Of the county's residents, 61.6% lived in urban areas while 38.4% lived in rural areas.

There were 55,879 households in the county, of which 28.2% had children under the age of 18 living in them. Of all households, 56.9% were married-couple households, 15.9% were households with a male householder and no spouse or partner present, and 20.9% were households with a female householder and no spouse or partner present. About 25.8% of all households were made up of individuals and 11.8% had someone living alone who was 65 years of age or older. Of the 58,311 housing units, 4.2% were vacant. Among occupied housing units, 77.3% were owner-occupied and 22.7% were renter-occupied. The homeowner vacancy rate was 0.5% and the rental vacancy rate was 5.0%.

2000 Census Age Pyramid for Washington County

=== 2000 census ===
As of the census of 2000, there were 117,493 people, 43,842 households, and 32,749 families residing in the county. The population density was 273 people per square mile (105 people/km^{2}). There were 45,808 housing units at an average density of 106 units per square mile (41 units/km^{2}). The racial makeup of the county was 97.69% White, 0.40% Black or African American, 0.25% Native American, 0.57% Asian, 0.03% Pacific Islander, 0.40% from other races, and 0.66% from two or more races. 1.30% of the population were Hispanic or Latino of any race. 59.9% were of German, 6.3% Polish and 5.5% Irish ancestry. 95.5% spoke English, 2.0% German and 1.7% Spanish as their first language.

There were 43,842 households, out of which 36.40% had children under the age of 18 living with them, 64.20% were married couples living together, 7.20% had a female householder with no husband present, and 25.30% were non-families. 20.30% of all households were made up of individuals, and 7.60% had someone living alone who was 65 years of age or older. The average household size was 2.65 and the average family size was 3.08.

In the county, the population was spread out, with 26.70% under the age of 18, 7.20% from 18 to 24, 31.50% from 25 to 44, 23.40% from 45 to 64, and 11.20% who were 65 years of age or older. The median age was 37 years. For every 100 females there were 99.50 males. For every 100 females age 18 and over, there were 97.00 males.

== Communities ==
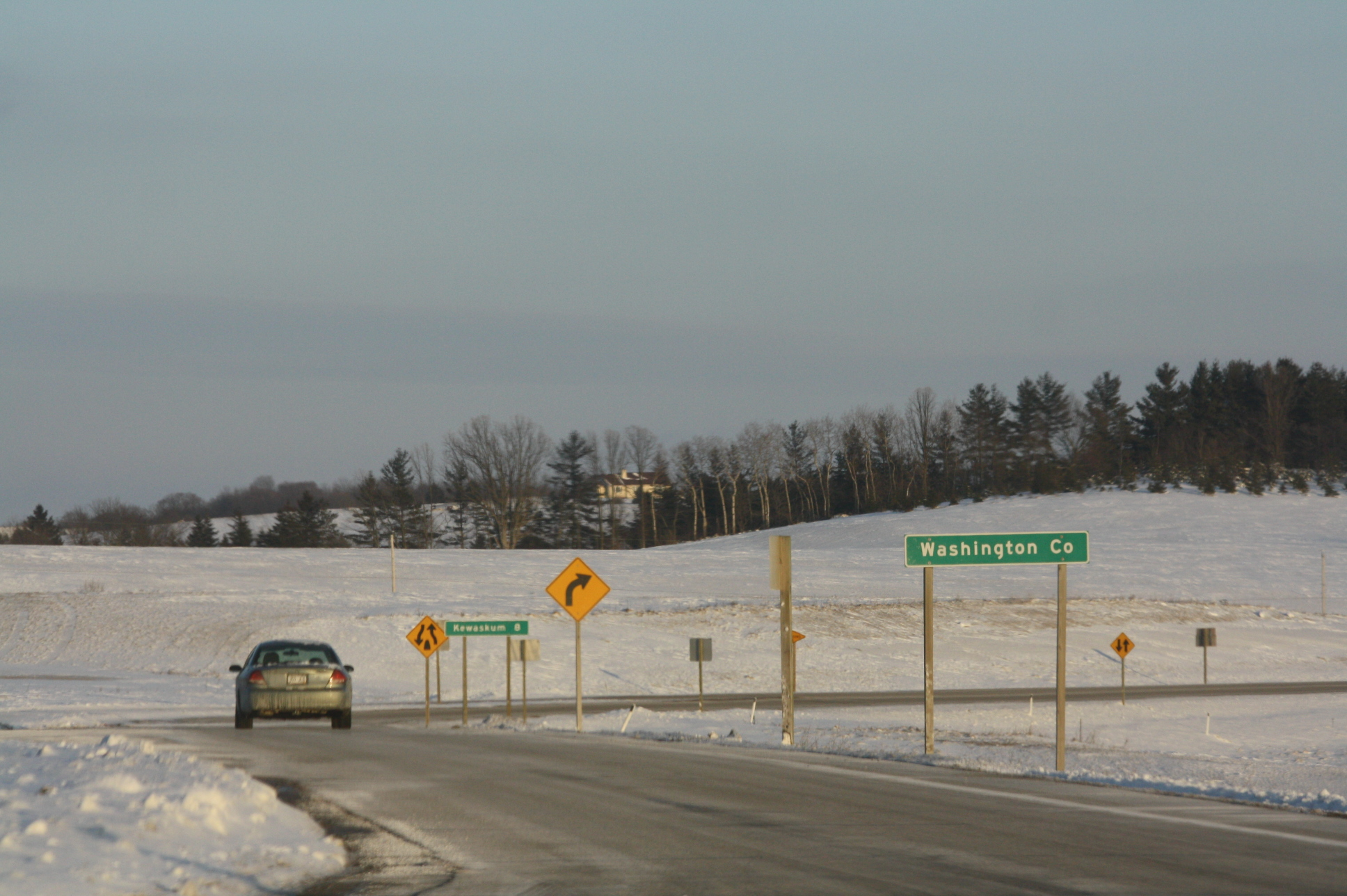
Sign on WIS 28 marking the county boundary

=== Cities ===
- Hartford (partly in Dodge County)
- Milwaukee (mostly in Milwaukee County and Waukesha County)
- West Bend (county seat)

=== Villages ===
- Germantown
- Jackson
- Kewaskum (partly in Fond du Lac County)
- Newburg (partly in Ozaukee County)
- Richfield
- Slinger

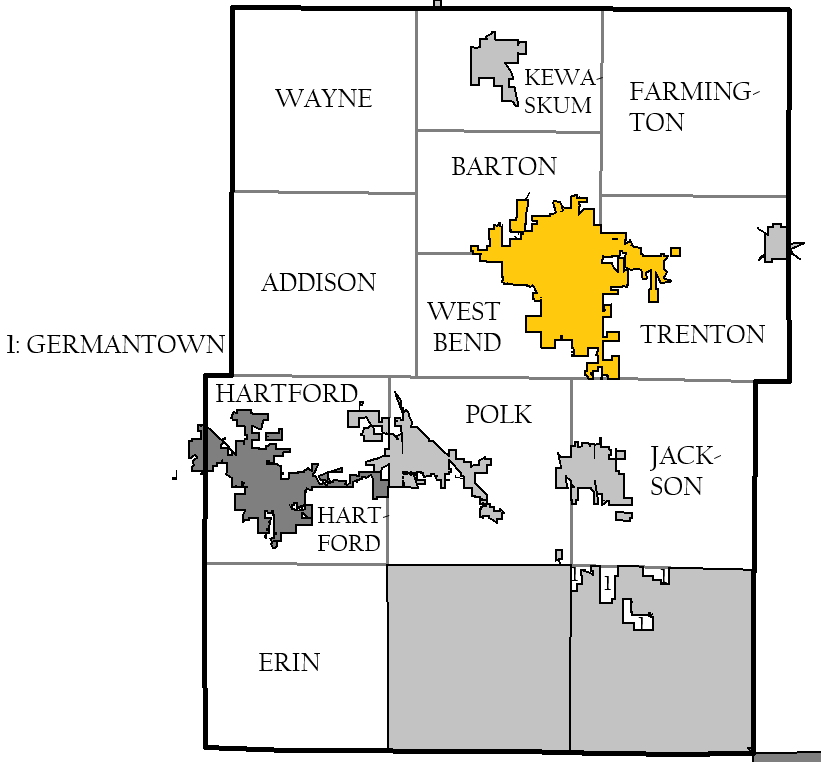
Towns of Washington County

=== Towns ===
- Addison
- Barton
- Erin
- Farmington
- Germantown
- Hartford
- Jackson
- Kewaskum
- Polk
- Trenton
- Wayne
- West Bend

=== Census-designated place ===
- Allenton

=== Unincorporated communities ===
- Ackerville
- Addison
- Aurora
- Boltonville
- Cedar Creek
- Cedar Lake
- Cheeseville
- Colgate
- Diefenbach Corners
- Fillmore
- Hubertus
- Kirchhayn
- Kohlsville
- Mayfield
- Myra
- Nenno
- Nabob
- Orchard Grove
- Pike Lake
- Pleasant Hill
- Rockfield
- Rugby Junction
- Saint Anthony
- Saint Lawrence
- Saint Michaels
- Thompson
- Toland's Prairie
- Victory Center
- Wayne
- Young America

== Education ==
K-12 school districts include:

- Cedarburg School District
- Germantown School District
- Kewaskum School District
- Random Lake School District
- Slinger School District
- West Bend School District

There is one secondary school district, Hartford Union High School District.

Elementary school districts include:

- Erin School District
- Hartford Joint No. 1 School District
- Holy Hill Area School District

High schools:

- East High School
- Germantown High School
- Hartford Union High School
- Kettle Moraine Lutheran High School
- Kewaskum High School
- Living Word Lutheran High School
- Saint Augustine School
- Slinger High School
- West High School

== Government ==
The County Executive is Josh Schoemann, a Republican who is the 1st County Executive, with the office having been established in 2020. Schoemann served as County Administrator from 2014 until 2020. In 2020, the position of County Executive was established to replace the Administrator role. While the responsibilities of the two positions are functionally identical, the primary distinction lies in the method of selection: the County Executive is an elected official, whereas the County Administrator was appointed.

== Politics ==
United States presidential election results for Washington County, Wisconsin
Year	Republican		Democratic		Third party(ies)	
Year	No.	%	No.	%	No.	%
1892	1,700	39.04%	2,624	60.27%	30	0.69%
1896	2,877	53.19%	2,404	44.44%	128	2.37%
1900	2,614	50.24%	2,524	48.51%	65	1.25%
1904	2,565	52.00%	2,243	45.47%	125	2.53%
1908	2,588	48.54%	2,625	49.23%	119	2.23%
1912	1,799	38.26%	2,425	51.57%	478	10.17%
1916	2,892	50.30%	2,732	47.52%	125	2.17%
1920	5,949	76.78%	1,328	17.14%	471	6.08%
1924	1,987	24.44%	980	12.05%	5,164	63.51%
1928	4,163	41.13%	5,827	57.57%	132	1.30%
1932	2,209	20.11%	8,570	78.02%	206	1.88%
1936	3,589	29.68%	7,129	58.96%	1,374	11.36%
1940	8,501	63.54%	4,683	35.00%	196	1.46%
1944	8,921	69.44%	3,840	29.89%	86	0.67%
1948	6,876	59.46%	4,495	38.87%	194	1.68%
1952	12,626	73.84%	4,440	25.96%	34	0.20%
1956	12,167	72.93%	4,447	26.66%	69	0.41%
1960	11,452	57.29%	8,523	42.63%	16	0.08%
1964	9,191	44.21%	11,563	55.62%	37	0.18%
1968	12,439	54.96%	8,104	35.81%	2,088	9.23%
1972	15,338	56.81%	10,434	38.64%	1,229	4.55%
1976	18,798	55.17%	14,422	42.33%	850	2.49%
1980	23,213	58.81%	12,944	32.79%	3,314	8.40%
1984	25,279	65.54%	12,966	33.61%	328	0.85%
1988	24,328	60.01%	15,907	39.24%	304	0.75%
1992	22,739	45.41%	13,339	26.64%	13,995	27.95%
1996	25,829	52.96%	17,154	35.18%	5,784	11.86%
2000	41,162	67.03%	18,115	29.50%	2,135	3.48%
2004	50,641	69.88%	21,234	29.30%	592	0.82%
2008	47,729	64.14%	25,719	34.56%	963	1.29%
2012	54,765	69.55%	23,166	29.42%	811	1.03%
2016	51,740	67.41%	20,852	27.17%	4,165	5.43%
2020	60,237	68.40%	26,650	30.26%	1,183	1.34%
2024	61,604	67.40%	28,504	31.18%	1,299	1.42%

Like most other suburban counties surrounding Milwaukee (the "WOW counties"), Washington County is a Republican stronghold. Since 1940, the county has been won by the Republican presidential candidate in every election except 1964, as is the case in neighboring Ozaukee and Waukesha counties. Additionally, John F. Kennedy, Lyndon Johnson and Jimmy Carter are the only Democratic presidential candidates since the 1936 election to have crossed the 40 percent mark. In 2008, while Barack Obama won Wisconsin by 14 points, Washington County, one of the 13 out of 72 counties to vote for his Republican rival John McCain was his weakest county in the state, as McCain won it by almost 30 points; and other WOW counties were the only three counties where Obama did not win 40 percent of the vote.

== See also ==
- National Register of Historic Places listings in Washington County, Wisconsin
