= Hartford (town), Wisconsin =

Town in Washington County, Wisconsin

Coordinates: 43.31778°N 88.37899°W

Hartford, Wisconsin
- Town
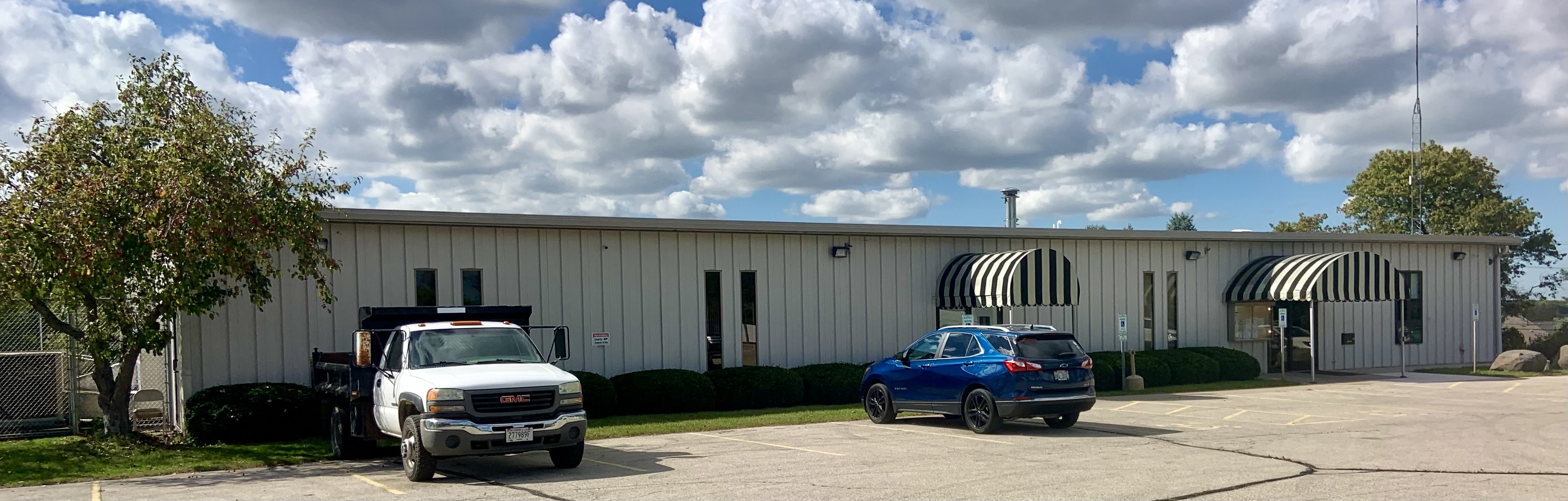
- Hartford Town Hall
- Etymology: Hartford, Connecticut
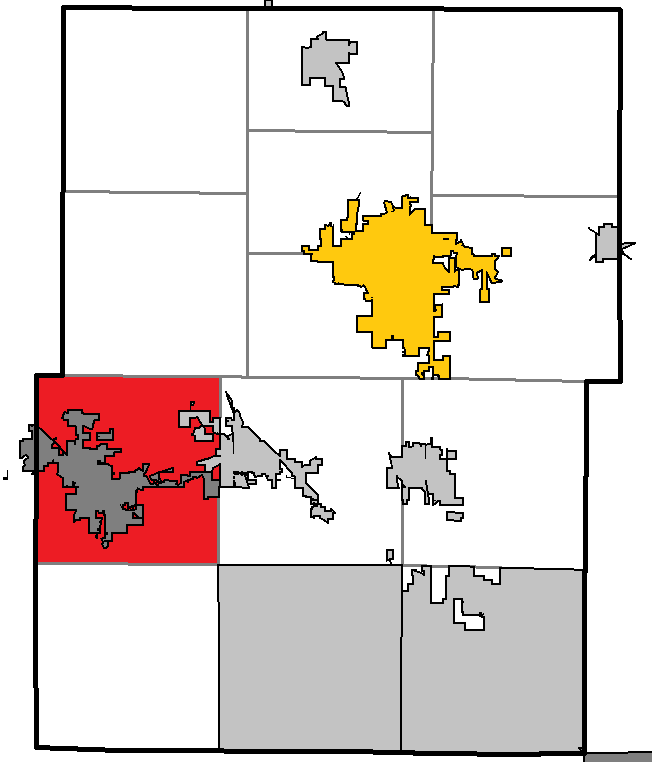
- Location of Hartford, within Washington County
- Country: United States
- State: Wisconsin
- County: Washington
- Incorporated: January 31st 1846 (as Wright)
- Renamed: February 1847 (as Hartford)

Government
  - Town Board Chair: Ryan Lippert

Area
  - Total: 30.9 sq mi (80 km^{2})
  - Land: 30.2 sq mi (78 km^{2})
  - Water: 0.7 sq mi (1.8 km^{2}) 2.36%

Population (2020)
  - Total: 3,400
  - Density: 110/sq mi (43/km^{2})
- Time zone: UTC-6 (Central (CST))
  - Summer (DST): UTC-5 (CDT)
- Area code: 262
- Website: https://townofhartfordwi.gov/

Hartford is a town in Washington County, Wisconsin, United States. A portion of the city of Hartford within Washington County is located adjacent to the town, but the two are politically independent. The population of the town was 3,400 at the 2020 census. The unincorporated community of Pike Lake is located in the town. The unincorporated community of Saint Lawrence is also located partially in the town.

== History ==
In the early 19th century, Hartford was inhabited by the Potawatomi and Menominee people, who had a trading post on the Rubicon River and a village on the eastern shore of Pike Lake. In 1831, the Menominee surrendered their claims to the land to the United States Federal Government through the Treaty of Washington, and the Potawatomi surrendered their land claims in 1833 through the 1833 Treaty of Chicago, which (after being ratified in 1835) required them to leave the area by 1838. However, when the first white settlers arrived in 1843, they found that the Potawatomi were still living at the Pike Lake village. Some Native Americans remained in the area and were referred to as "strolling Potawatomi" in contemporary documents because many of them were migrants who subsisted by squatting on their ancestral lands, which were now owned by white settlers. Eventually the Native people who evaded forced removal gathered in northern Wisconsin, where they formed the Forest County Potawatomi Community.

In July 1843, Timothy Hall became the first white person to purchase and settle land in the Hartford area, although when he arrived he found a Canadian named Jehial Case squatting near his land. Later that year, German immigrant settlers John Theil and Nicolaus Simon surveyed the Hartford area and determined that the Rubicon River would be a suitable location for a hydropowered mill. The following year, James and George Rossman joined Simon and Theil's venture. The men purchased forty acres abutting the rapids of the Rubicon River in what would become the City of Hartford and constructed a dam and a sawmill that harnessed the river's power to make lumber from the old-growth forests covering the area. In 1846, a third Rossman brother, Charles, arrived in Hartford and constructed a gristmill to process grain grown by the settlers. On January 31, 1846, the land incorporated as the Town of Wright, before the name was changed to the Town of Hartford in February 1847, after Hartford, Connecticut. The early settlers cleared land for farming; constructed roads; created a post office; erected churches, the first being the First Congregational Church of Hartford which formed in 1847, and was followed by Methodist, Baptist, Lutheran, and Catholic churches in the 1850s; and established businesses to serve the town's agricultural economy, including equipment wholesalers, general stores, and dry goods dealers.

The La Crosse and Milwaukee Railroad was constructed through the community in 1855, and while rail connections were important to Hartford's growth into the early 1900s, the company failed in 1861. Many local landowners had taken out mortgages on land for the railroad in exchange for company shares. The company's failure left the landowners with mortgages to pay off, creating a local crisis in which some families were forced to sell their farms. The Hartford Home League newspaper started during the crisis to advocate for the farmers.

The community's early years saw increasing tension between the white settlers and their Native American neighbors. For example, on August 25, 1861, a group of approximately a dozen Native Americans were living near Horicon Marsh, northwest of Hartford. They owned a horse, which got loose and wandered into a neighboring settler's cornfield. The settler shot and killed the horse, and the Native Americans vowed revenge. The story traveled quickly, becoming increasingly exaggerated as it spread. By the time the story reached Hartford on August 26, the dozen peaceful Native Americans had been transfigured into an army of 5,000 warriors preparing to massacre the settlers in the area. Many able-bodied men in Hartford armed themselves, formed a war party, and set out to fight the Native Americans. But when they arrived at Horicon Marsh they found that the threat was entirely fictional. The incident caused widespread fear among the Native Americans as well as in the surrounding communities.

The City of Hartford incorporated out of some of the town's land in 1883, and shifted from being a small market town serving the local farmers to being a larger industrial community, including the Kissel Motor Car Company; the International Stamping Company, which manufactured automobile parts; the Hartford Canning Company, which process local farmers' crops—particularly peas, which were a cash crop in the area; the knitting mills of the Paramount Knitting Company; a glove factory; three tanneries; and a brewery.

During World War II, the Town of Hartford's farmers were affected by labor shortages, and in the summer of 1944, the U.S. military tried to remedy the problem by contracting German prisoners of war to work on pea farms. Initially, the prisoners were transported from a requisitioned hotel on Lake Keesus in Waukesha County. In October 1944, the military requisitioned the Schwartz Ballroom in the City of Hartford to serve as a prisoner of war camp for 600 Germans. The prisoners were contracted to work on farms as well as in canneries, hemp mills, dairy facilities, and tanneries. The camp closed in January 1946 and the prisoners were repatriated to Germany.

== Geography ==
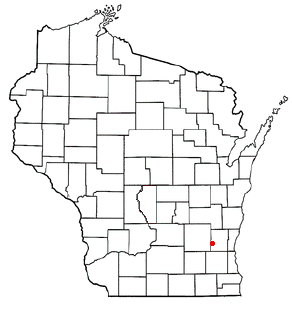
Location of Hartford, Washington County, Wisconsin, Wisconsin

According to the United States Census Bureau, the town has a total area of 30.9 mi^{2} (80.1 km^{2}), of which 30.2 mi^{2} (78.2 km^{2}) is land and 0.7 mi^{2} (1.9 km^{2}) (2.36%) is water.

== Demographics ==
As of the census of 2000, there were 4,031 people, 1,397 households, and 1,152 families residing in the town. The population density was 133.6 people per square mile (51.6/km^{2}). There were 1,438 housing units at an average density of 47.6/mi^{2} (18.4/km^{2}). The racial makeup of the town was 98.88% White, 0.20% African American, 0.10% Native American, 0.37% Asian, 0.15% from other races, and 0.30% from two or more races. Hispanic or Latino of any race were 0.55% of the population.

There were 1,397 households, out of which 40.6% had children under the age of 18 living with them, 74.7% were married couples living together, 4.0% had a female householder with no husband present, and 17.5% were non-families. 14.5% of all households were made up of individuals, and 4.2% had someone living alone who was 65 years of age or older. The average household size was 2.88 and the average family size was 3.19.

In the town, the population was spread out, with 28.0% under the age of 18, 6.0% from 18 to 24, 31.8% from 25 to 44, 25.8% from 45 to 64, and 8.4% who were 65 years of age or older. The median age was 38 years. For every 100 females, there were 102.6 males. For every 100 females age 18 and over, there were 107.1 males.

The median income for a household in the town was $69,896, and the median income for a family was $73,576. Males had a median income of $42,301 versus $29,727 for females. The per capita income for the town was $26,928. About 1.1% of families and 1.9% of the population were below the poverty line, including 4.5% of those under the age of 18 and 0.7% of those ages 65 and older.

== Sources ==
- Quickert, Carl (1912). Washington County, Wisconsin: Past and Present. Chicago, IL: S. J. Clarke Publishing Company.
