= Nutone =

Nutone may refer to:

- Nutone Records, a Canadian record label
- Nu:Tone, an English drum and bass musician
- NuTone, an American manufacturer of residential electric and electronic products
- Number unobtainable tone (also known as NU tone), a telephony signal
