= Aronoff Center =

Performing arts center in Ohio, USA

Aronoff Center for the Arts

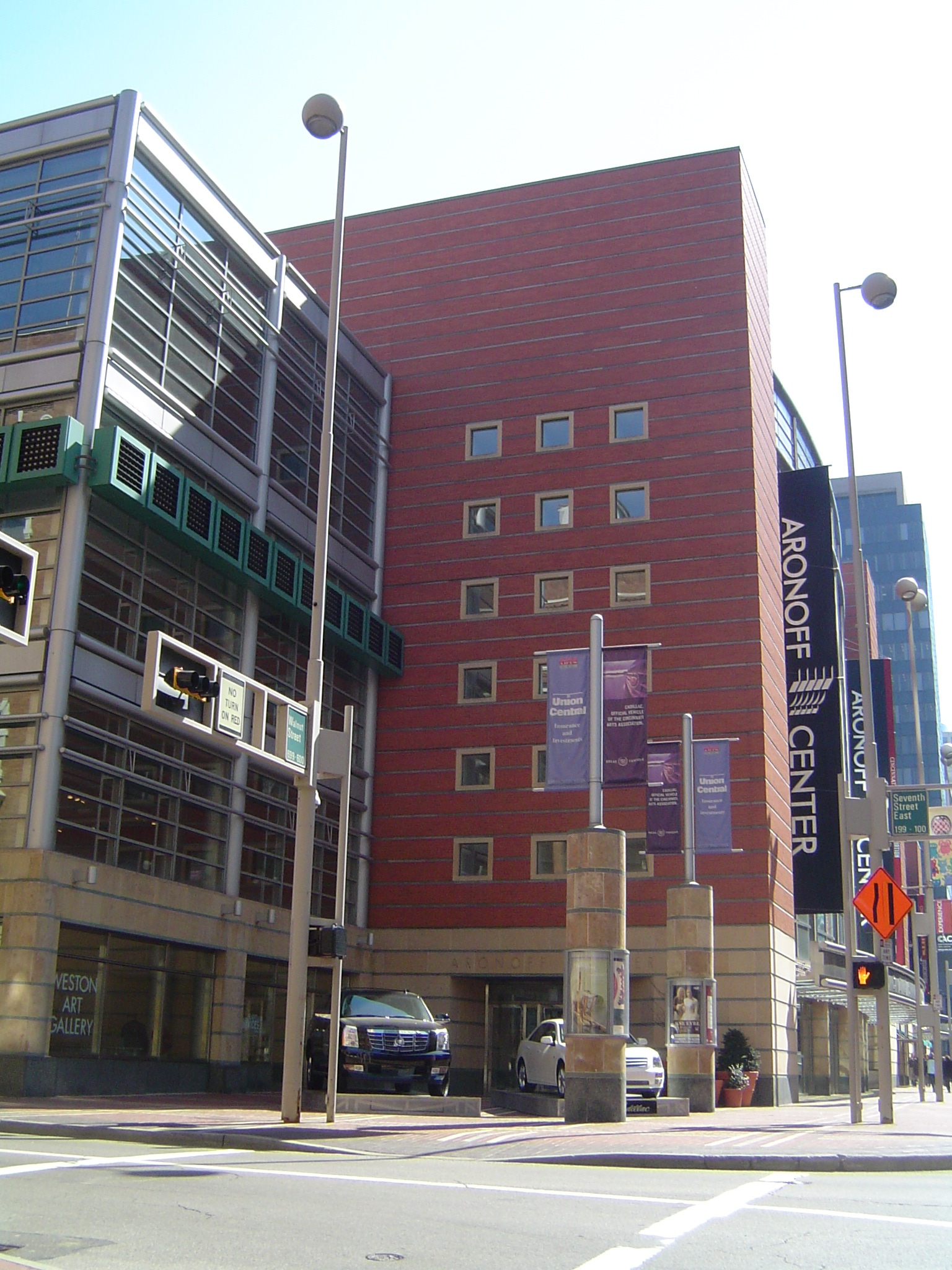
- Front facade
- Interactive map of Aronoff Center for the Arts
- Address: 650 Walnut Street; Cincinnati, Ohio; United States
- Coordinates: 39.103556°N 84.511774°W
- Owner: Cincinnati Arts Association
- Capacity: 2,719 (Procter & Gamble Hall); 437 (Jarson-Kaplan Theater); 150 (Fifth Third Bank Theater); 3,306 (total)
- Type: Fine arts performing center
- Public transit: Connector

Construction
- Opened: 1995
- Years active: 1995–present
- Architect: César Pelli

Tenant
- Broadway Across America

Website
- http://www.cincinnatiarts.org/aronoff

The Aronoff Center is a large performing arts center in downtown Cincinnati, Ohio. The Aronoff Center hosts plays, ballet, popular music concerts, stand-up comedy shows, and musicals. The center was designed by architect César Pelli and named in honor of Cincinnati native and Ohio senator Stanley Aronoff.

== History ==
The Aronoff Center was proposed in 1993; at the time of the proposal, some community members voiced concerns that a new concert venue would lead to the abandonment or destruction of Cincinnati Music Hall. Opponents included Patricia Corbett, wife of J. Ralph Corbett and Louise Nippert, who were large supporters of the arts in Cincinnati. At the time, Cincinnati lacked a modern music venue in downtown, with the nearby Taft Theater lacking air conditioning, preventing shows during the summer. Corbett later supported the center after meeting with the theater's committee, but Nippert remained opposed.

Then President of the Ohio Senate, Stanley Aronoff, secured $40 million of funding for the project, which was originally set aside for an unrealized Broadway theater in Columbus, proposed by Les Wexner. The Aronoff Center was named in his honor.

The Cincinnati Arts Association was formed in 1992, and oversees both Music Hall and the Aronoff Center.

The center officially opened on October 21, 1995, with an opening gala that drew 60,000 visitors in the first week.

In November 1995, the Aronoff saw its first Broadway show, with a performance of Miss Saigon. The show ran for 48 performances and was seen by over 100,000 visitors.

In July 2012, the Aronoff hosted the World Choir Games, which drew nearly 30,000.

During the summers of 2016 and 2017, the Cincinnati Opera played at the Aronoff due to the renovation of Music Hall.

The Aronoff Center has subsequently been characterized as catalyzing development in downtown Cincinnati

== Facilities ==
Performance facilities:

- Procter & Gamble Hall, the Aronoff Center's largest theater seating 2,719
- Jarson-Kaplan Theater, a mid-size theater seating 437
- Fifth Third Bank Theater, a studio theater which seats up to 150

Additional event areas:

- The Alice F. and Harris K. Weston Art Gallery, a 3,500-square-foot (330 m^{2}) art gallery
- Center Stage Room and The Green Room, used for receptions, dinners, and screenings

== See also ==
- List of concert halls
