= Zivko's Ballroom =

Historic building and former music venue jn Hartford, Wisconsin

Coordinates: 43.310101°N 88.377097°W

Chandelier Ballroom
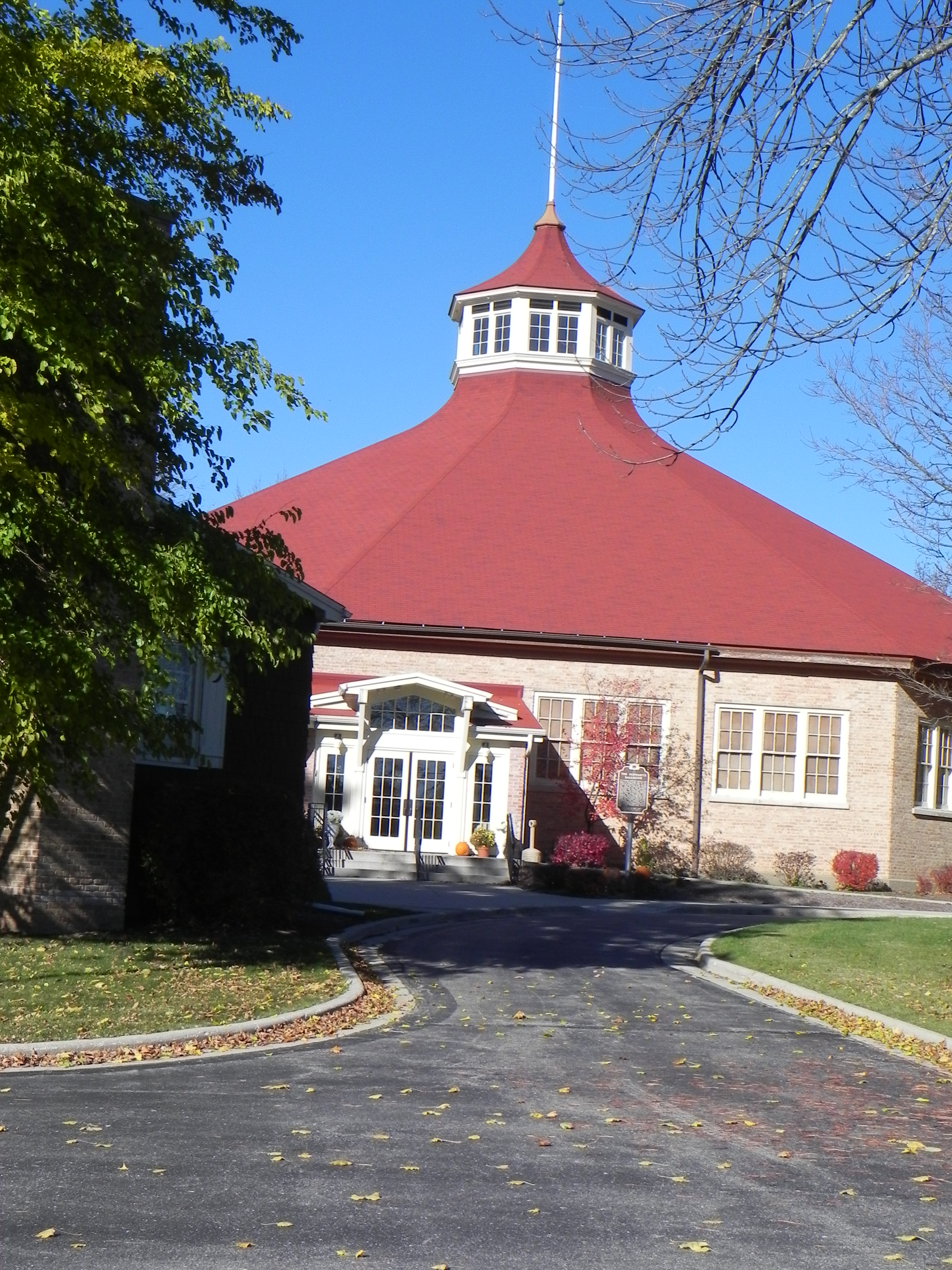
- The building in 2014
- Location: Hartford, Wisconsin, United States
- Type: Music venue, wedding venue
- Opened: 1928

Zivko's Ballroom was a music venue located in Hartford, Wisconsin. The Art Deco ballroom was built in 1928, although it was not until 1949 that it became Zivko's Ballroom, after being purchased by businessman Marty Zivko. Some of the artists that performed at Zivko's include Duke Ellington, Louis Armstrong, Joe Walsh, Robin Trower, Ted Nugent, Cheap Trick, Ricky Nelson and Chubby Checker. Today, the building, now known as the Chandelier Ballroom, is used mainly for wedding receptions.
