= Hartford, Wisconsin =

City in Washington County, Wisconsin

- City
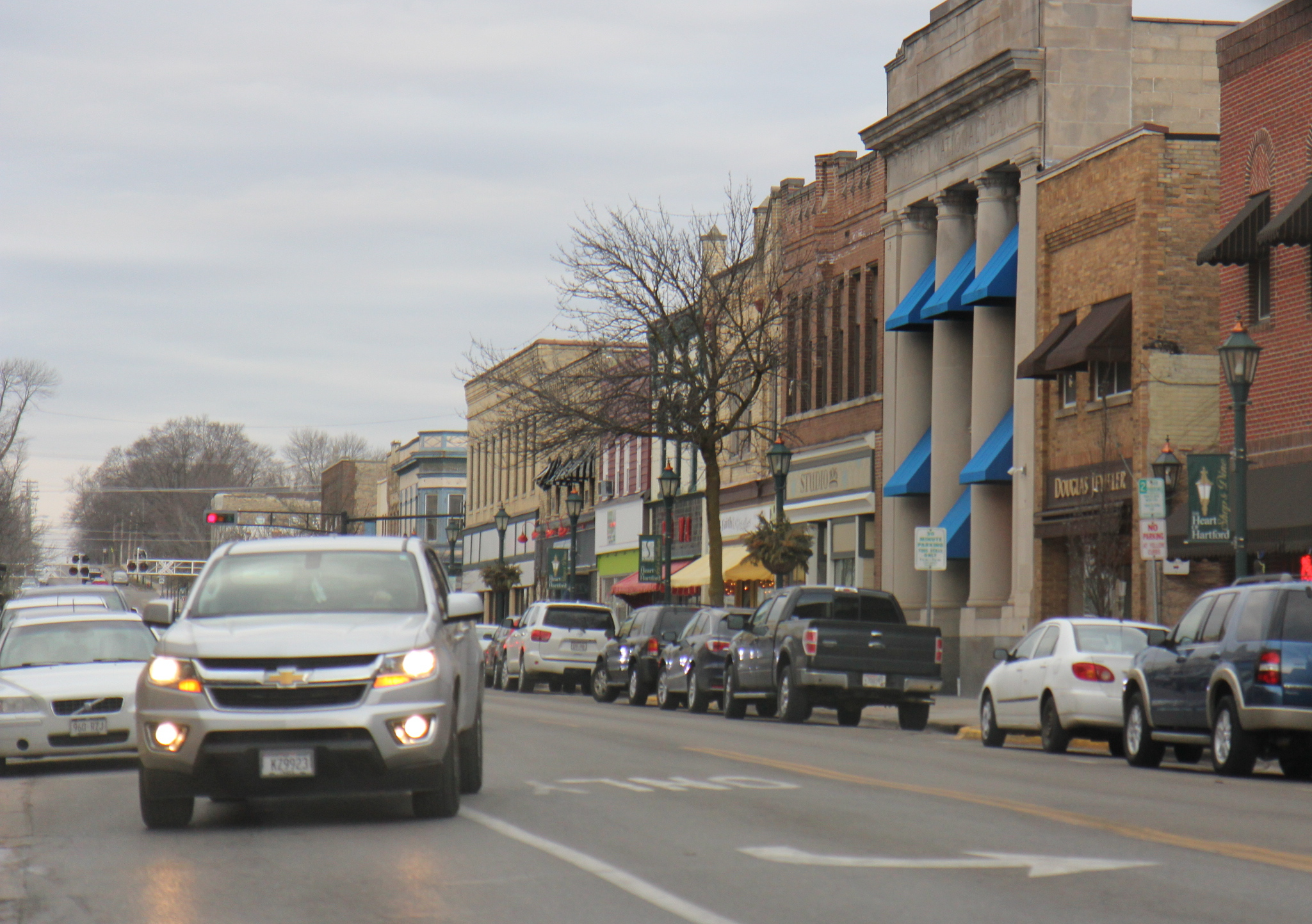
- Downtown Hartford on WIS 83

- Location of Hartford in Washington (east) and Dodge (west) counties, Wisconsin

- Location within Wisconsin Location within the United States
- Coordinates: 43°19′6″N 88°22′44″W
- Country: United States
- State: Wisconsin
- Counties: Washington, Dodge

Area
  - Total: 8.51 sq mi (22.04 km^{2})
  - Land: 8.43 sq mi (21.83 km^{2})
  - Water: 0.081 sq mi (0.21 km^{2})
- Elevation: 981 ft (299 m)

Population (2020)
  - Total: 15,626
  - Estimate (2019): 15,445
  - Density: 1,832.6/sq mi (707.57/km^{2})
- Time zone: UTC-6 (Central (CST))
  - Summer (DST): UTC-5 (CDT)
- ZIP Codes: 53027, 53078, 53086
- Area code: 262
- FIPS code: 55-33000
- GNIS feature ID: 1566104
- Website: www.ci.hartford.wi.us

Hartford is a city in Washington and Dodge counties in the U.S. state of Wisconsin. As of the 2020 census, the city had a population of 16,000. All of this population resided in Washington County; the portion of the city in Dodge County consists of only industrial and commercial parcels. Located approximately 38 miles (61 km) northwest of downtown Milwaukee and 22 miles (35 km) from city limits, Hartford is located on the outer edge of the Milwaukee metropolitan area.

== History ==
=== Early history and settlement ===
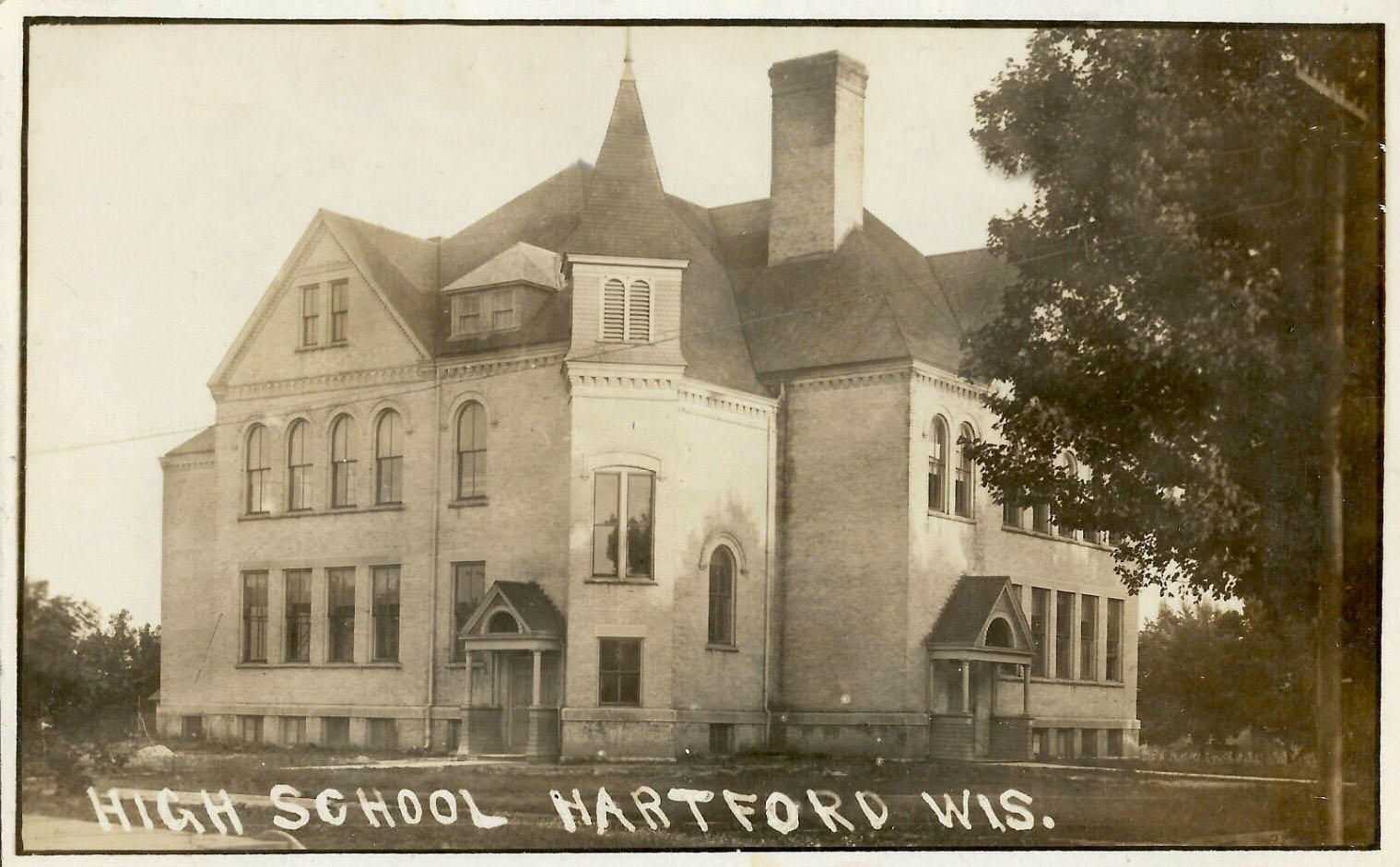
1911 Hartford, Wisconsin High School

In the early 19th century, Hartford was inhabited by the Potawatomi and Menominee people, who had a trading post on the Rubicon River and a village on the eastern shore of Pike Lake. In 1831, the Menominee surrendered their claims to the land to the United States Federal Government through the Treaty of Washington, and the Potawatomi surrendered their land claims in 1833 through the 1833 Treaty of Chicago, which (after being ratified in 1835) required them to leave the area by 1838. However, when the first White settlers arrived in 1843, they found that the Potawatomi were still living at the Pike Lake village. Some Native Americans remained in the area and were referred to as "strolling Potawatomi" in contemporary documents because many of them were migrants who subsisted by squatting on their ancestral lands, which were now owned by White settlers. Eventually the Potawatomi who evaded forced removal gathered in northern Wisconsin, where they formed the Forest County Potawatomi Community.

In July 1843, Timothy Hall became the first White person to purchase and settle land in the Hartford area, although when he arrived he found a Canadian named Jehial Case squatting near his land. Later that year, German immigrant settlers John Thiel and Nicolaus Simon surveyed the Hartford area and determined that the Rubicon River would be a suitable location for a hydropowered mill. The following year, James and George Rossman joined Simon and Thiel's venture. The men purchased forty acres abutting the rapids of the Rubicon River and constructed a dam and a sawmill that harnessed the river's power to make lumber from the old-growth forests covering the area. In 1846, a third Rossman brother, Charles, arrived in Hartford and constructed a gristmill to process grain grown by the settlers. On January 31, 1846, the land was incorporated as the Town of Wright, before the name was changed to the Town of Hartford in February 1847, after Hartford, Connecticut. Many of the original settlers were Yankees from New England and were part of a wave of farmers who headed west in the early 1800s, though some other settlers—including Theil and Simon—were German immigrants. The early settlers cleared land for farming; constructed roads; created a post office; erected churches, starting with the First Congregational Church of Hartford which formed in 1847 and followed by Methodist, Baptist, Lutheran, and Catholic churches in the 1850s; and established businesses to serve the town's agricultural economy, including equipment wholesalers, general stores, and dry goods dealers.

The La Crosse and Milwaukee Railroad was constructed through the community in 1855, with Louis Thiel, son of surveyor John Thiel, being a gatekeeper at the St. Paul railroad. And while rail connections were important to Hartford's growth into the early 1900s, the company failed in 1861. Many local landowners had taken out mortgages on land for the railroad in exchange for company shares. The company's failure left the landowners with mortgages to pay off, creating a local crisis in which some families were forced to sell their farms. The Hartford Home League newspaper started during the crisis to advocate for the farmers.

The community's early years saw increasing tension between the settlers and Native Americans. For example, on August 25, 1861, a group of approximately a dozen Native Americans was living near Horicon Marsh, northwest of Hartford. They owned a horse, which got loose and wandered into a neighboring settler's cornfield. The settler shot and killed the horse, and the Native Americans vowed to take revenge. The story traveled quickly, becoming increasingly exaggerated as it spread. By the time the story reached Hartford on August 26, the dozen peaceful Native Americans had been transfigured into an army of 5,000 warriors preparing to massacre the settlers in the area. Many able-bodied men in Hartford armed themselves, formed a war party, and set out to fight the Native Americans. But when they arrived at Horicon Marsh they found that the threat was entirely fictional. The incident caused widespread fear among the local Native American community as well as in the surrounding settler communities.

=== Growth and industrialization ===
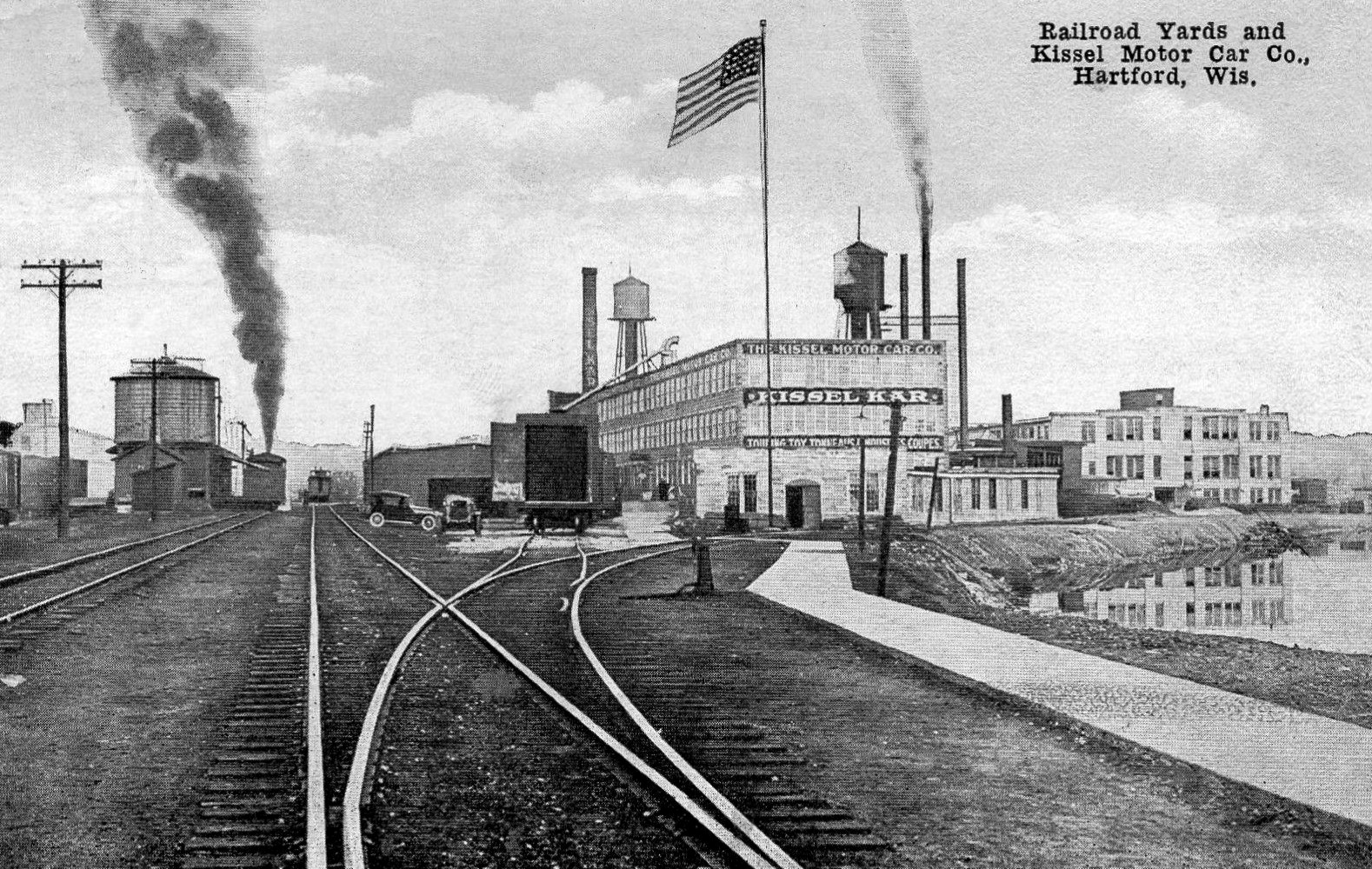
The Kissel Motor Car Company factory in 1921

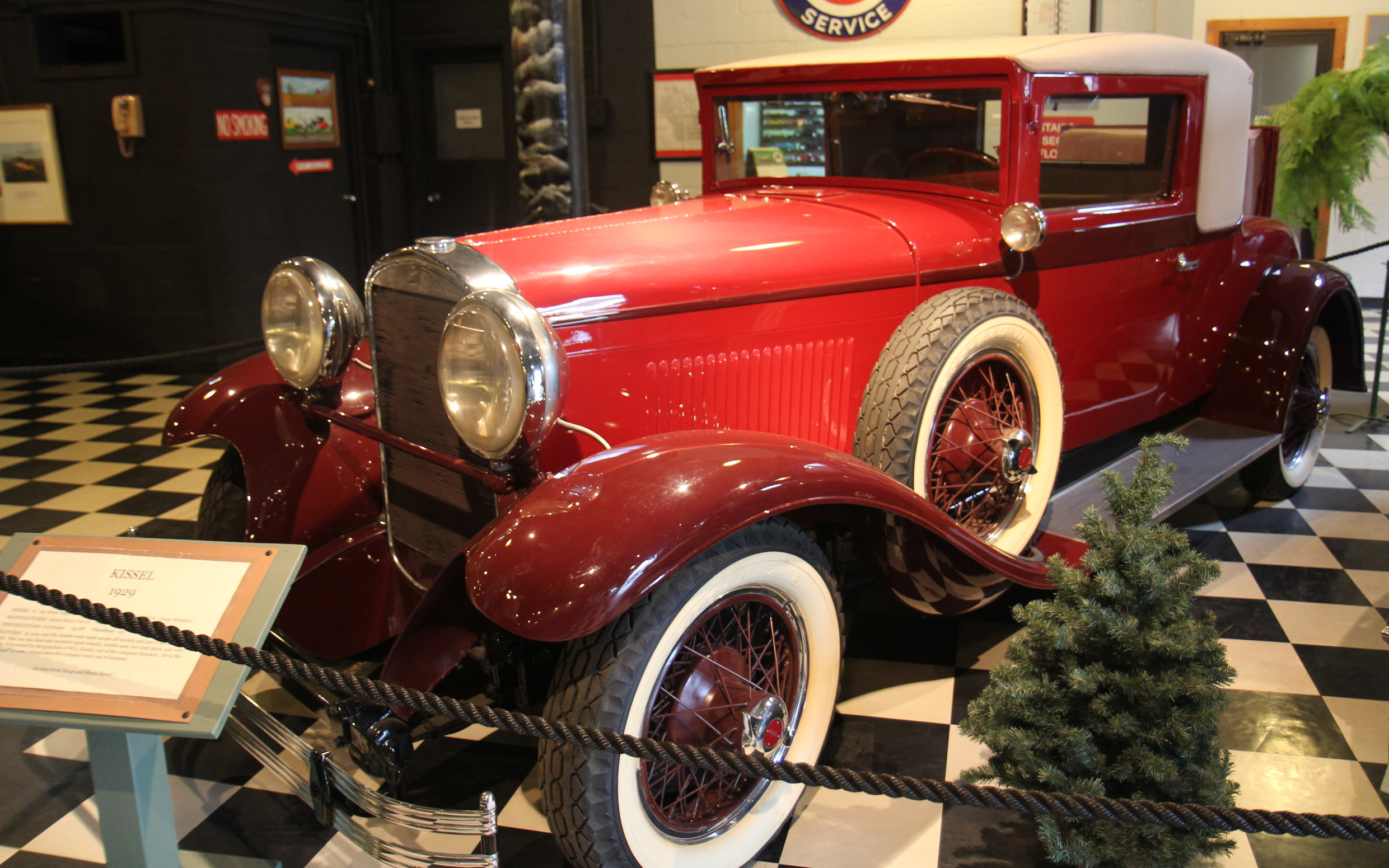
A 1929 Kissel 8-95 White Eagle made in Hartford, Wisconsin. The Wisconsin Automotive Museum in Hartford owns a large collection of Kissels and other automobiles manufactured in the state.

Hartford incorporated as a city in 1883. While Hartford had a large German-American population in the 19th century and was home to several German cultural associations, including the Hartford Turners, the Hartford Schützenverein, and a chapter of the Sons of Hermann, the Germans in Hartford tended to be more assimilated than Germans in other Washington County communities. In 1912, one historian observed that in Washington County "there have always been places where the American [culture] predominated. Take the example of the two cities in the county. Hartford always was more of an American community than West Bend."

In the final decades of the 1800s and first years of the 1900s, Hartford's economy shifted from being a small market town serving the local farmers to being a larger industrial community. In 1906, the Kissel Motor Car Company opened and quickly became the community's largest employer, creating hundreds of jobs and bringing European immigrant laborers into the community. Hartford was also home to the International Stamping Company, which manufactured automobile parts; the Hartford Canning Company, which processed local farmers' crops such as peas, which were a cash crop in the area; the knitting mills of the Paramount Knitting Company; a glove factory; three tanneries, and a brewery.

During World War II, Hartford's factories contributed to the war effort. The Kissel car factory, which was sold to the West Bend Aluminum Company in 1944, was retooled to make shell casings, rocket containers, affordable kitchenware and canisters for gas masks. The Hartford Canning Company produced military rations. In the summer of 1944, the U.S. military tried to fill labor shortages in the Hartford area by contracting German prisoners of war to work on pea farms. Initially, the prisoners were transported from a requisitioned hotel on Lake Keesus in Waukesha County. In October 1944, the military requisitioned the Schwartz Ballroom on Jefferson Street (operating as the "Chandelier Ballroom" as of 2020) to serve as a prisoner of war camp for 600 Germans. The prisoners were contracted to work on farms as well as in canneries, hemp mills, dairy facilities and tanneries. The camp closed in January 1946 and the prisoners were repatriated to Germany.

Hartford's population grew during the post–World War II economic expansion. The population more than doubled between 1950 and 1960, and the community has continued to grow in subsequent decades. While many of the early 20th century manufacturers, including the Kissel Motor Car Company, have closed, Hartford is home to several large manufacturers, including Broan-NuTone, which manufactures ventilation systems. In 1990, the city annexed land from the neighboring Town of Rubicon in Dodge County to expand its industrial zone.

=== Historic landmarks ===
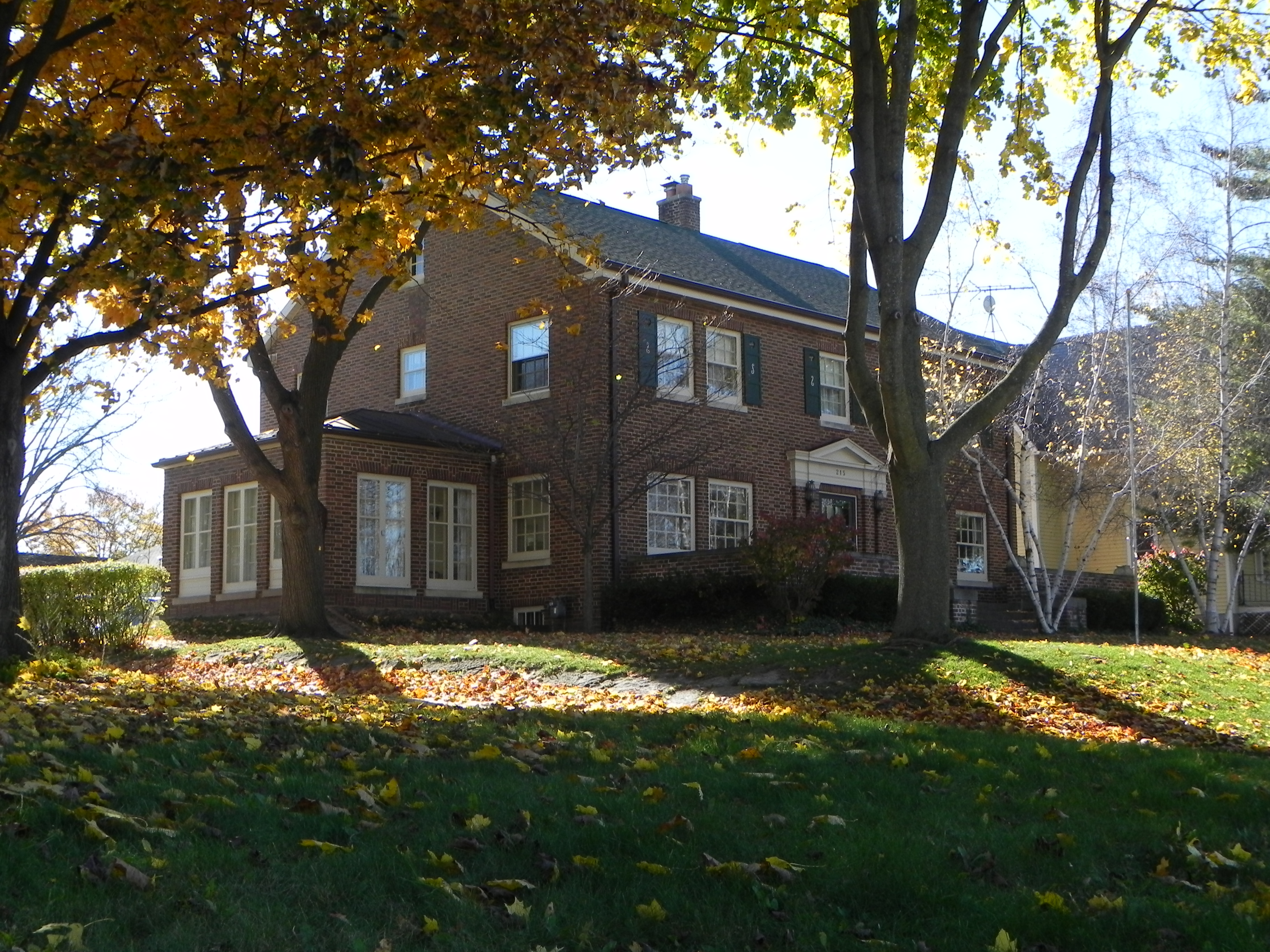
George A. Kissel House

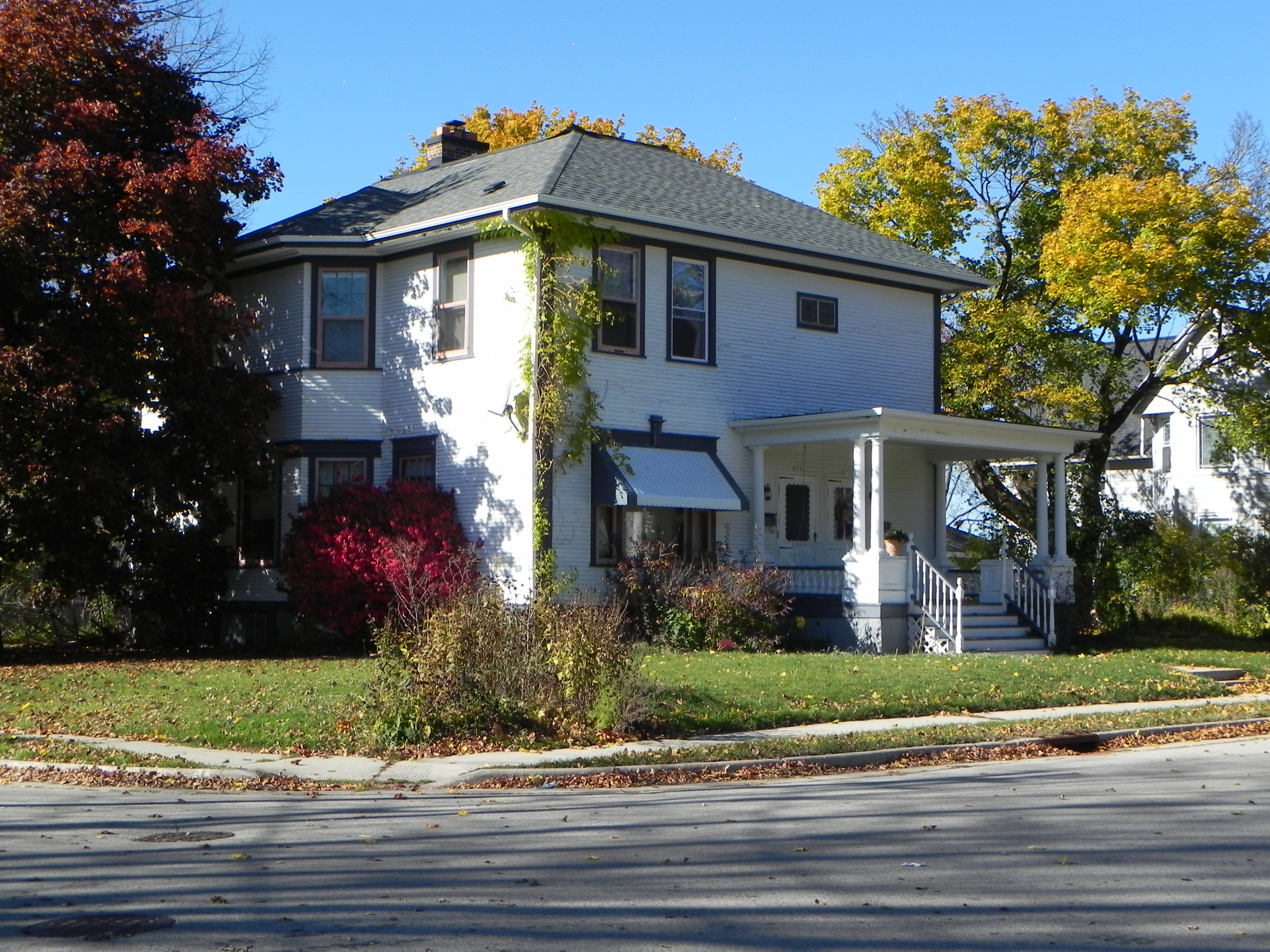
William L. Kissel House

Several buildings are listed on the National Register of Historic Places and among them are some of the Kissel houses as well as houses they built for others.

The Hartford post office contains an oil on canvas mural, Autumn Wisconsin Landscape, painted in 1940 by Ethel Spears. It was produced for the Section of Painting and Sculpture (later the Section of Fine Arts) of the Treasury Department as part of the WPA Depression-era employment projects.

== Geography ==
According to the United States Census Bureau, the city has a total area of 8.02 square miles (20.77 km^{2}), of which 7.94 square miles (20.56 km^{2}) is land and 0.08 square miles (0.21 km^{2}) is water.

Hartford is located within the Kettle Moraine, a large moraine formed when the Green Bay and Lake Michigan Lobes collided. These glacial movements created varied land formations such as kettles, lakes, hills, and kames that distinguish the region.

=== Tornado of 2006 ===
The city was the site of an F1 tornado on June 18, 2006, which caused minor damage to homes in the area, and major damage on the city's south side. Lincoln Elementary School and the Silver Bell Motel both suffered roof and structural damage.

=== Climate ===
Climate data for Hartford, Wisconsin (1991–2020 normals, extremes 1897–1901, 1953–present)
Month	Jan	Feb	Mar	Apr	May	Jun	Jul	Aug	Sep	Oct	Nov	Dec	Year
Record high °F (°C)	55 (13)	69 (21)	83 (28)	88 (31)	94 (34)	100 (38)	105 (41)	101 (38)	97 (36)	89 (32)	75 (24)	65 (18)	105 (41)
Mean maximum °F (°C)	45.6 (7.6)	50.3 (10.2)	65.0 (18.3)	77.1 (25.1)	85.1 (29.5)	90.4 (32.4)	91.1 (32.8)	89.2 (31.8)	86.9 (30.5)	79.1 (26.2)	63.9 (17.7)	50.2 (10.1)	93.2 (34.0)
Mean daily maximum °F (°C)	25.9 (−3.4)	29.9 (−1.2)	41.3 (5.2)	54.3 (12.4)	66.7 (19.3)	76.6 (24.8)	80.2 (26.8)	78.6 (25.9)	71.8 (22.1)	58.7 (14.8)	43.8 (6.6)	31.3 (−0.4)	54.9 (12.7)
Daily mean °F (°C)	17.2 (−8.2)	20.7 (−6.3)	31.5 (−0.3)	43.7 (6.5)	55.5 (13.1)	65.5 (18.6)	69.2 (20.7)	67.4 (19.7)	60.1 (15.6)	47.9 (8.8)	34.8 (1.6)	23.3 (−4.8)	44.7 (7.1)
Mean daily minimum °F (°C)	8.5 (−13.1)	11.4 (−11.4)	21.7 (−5.7)	33.2 (0.7)	44.3 (6.8)	54.4 (12.4)	58.2 (14.6)	56.2 (13.4)	48.4 (9.1)	37.1 (2.8)	25.9 (−3.4)	15.4 (−9.2)	34.6 (1.4)
Mean minimum °F (°C)	−13.9 (−25.5)	−9.2 (−22.9)	1.5 (−16.9)	20.5 (−6.4)	31.1 (−0.5)	41.5 (5.3)	48.1 (8.9)	45.3 (7.4)	34.2 (1.2)	23.7 (−4.6)	10.9 (−11.7)	−4.5 (−20.3)	−18.3 (−27.9)
Record low °F (°C)	−35 (−37)	−34 (−37)	−23 (−31)	1 (−17)	20 (−7)	31 (−1)	39 (4)	36 (2)	23 (−5)	9 (−13)	−11 (−24)	−29 (−34)	−35 (−37)
Average precipitation inches (mm)	1.52 (39)	1.26 (32)	1.78 (45)	3.43 (87)	3.82 (97)	4.77 (121)	3.89 (99)	3.74 (95)	3.23 (82)	2.91 (74)	2.06 (52)	1.68 (43)	34.09 (866)
Average snowfall inches (cm)	10.0 (25)	9.1 (23)	4.0 (10)	1.4 (3.6)	0.3 (0.76)	0.0 (0.0)	0.0 (0.0)	0.0 (0.0)	0.0 (0.0)	0.3 (0.76)	1.1 (2.8)	10.1 (26)	36.3 (92)
Average precipitation days (≥ 0.01 in)	9.7	8.4	8.2	10.7	12.0	10.9	9.0	9.2	8.7	10.0	8.5	9.2	114.5
Average snowy days (≥ 0.1 in)	6.2	5.4	2.7	0.6	0.0	0.0	0.0	0.0	0.0	0.1	1.0	4.8	20.8
Source: NOAA

== Transportation ==
Hartford Municipal Airport serves the city and surrounding communities. An air ambulance service has operated at the airport since 2021.

The former Milwaukee Road line between Milwaukee and Oshkosh runs through Hartford.

== Demographics ==
Historical population
Census	Pop.	Note	%±
1880	1,343		—
1890	1,296		−3.5%
1900	1,632		25.9%
1910	2,982		82.7%
1920	4,515		51.4%
1930	3,754		−16.9%
1940	3,910		4.2%
1950	2,549		−34.8%
1960	5,627		120.8%
1970	6,499		15.5%
1980	7,159		10.2%
1990	8,188		14.4%
2000	10,978		34.1%
2010	14,223		29.6%
2020	15,626		9.9%
2019 (est.)	15,445		8.6%
U.S. Decennial Census

=== 2020 census ===
As of the 2020 census, Hartford had a population of 15,626. The median age was 39.4 years. 23.9% of residents were under the age of 18 and 17.4% of residents were 65 years of age or older. For every 100 females there were 96.3 males, and for every 100 females age 18 and over there were 94.2 males age 18 and over.

98.1% of residents lived in urban areas, while 1.9% lived in rural areas.

There were 6,595 households in Hartford, of which 29.3% had children under the age of 18 living in them. Of all households, 47.7% were married-couple households, 18.7% were households with a male householder and no spouse or partner present, and 26.0% were households with a female householder and no spouse or partner present. About 31.4% of all households were made up of individuals and 14.1% had someone living alone who was 65 years of age or older.

There were 6,834 housing units, of which 3.5% were vacant. The homeowner vacancy rate was 0.5% and the rental vacancy rate was 3.6%.

Racial composition as of the 2020 census
Race	Number	Percent
White	14,059	90.0%
Black or African American	170	1.1%
American Indian and Alaska Native	53	0.3%
Asian	158	1.0%
Native Hawaiian and Other Pacific Islander	4	0.0%
Some other race	364	2.3%
Two or more races	818	5.2%
Hispanic or Latino (of any race)	974	6.2%

=== 2010 census ===
As of the census of 2010, there were 14,223 people, 5,685 households, and 3,721 families residing in the city. The population density was 1,791.3 inhabitants per square mile (691.6/km^{2}). There were 6,032 housing units at an average density of 759.7 units per square mile (293.3 units/km^{2}). The racial makeup of the city was 94.7% White, 0.9% African American, 0.5% Native American, 0.8% Asian, 1.8% from other races, and 1.2% from two or more races. Hispanic or Latino people of any race were 4.8% of the population.

There were 5,685 households, of which 35.1% had children under the age of 18 living with them, 51.4% were married couples living together, 9.1% had a female householder with no husband present, 5.0% had a male householder with no wife present, and 34.5% were non-families. 28.3% of all households were made up of individuals, and 11.5% had someone living alone who was 65 years of age or older. The average household size was 2.47 and the average family size was 3.06.

The median age in the city was 35.6 years. 26.5% of residents were under the age of 18; 7.5% were between the ages of 18 and 24; 29.4% were from 25 to 44; 23.1% were from 45 to 64; and 13.6% were 65 years of age or older. The gender makeup of the city was 49.1% male and 50.9% female.

=== 2000 census ===
As of the census of 2000, there were 10,978 people, 1,397 households, and 1,152 families residing in the city. The population density was 133.6 people per square mile (51.6 people/km^{2}). There were 1,438 housing units at an average density of 47.6 units per square mile (18.4 units/km^{2}). The racial makeup of the town was 98.88% White, 0.20% African American, 0.10% Native American, 0.37% Asian, 0.15% from other races, and 0.30% from two or more races. Hispanic or Latino people of any race were 0.55% of the population.

There were 1,397 households, out of which 40.6% had children under the age of 18 living with them, 74.7% were married couples living together, 4.0% had a female householder with no husband present, and 17.5% were non-families. 14.5% of all households were made up of individuals, and 4.2% had someone living alone who was 65 years of age or older. The average household size was 2.88 and the average family size was 3.19.

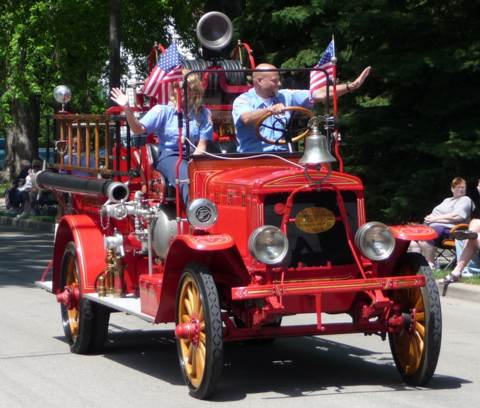
1920s Kissel fire truck in 2008

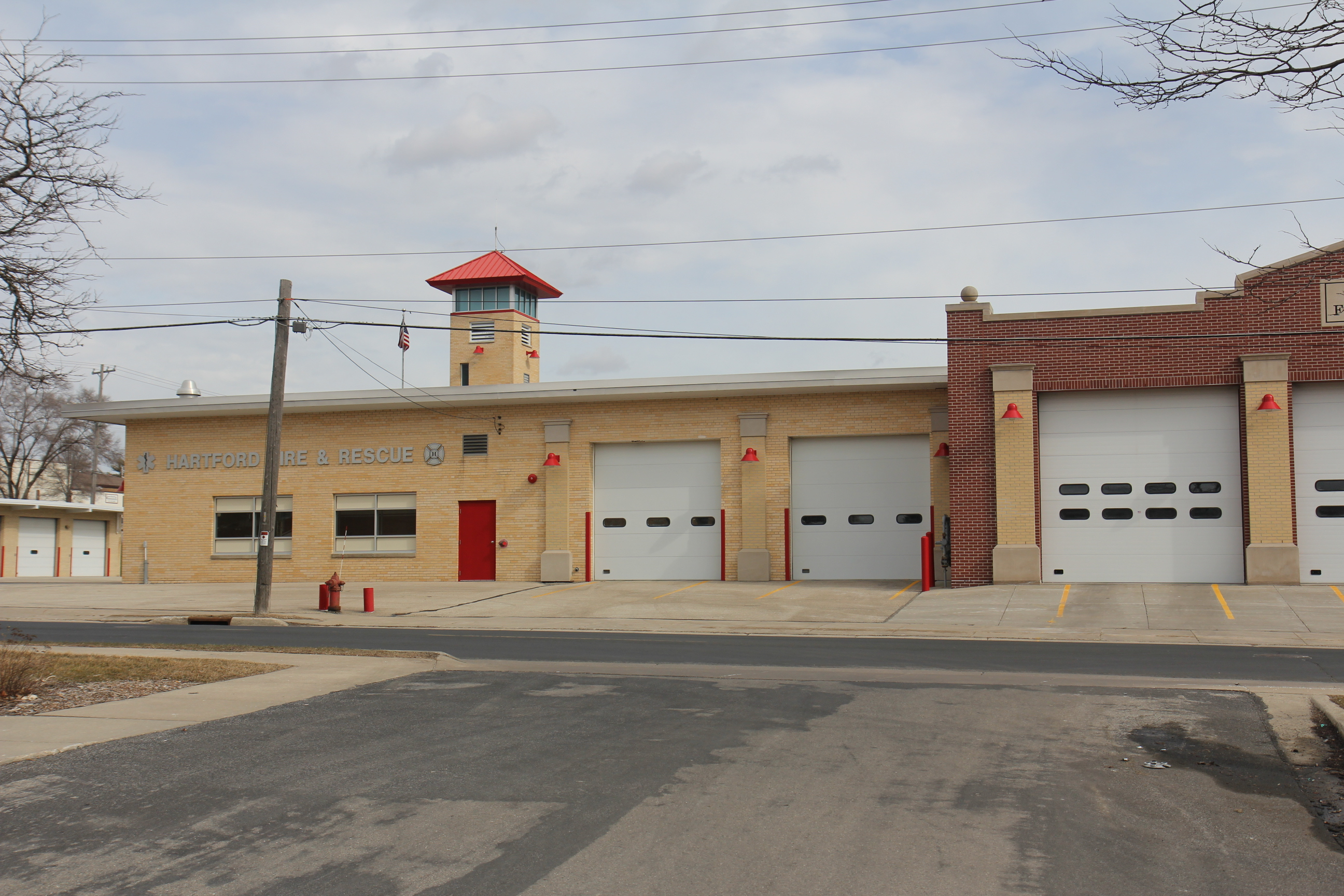
Fire and rescue building

In the city, the age of the population was spread out, with 28.0% under the age of 18, 6.0% from 18 to 24, 31.8% from 25 to 44, 25.8% from 45 to 64, and 8.4% who were 65 years of age or older. The median age was 38 years. For every 100 females, there were 102.6 males. For every 100 females age 18 and over, there were 107.1 males.

=== Income and poverty ===
The median income for a household in the city was estimated at $53,357 and the median income for a family was $73,576. Males had a median income of $42,301 versus $29,727 for females. The per capita income for the town was $26,928. About 1.1% of families and 1.9% of the population were below the poverty line, including 4.5% of those under age 18 and 0.7% of those age 65 or over.

== Government ==
Hartford has a mayor-council form of government. Dennis Regean is the mayor of Hartford. The Common Council is made up of nine aldermen, three elected from each of three aldermanic districts.

== Economy ==
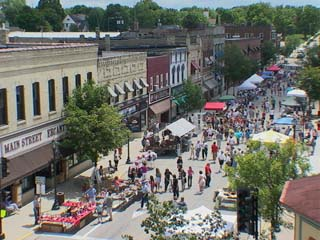
Downtown Hartford on Maxwell Street Day 2006

Hartford was an early car manufacturing center, home to the Kissel Motor Car Company before 1926. The city was the home of a Chrysler Marine engine plant, a Libby's beet processing plant, and now many smaller industries, including the headquarters and a manufacturing site for Broan-NuTone.

=== Kissel ===
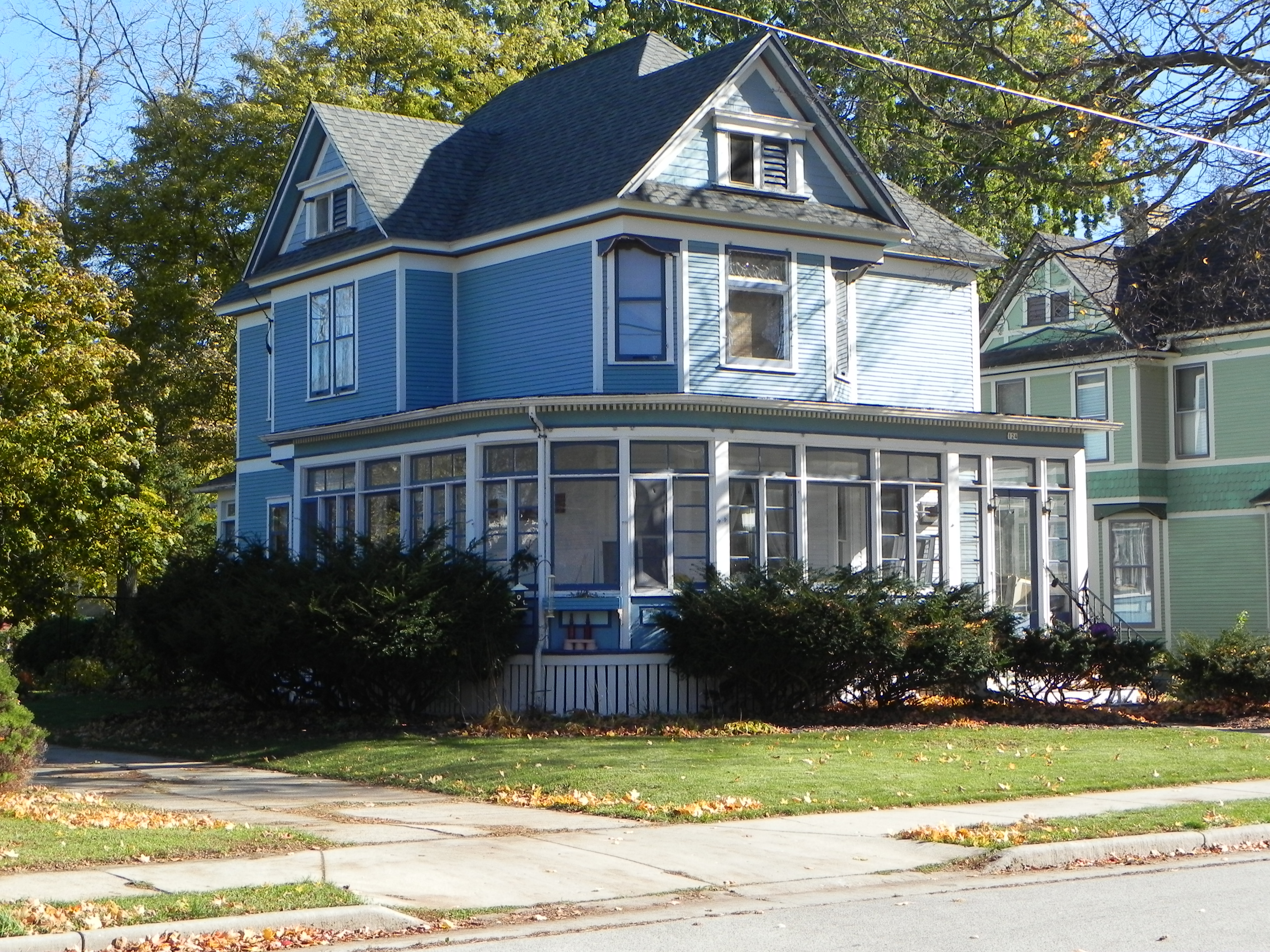
Otto P. Kissel House

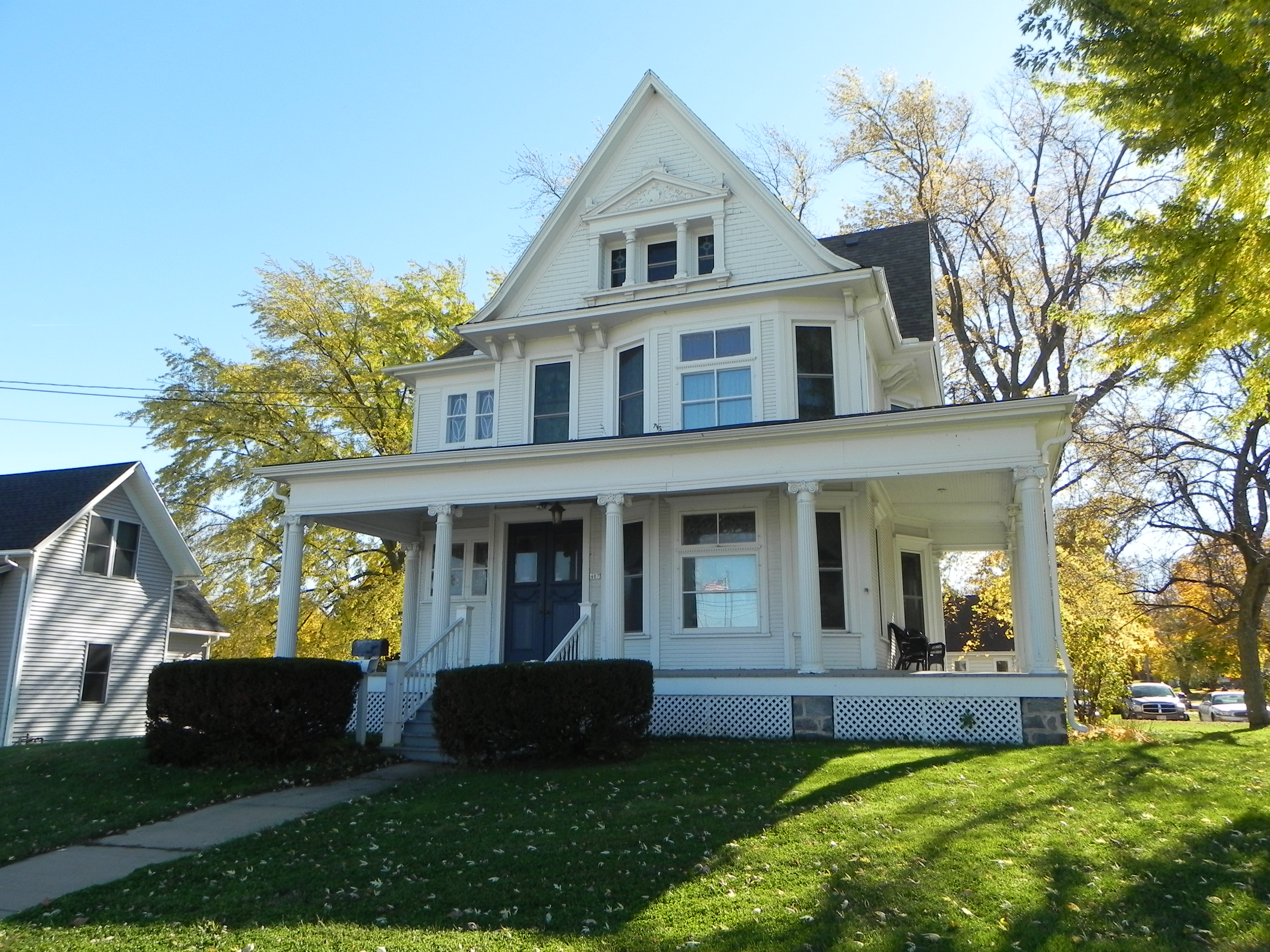
Louis Kissel House

In 1883 Ludwig "Louis" Kissel moved to Hartford and by 1890 he formed a partnership with his sons, Adolph P., Otto P., William L. and George A. that included many businesses beginning with the L. Kissel & Sons Hardware store. Other enterprises ultimately included the Hartford Plow Works (1892) manufacturing and distribution of farm machinery, In addition to distributing engines through Kissel Manufacturing Company for other manufacturers, the Kissels developed their own gasoline engines, both two and four stroke, that even included a boat motor for Sears and Roebuck. Other businesses included the Hartford Electric Company, a stone quarry, and a sand pit.

In 1906, Louis, his four sons, and US District Attorney H. K. Butterfield incorporated the Kissel Motor Car Company. The new auto company started full-scale production in 1907 and continued until 1930. In 1906 Otto, along with John Liver, H. K. Butterfield, and 18 other members formed the First National Bank of Hartford, with capital of $50,000. John was elected president, H. K. Butterfield was elected vice-president and Otto Kissel was elected second vice president. Henry H. Esser was appointed cashier. Liver died in 1925 and Otto was appointed president. In 1923 the Hartford Chamber of Commerce was organized with Otto Kissel, Henry Esser and John Liver as charter members. In 1936 Kissel Industries was formed, the old factory regained, and the company manufactured the Kissel outboard motor, sold as the Waterwitch from 1936 to 1944 exclusively by Sears and Roebuck.

== Education ==
The School District of Hartford provides public education to elementary students in Hartford. Lincoln and Rossman Elementary Schools each serve roughly half of the city's kindergarten through fifth grade student population. Both schools are feeders to Central Middle School, which serves all Hartford students in grades 6 through 8.

Secondary education is provided by Hartford Union High School (HUHS), which is independent of the School District of Hartford. It has an enrollment of about 1500 students. The high school serves the city of Hartford, the Town of Hartford, and most of the surrounding communities including Richfield, Erin, Friess Lake, and Neosho.

Several parochial schools are in the community, including St. Kilian Roman Catholic School and Peace Lutheran.

The city's library is the Jack Russell Memorial Library.

== Area information ==
- The city has annexed parts of the town of Hartford and other areas, including Pike Lake. The Pike Lake Unit of the Kettle Moraine State Forest is situated on the lake.
- The city has a major industrial park on the outskirts of the city, including a Quad Graphics factory that employs many city residents.
- Hartford is home to the Schauer Arts Center, a regional arts center that stages professional touring performances, offers arts classes for all ages, and hosts social and business functions.
- Hartford is also the nearest incorporated municipality to Erin Hills, a public golf course that hosted the 2017 United States Open.

== Notable people ==
- The Amagi, YouTuber
- Samuel S. Barney, Justice of the U.S. Court of Claims and Congressman
- Alfred G. Becker, Wisconsin State Representative
- Jessie Blodgett (1995–2013), American college student and murder victim
- John R. Bohan, Wisconsin State Senator
- Hopewell Coxe, Wisconsin State Representative
- Steve Feak, game designer at Riot Games
- Edward J. Gehl, Wisconsin Supreme Court justice
- Dennis Hall, Olympic wrestler
- Curt Hansen, actor, singer
- Polly Koch, professional football player
- Michael A. Lehman, Wisconsin State Representative
- Quinn Meinerz, NFL football player
- John A. Norman, Wisconsin State Representative
- Jesse Peters, Wisconsin State Senator
- Jacob C. Place, Wisconsin State Representative
- Adam F. Poltl, Wisconsin State Representative and Mayor of Hartford
- Don Pridemore, legislator
- John Reiser, former general manager of Roush Racing NASCAR Busch Series and Truck Series race shops
- Adam Schantz, Wisconsin State Senator
- Ronald A. Sell, Wisconsin State Representative
- John Shinners, NFL player
- Jeremy Unertl, professional football player
- Ericka Walker, artist
- George Weissleder, Wisconsin State Senator
- Joe Hottinger, guitarist for Halestorm
- Melissa Jacobs, adult entertainer

== Sources ==
- Quickert, Carl (1912). Washington County, Wisconsin: Past and Present. Chicago, IL: S. J. Clarke Publishing Company.
