= J. Ralph Corbett =

American businessman and philanthropist

- Born: Joseph R. Korbet; December 5, 1896; New York City, U.S.
- Died: October 3, 1988 (aged 91); Cincinnati, Ohio, U.S.
- Occupation(s): Businessman and Philanthropist
- Known for: Founder of NuTone
- Spouse: Patricia Barry
- Children: Thomas R. Corbett; Gail Corbett Goldsmith
- Parent(s): Barnet Korbet; Pearl Ettlinger

J. Ralph Corbett (December 5, 1896– October 3, 1988) was an American entrepreneur, philanthropist, and arts patron known for founding NuTone, a leading manufacturer of home appliances, and for his transformative support of the Cincinnati arts community. Beginning his career in sales and radio production, Corbett pioneered advancements in home door chimes, growing NuTone into a major national brand. Following the sale of his company in 1967, he and his wife, Patricia Corbett, dedicated their wealth to philanthropy, establishing the Corbett Foundation, which played a critical role in revitalizing Cincinnati's arts institutions, including Cincinnati Opera and Cincinnati Music Hall. Their impact continues to shape the city's cultural landscape.

== Life and career ==
Ralph Corbett was born in 1896 in Flushing, Queens, New York to immigrant parents. He attended Dwight School on scholarship before earning a law degree from New York Law School.

== Death ==
J. Ralph Corbett died in 1988 at the age of 91.
