= Murder of Jessie Blodgett =

2013 murder in Hartford, Wisconsin, US

Jessie Blodgett (March 22, 1994 – July 15, 2013) was an American college student, musician, and activist from Hartford, Wisconsin, who was murdered in her home by a former acquaintance, Daniel Bartelt. Her death led to significant awareness efforts around violence prevention and the establishment of The Love>Hate Project in her memory.

== Early life and education ==
Jessie Blodgett was born in 1994 and grew up in Hartford, Wisconsin. She was an accomplished musician with a passion for teaching and advocacy. Blodgett was studying music education at the University of Wisconsin–Milwaukee and was known for her involvement in local theater productions.

== Murder ==
On July 15, 2013, Blodgett was found dead in her bed by her mother. An autopsy later determined that she had been strangled. Her death shocked the community, particularly since there were no immediate signs of forced entry.

Daniel Bartelt, a former classmate and brief romantic interest, was arrested and charged with Blodgett's murder. Investigators linked Bartelt to the crime through DNA evidence, surveillance footage, and his connection to an earlier attack on another woman in Richfield, Wisconsin. Bartelt had attempted to cover up his involvement by deleting evidence from his devices and misleading authorities.

== Legal proceedings ==
During his trial, prosecutors presented overwhelming evidence of Bartelt's guilt, including forensic findings and his prior history of violent behavior. He was convicted of first-degree intentional homicide and sentenced to life in prison without the possibility of parole.

== Legacy ==
In the aftermath of her murder, Blodgett's parents dedicated themselves to raising awareness about gender-related violence. They founded The Love>Hate Project, an organization aimed at promoting nonviolence, education, and community engagement to prevent similar tragedies. The project continues to advocate for victims and provides resources to young people to foster respectful relationships.

Blodgett's story has been featured in various media outlets, including Dateline NBC and other crime documentary series, highlighting the dangers of intimate partner violence and the importance of awareness and prevention efforts.

== See also ==
- Intimate partner violence
- Violence prevention initiatives
- Advocacy organizations against gender-based violence
