= Jacob C. Place =

American politician (1828–1881)

Jacob C. Place (January 1, 1828 – December 27, 1881) was an American politician.

Born in Johnstown, New York, Place moved to Wisconsin in 1850 and settled in Hartford, Wisconsin. He was a glove maker and livestock dealer. In 1880, Place served in the Wisconsin State Assembly and was a Democrat. Place died in Hartford, Wisconsin.
