= Pike Lake Unit, Kettle Moraine State Forest =

State Forest in Washington County, Wisconsin

Pike Lake Unit Kettle Moraine State Forest
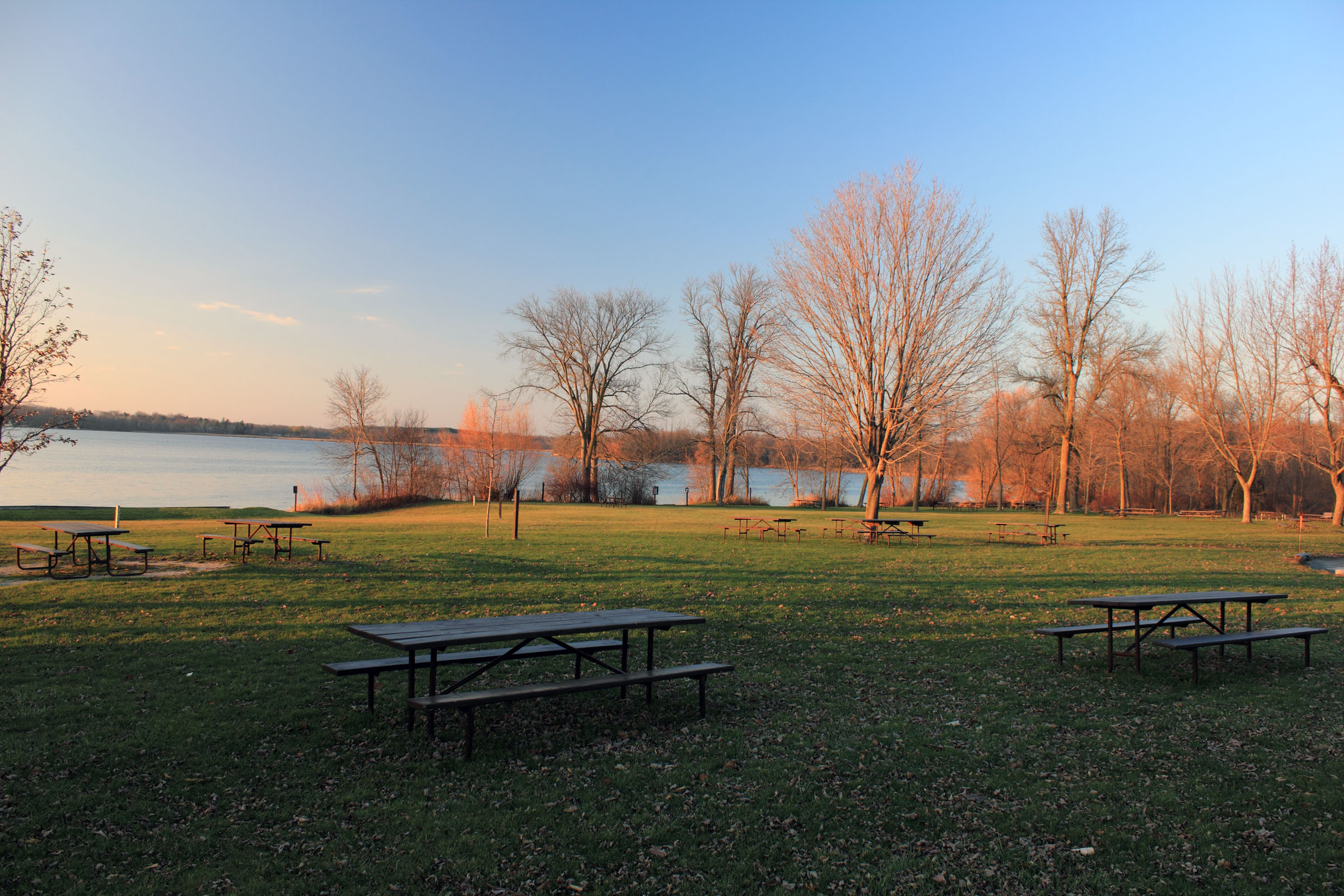

- Location within Wisconsin Location within the United States
- Interactive map of Pike Lake Unit; Kettle Moraine State Forest
- Location: Washington County, Wisconsin, United States
- Coordinates: 43°18′41″N 88°18′50″W
- Area: 678 acres (274 ha)
- Established: 1960
- Administrator: Wisconsin Department of Natural Resources
- Website: Official website
- Wisconsin State Forests

The Pike Lake Unit of the Kettle Moraine State Forest is a 825-acre (334 ha) unit of the Wisconsin state park system. The unit is located just east of Hartford, Wisconsin on State Highway 60, on the east shore of the 461-acre (187 ha) Pike Lake. It was dedicated by Wisconsin governor Patrick J. Lucey in June 1971.

The park provides a campground, a beach, an observation tower, hiking and biking trails and a naturalist program. A section of the Ice Age National Scenic Trail runs through the park as it follows the Kettle Moraine.

Pike Lake was formed by a melting ice block. At the edge of this tongue of the glacier, sediment was carried upward to the top of the ice sheet. When the ice block melted, an immense hallow, or kettle, was left which filled with water creating Pike Lake.

Powder Hill is a glacial feature called a kame. Meltwater rivers washed through the retreating glacial lobes cutting cracks in the ice and washing mounds of till into the breech. The mound of stream-packed till emerged as the surrounding ice sheets melted and the material around it sank.

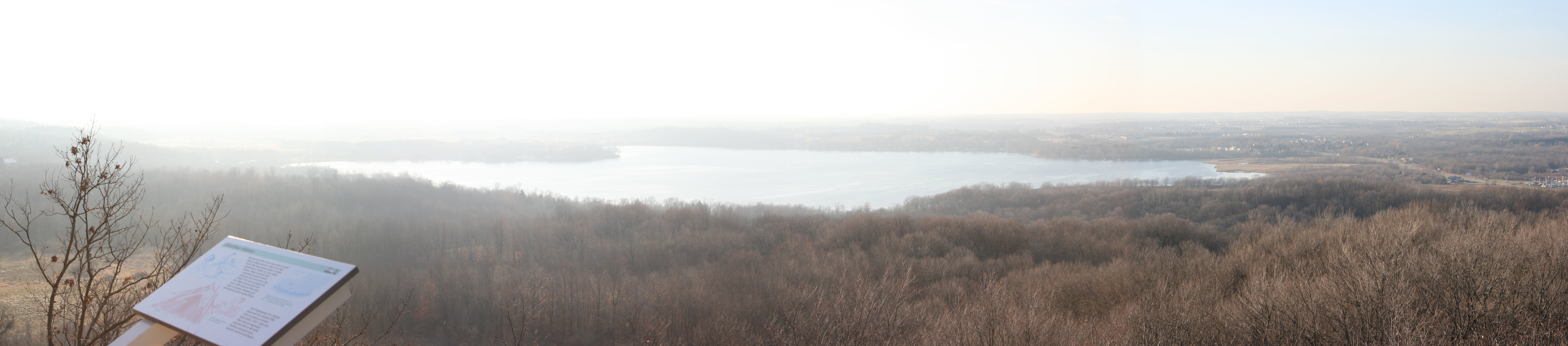
Panorama of Pike Lake from the observation tower
