= Hartford Municipal Airport =

Airport in Wisconsin, United States

- IATA: none; ICAO: KHXF; FAA LID: HXF

Summary
- Airport type: Public
- Owner: City of Hartford
- Serves: Hartford, Wisconsin
- Opened: June 1978
- Time zone: CST (UTC−06:00)
  - Summer (DST): CDT (UTC−05:00)
- Elevation AMSL: 1,070 ft (330 m)
- Coordinates: 43°21′00″N 088°23′25″W

Map
- Location of airport in Wisconsin HXF (the United States)

Runways
Direction	Length		Surface
Direction	ft	m	Surface
9/27	3,401	1,037	Asphalt
18/36	2,231	680	Turf

Statistics
- Aircraft operations (2022): 15,500
- Based aircraft (2024): 91
- Source: Federal Aviation Administration

Hartford Municipal Airport (ICAO: KHXF, FAA LID: HXF) is a public use airport in Washington County, Wisconsin, United States. The airport is owned by and located two nautical miles (4 km) northwest of the central business district of the city of Hartford. It is included in the Federal Aviation Administration (FAA) National Plan of Integrated Airport Systems for 2025–2029, in which it is categorized as a local general aviation facility.

Although many U.S. airports use the same three-letter location identifier for the FAA and IATA, this facility is assigned HXF by the FAA but has no designation from the IATA.

== Facilities and aircraft ==
Hartford Municipal Airport covers an area of 378 acres (153 ha) at an elevation of 1,070 feet (326 m) above mean sea level. It has two runways: 9/27 is 3,401 by 75 feet (1,037 x 23 m) with an asphalt surface and approved GPS approaches, and runway 18/36 is 2,231 by 196 feet (680 x 60 m) with a turf surface.

For the 12-month period ending August 10, 2022, the airport had 15,500 aircraft operations, an average of 42 per day: 97% general aviation, 3% air taxi and less than 1% military. In July 2024, there were 91 aircraft based at this airport: 75 single-engine, 1 multi-engine, 1 jet, 3 helicopter and 11 glider.

== See also ==
- List of airports in Wisconsin
