= Kissel Motor Car Company =

Vehicle manufacturer based in Wisconsin, 1906-1942

Coordinates: 43.3230822°N 88.3444706°W

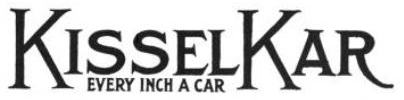
- Type: Automobile Manufacturing
- Industry: Automotive
- Founded: 1906; 120 years ago
- Founder: Louis Kissel
- Defunct: 1931; 95 years ago
- Fate: Bankruptcy
- Headquarters: Hartford, Wisconsin
- Website: www.kisselsandclassiccars.com

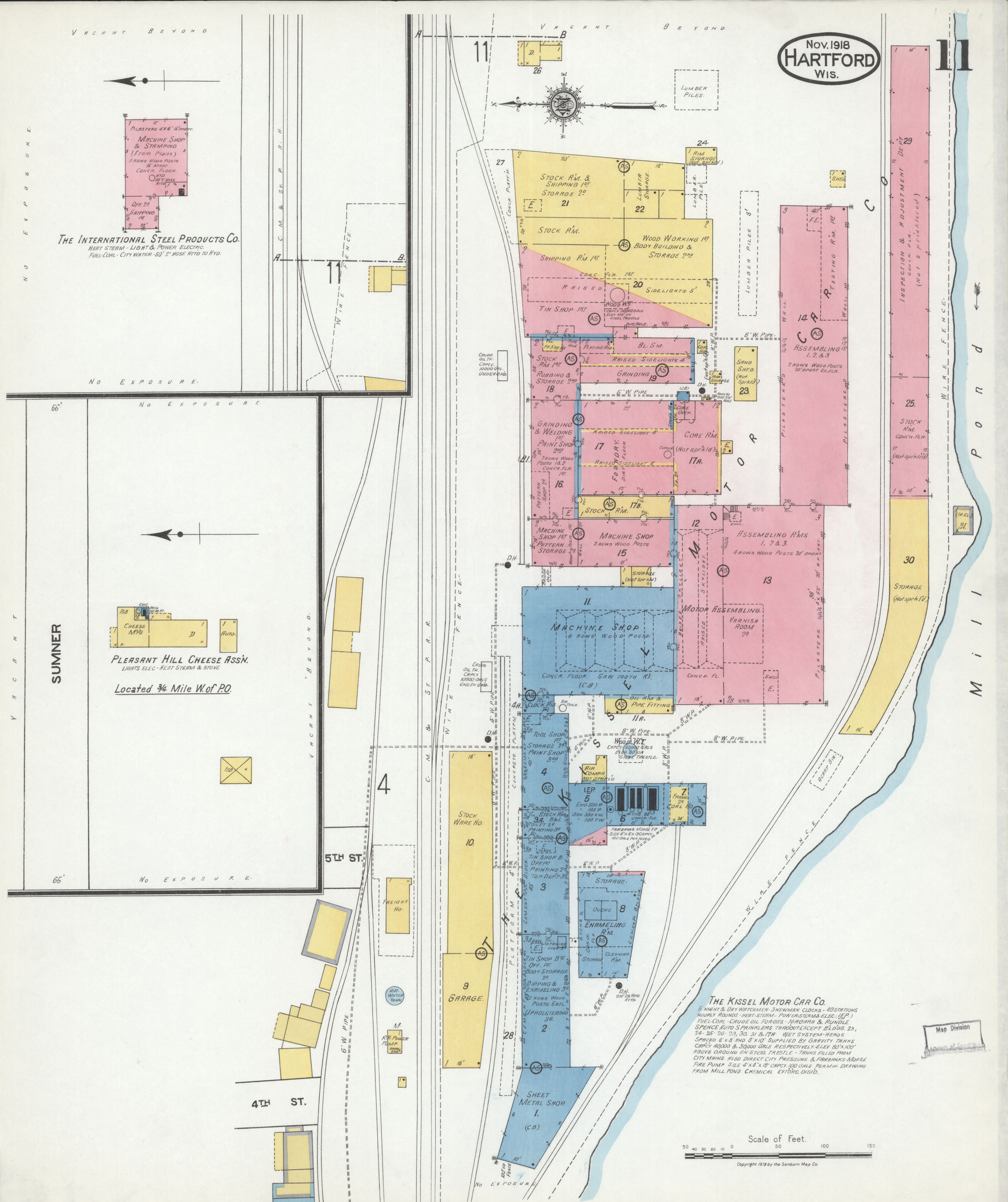
Kissel Plant 1918

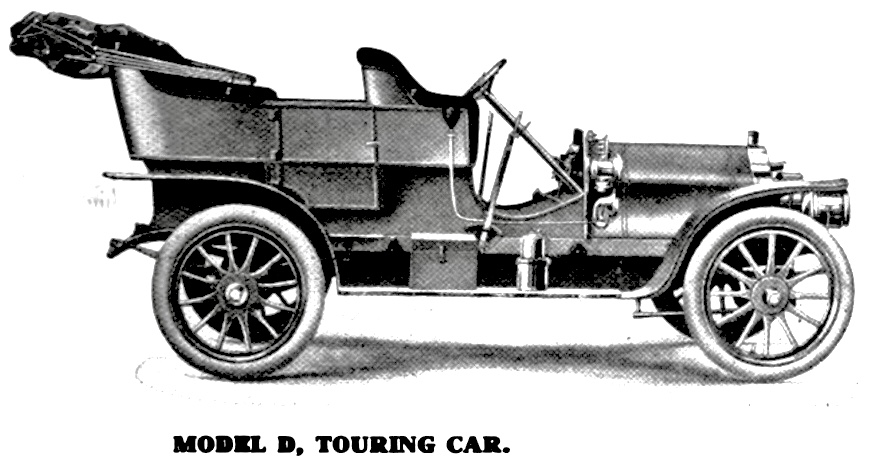
Kissel Kar Model D (1908)

KisselKar advertisement (1911)

The Kissel Motor Car Company was an American automobile and truck manufacturer founded by Louis Kissel and his sons, in Hartford, Wisconsin. The company custom built high-quality automobiles, hearses, fire trucks, taxicabs, and trucks at their plant on 123 Kissel Avenue in Hartford.

== History ==
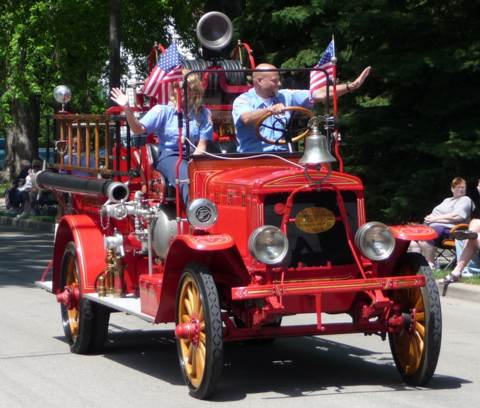
1920's Kissel Fire Truck - 2008 Hartford, WI 4th of July Parade

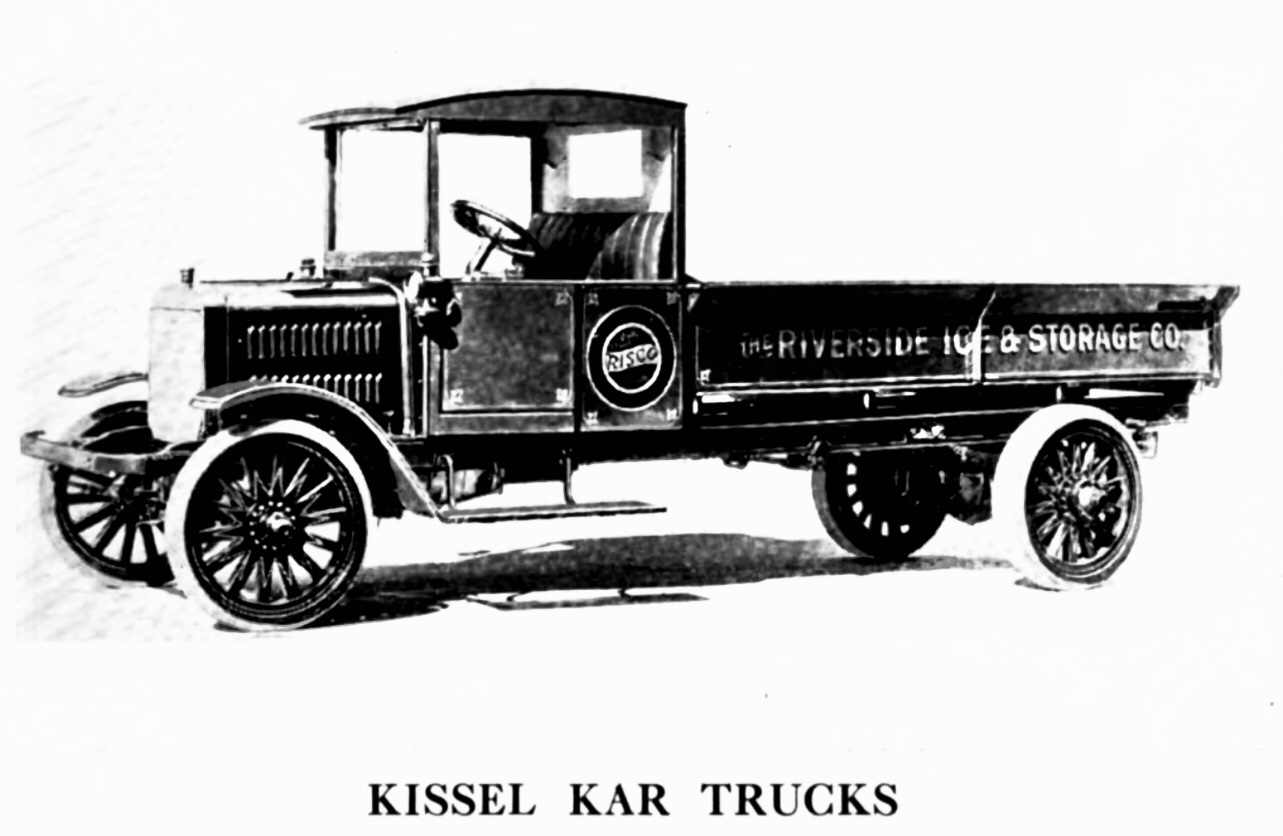
Kissel Heavy Duty Truck (1919) 3,5t

Conrad Kissel (b.1812, d. 1872) emigrated from Prussia to Addison in Washington County, Wisconsin in 1857. His son, Louis C. Kissel, moved to Hartford, Wisconsin, in 1883. In 1890, Louis, in a partnership with his four sons Adolph P., Otto P., William L. and George A., opened Kissel Hardware Store, the Hartford Plow Company that manufactured and distributed farm machinery, Kissel Manufacturing Company, and the Hartford Electric Company. Through Kissel Manufacturing Company, they distributed engines for various manufacturers and developed their own gasoline engines including outboard boat motors. The partnership was also involved in home building and sales through, a stone quarry, sand pit, and facilities for milling their own finished lumber. In 1906 Otto formed the First National Bank of Hartford as a principal shareholder and became Vice-President. In 1925 Otto was elected president and held that position until retiring in January 1933.

In 1906 the Kissel Motor Car Company was incorporated by Louis, his four sons, and US District Attorney H. K. Butterfield. The company began production in 1907. Kissel prospered after the war but with stiff competition and the Great Depression, mounting losses, and an attempted hostile take-over by New Era Motors' president Archie Andrews, forced Kissel to file for receivership protection in November 1930.

=== Kissel Kar, Kissel ===
In 1907 the Kissel Motor Car Company, advertised as "Kissel Kar". Approximately 200 of the 35,000 automobiles the company produced are known to exist today along with at least one of the Kissel-built FWD Model B trucks. The Wisconsin Automotive Museum of Hartford has several of these remaining cars on display. And the Doughery Auto Museum of Longmont, Colorado has a 3 ton truck on display.

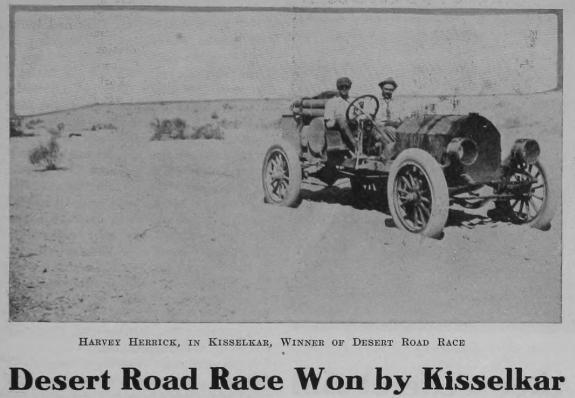
Harvey Herrick and his mechanician in Phoenix, Arizona, after winning the 1910 Cactus Derby

The Kissel marque experienced some sporting success, with Harvey Herrick winning the 1910 Los Angeles to Phoenix "Cactus Derby" road race behind the wheel of a "KisselKar." The most famous Kissel was one the company donated to Hollywood actress Anita King for her transcontinental trip in 1915 that marked the first-ever such trip by a female driving alone. The most popular Kissel model was the 1919 thru 1927 Speedster, nicknamed the Gold Bug. The two passenger (sometimes four-passenger) Gold Bug was owned by famous personalities of the time such as actor Roscoe Arbuckle and aviator Amelia Earhart. Beginning in 1927, Kissel also produced the sporty White Eagle Speedster.

The complete model line from 1914 is as follows:

- Model 32 High Efficiency Four five-passenger four-door touring
- Model 42-Six seven-passenger three-door de luxe touring with over-sized tires
- Model 32 High Efficiency Four with Detachable Coupe Top
- Model 32 High Efficiency Four Special four-passenger roadster
- Model 36-Four five-passenger two-door touring
- Model 36-Four roadster
- Model 42-Six' five-passenger four-door touring
- Model 42-Six seven-passenger four-door touring with over-sized tires
- Model 42-Six four-passenger roadster
- Model 42-Six five-passenger two-door de luxe touring
- Model 36-Four with Detachable Coupe Top
- Model 36-Four with Detachable Sedan Top
- Model 42-Six with Detachable Coupe Top
- Model 42-Six with Detachable Sedan Top

==== Gold Bug ====
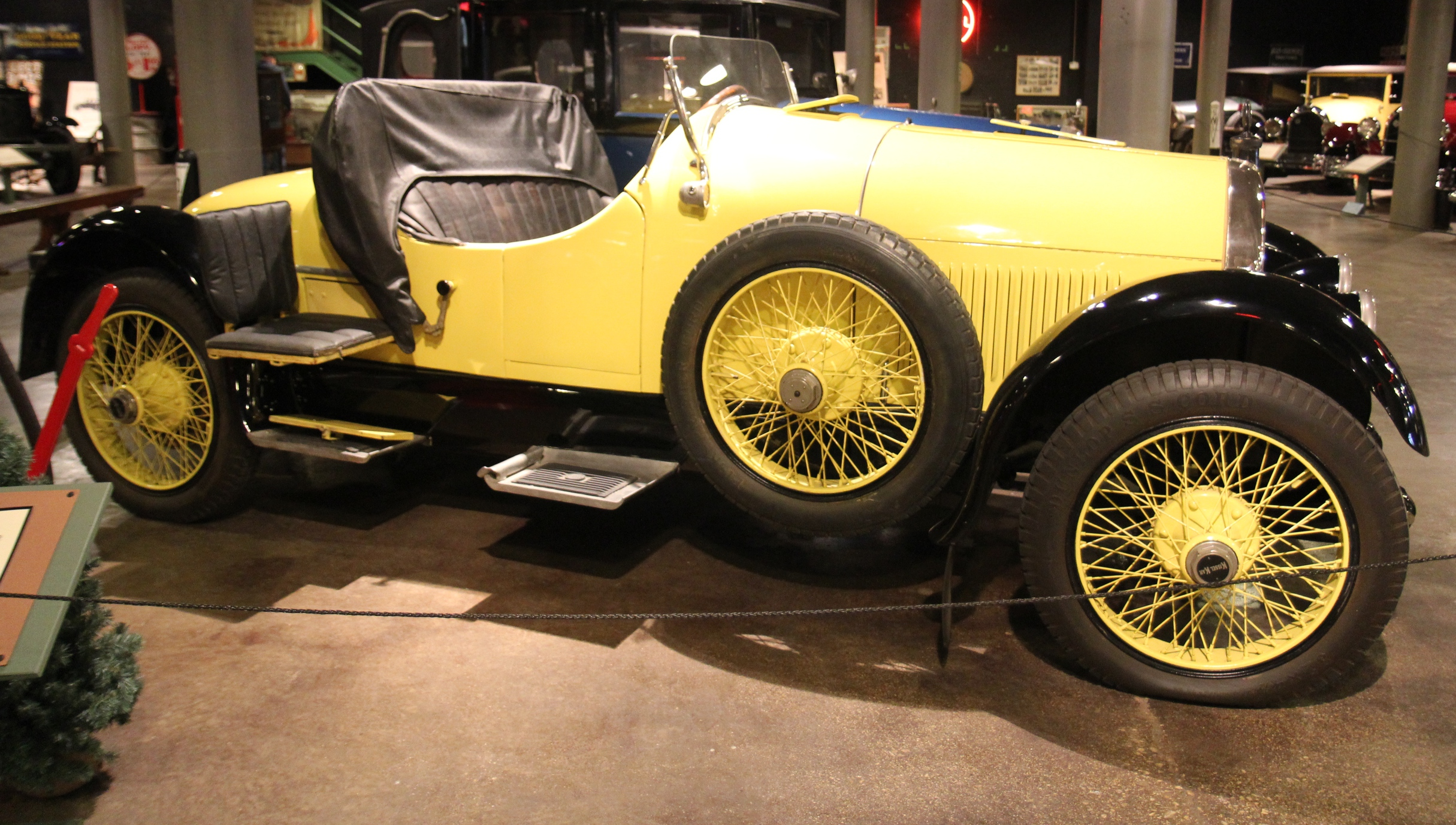
1921 Kissel Gold Bug on display at the Wisconsin Automotive Museum.

The car Kissel referred to as a "speedster" was widely known as the Gold Bug. The car was popular with many other celebrities including Amelia Earhart, Bebe Daniels, Jack Dempsey, Ralph DePalma, Eddie Duchin, Douglas Fairbanks, Greta Garbo, Gladys George, Ruby Keeler, William S. Hart, Al Jolson, Mabel Normand, Mary Pickford, and Rudy Vallee. A 1923 Gold Bug (model 6-45), one of four survivors from that model and year, was owned by Andrew Kissel and William Ruger. The 1927 Kissel Gold Bug Coupe Roadster was used in the movie The Eddy Duchin Story in 1956.

The only remaining 1921 Kissel Gold Bug Speedster won "Best in Class - Vintage Era Sporting" at the 2018 Pebble Beach Concours d'Elegance and won "Best in Class - American Spirit - 1920 to 1931" at the 2019 Elegance at Hershey.

Kissel used Mercury as its logo. In the late 1930s, Henry Ford requested use of the logo for a new marque the Ford Motor Company was planning to introduce, and permission was granted.

=== Kissel Trucks ===
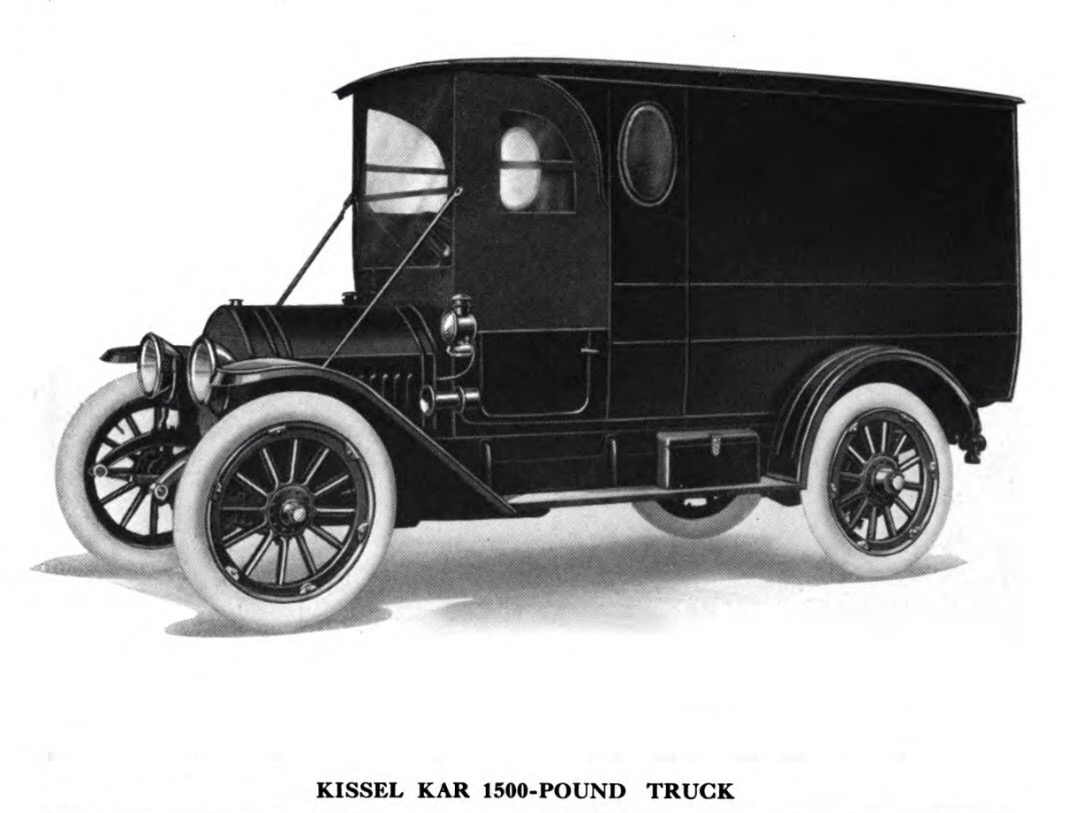
Kissel Kar 0,7t (1915)

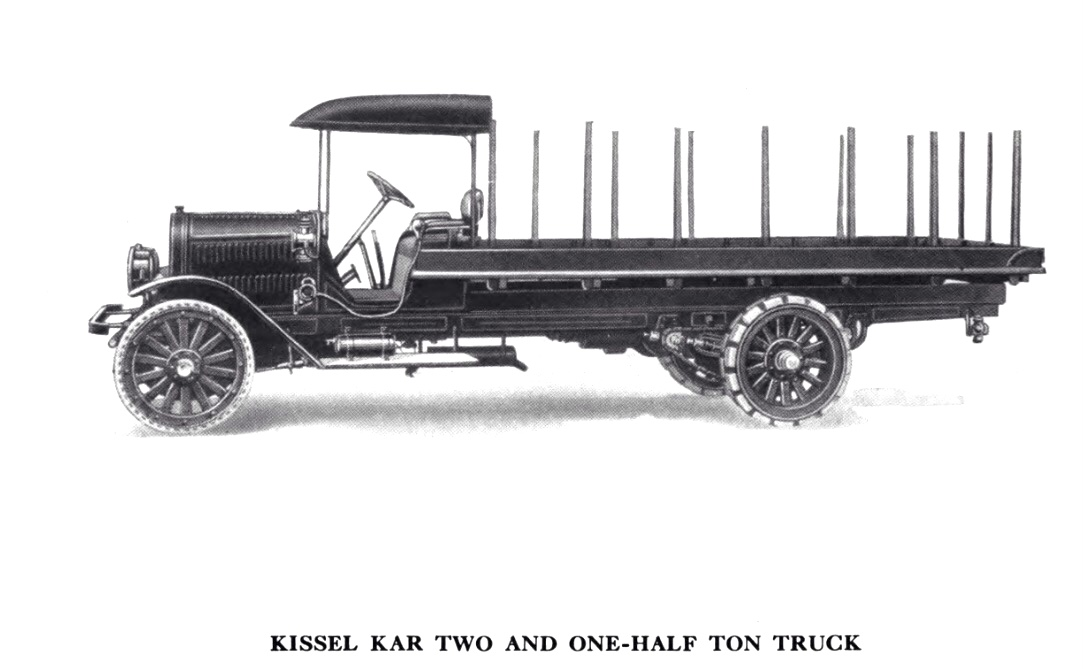
Kissel Kar 2,5t (1915)

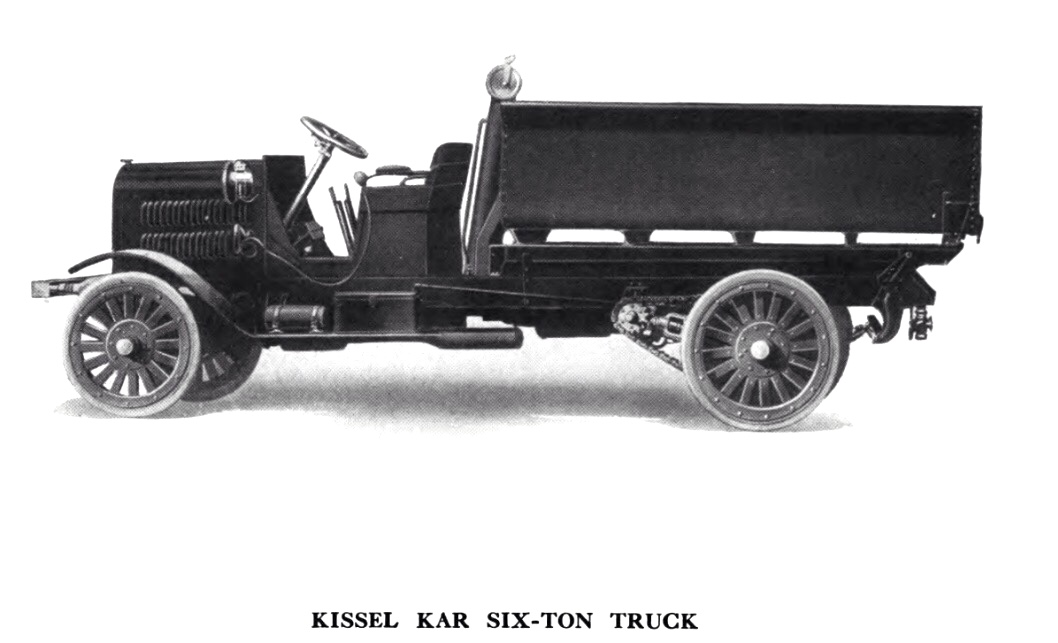
Kissel Kar 6t (1915)

Kissel manufactured trucks of 3/4, 1, 2, 3, 4, and 5 tons, and maintained a sales office at 2515 Michigan Avenue in Chicago, Illinois in early 1913. In 1915 the company (542 Kissel Ave.) advertised in the National Lumberman the new models that included a 1000 lb. and 6 ton replaced the 5 ton.

During World War I the company produced trucks for the US military and for the allies prior to the U.S. entry into the war. In June 1915 Kissel shipped 30 ambulances and 50 heavy service trucks to the Kingdom of Serbia. By 1918 Kissel was producing FWD Model B 3 ton "Buddy" trucks (not to be confused with the Standard B "Liberty" 3-ton truck) under license from the Clintonville, Wisconsin based Four Wheel Drive Auto Company for the U.S War Department.

=== West Bend Company ===
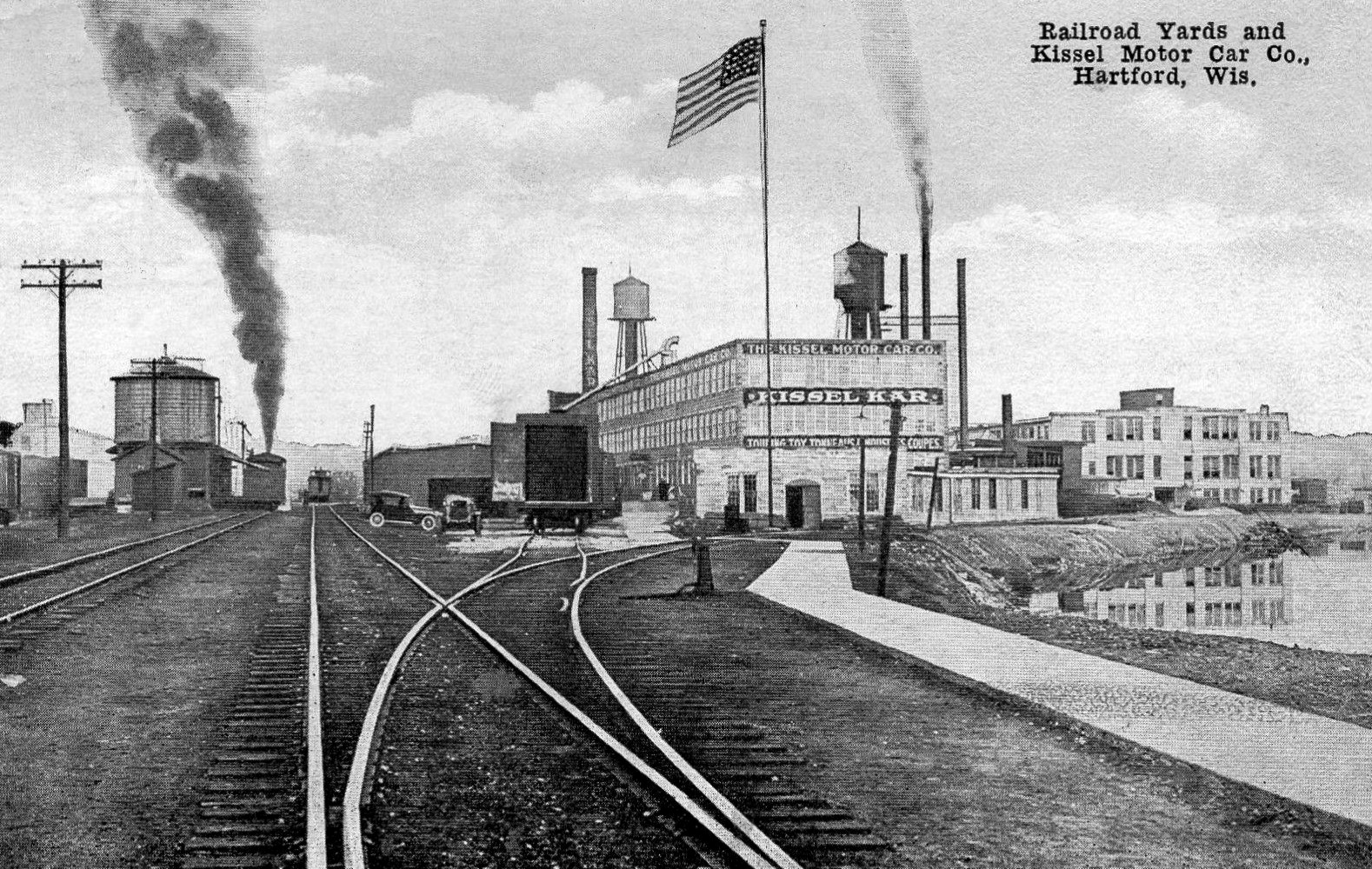
The factory in 1921.

In 1935, the Kissels manufactured outboard motors and were major suppliers of Sears, Roebuck. In 1942 the business was sold to the West Bend Aluminum Company.

== Advertisements ==
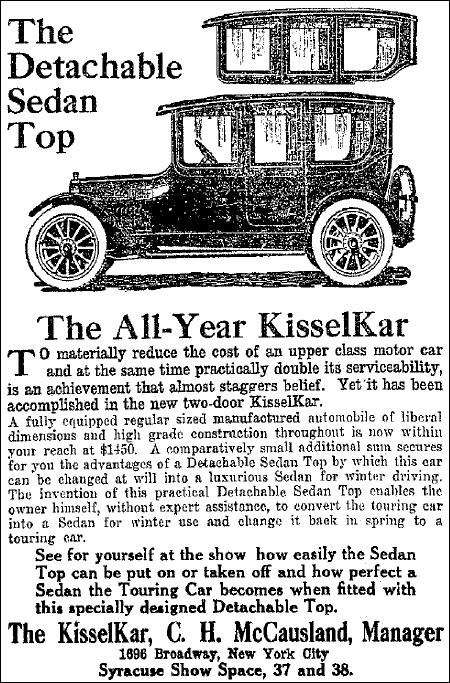
A 1915 KisselKar Advertisement - Syracuse Herald, February 23, 1915

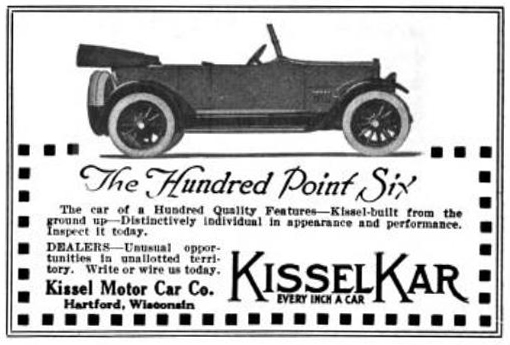
A 1917 KisselKar Advertisement - Automotive Industries, Vol. 37, 1917

KisselKar advertisement (1913)

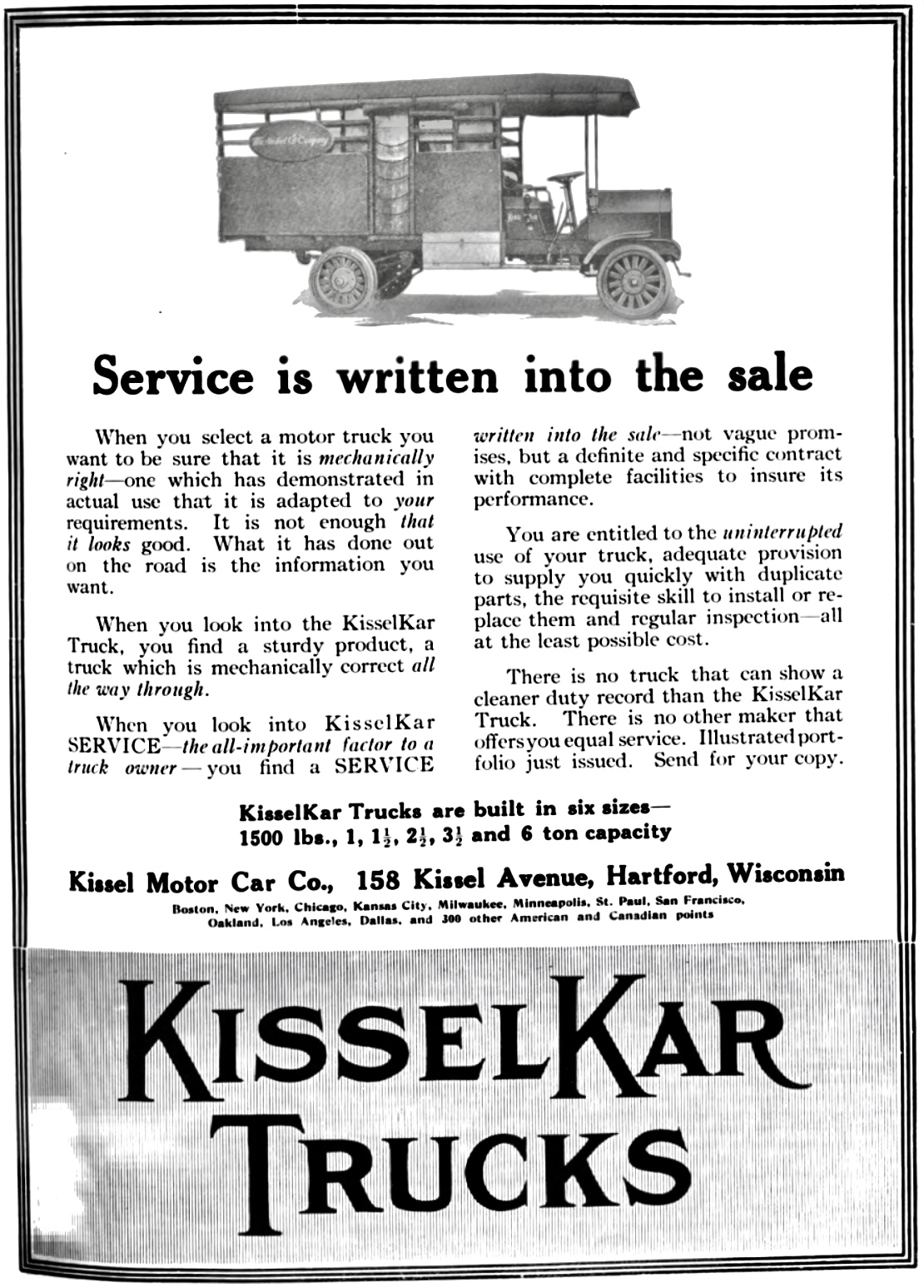
KisselKar Trucks (1914)

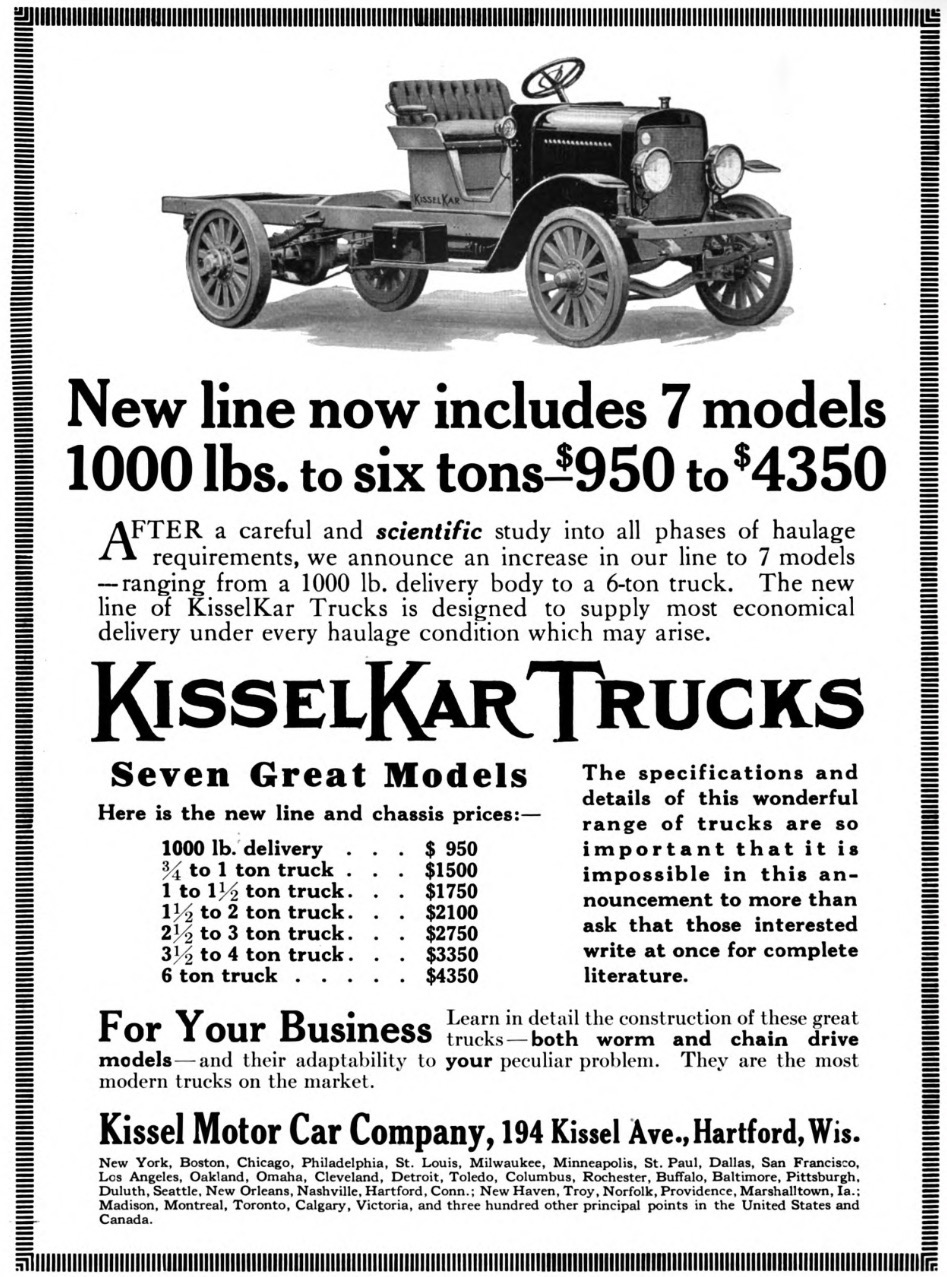
Kissel Kar Trucks advertisement (1915)
