= NuTone =

US residential product manufacturer

- Industry: Manufacturing
- Founded: 1936; 89 years ago
- Founder: J. Ralph Corbett
- Products: Doorbells; intercom systems; indoor air quality products; ventilation systems; range hoods; ceiling fans; electric heating; built-in electric heaters; ironing equipment; home theater systems
- Website: www.nutone.com

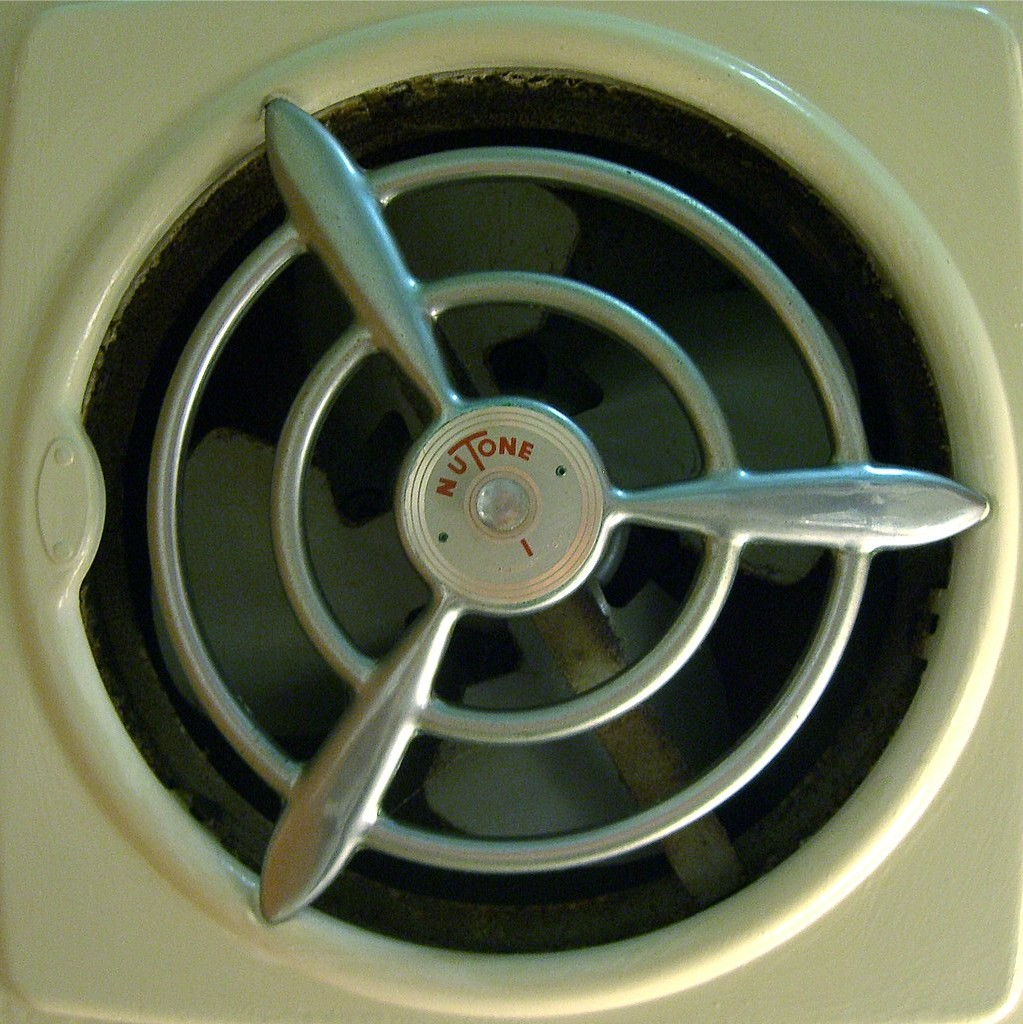
A NuTone ceiling exhaust fan.

NuTone is an American company that manufactures products mainly for residential use, including doorbells, intercom systems, indoor air quality products, ventilation systems, range hoods, ceiling fans, built-in electric heaters, ironing equipment, and home theater systems.

The company was founded in 1936 by J. Ralph Corbett in Cincinnati, Ohio. Corbett backed an inventor from Dayton, Ohio who was marketing a doorbell that could replace door buzzers. The inventor defaulted on Corbett's loan, and Corbett marketed the product under the NuTone brand, reducing production costs enough to make doorbells affordable and creating the doorbell market. NuTone became a publicly traded company in 1955. Other NuTone-created products that started production in the mid-20th century included residential kitchen ventilator hoods (range hoods), home intercom systems and built-in kitchen countertop appliances (the NuTone Food Center was made from 1956 through the mid 1990s). In 1967, when the Corbetts sold their interest in the company to the Scovill Manufacturing Company, NuTone was the largest American producer of home electrical products. The British home products manufacturer Valor purchased it in 1987 for $460 million. Nortek, Inc. acquired it from Williams plc in 1998 for $242.5 million, adding it to the Broan Group.
