= Milwaukee metropolitan area =

Metropolitan area in Wisconsin, United States

- Metropolitan statistical area
- Milwaukee–Waukesha–West Allis, WI Metropolitan Statistical Area
- Downtown Milwaukee
Map of Milwaukee–Racine–Waukesha, WI CSA
City of Milwaukee
Milwaukee–Waukesha, WI MSA
Racine–Mount Pleasant, WI MSA
Whitewater–Elkhorn, WI µSA
Beaver Dam, WI µSA
Watertown–Fort Atkinson, WI µSA
- Coordinates: 43°15′00″N 88°10′00″W
- Country: United States
- State: Wisconsin
- Largest city: Milwaukee
- Other cities: Waukesha; West Allis; Racine; Whitewater; Elkhorn; Lake Geneva; Beaver Dam; Watertown; Fort Atkinson; Mequon

Area
  - Total: 3,356 sq mi (8,690 km^{2})

Population (2020)
  - Total: ▲1,574,739

GDP
  - Total: $130.857 billion (2023)
- Time zone: UTC−6 (CST)
  - Summer (DST): UTC−5 (CDT)

The Milwaukee metropolitan area (also known as Metro Milwaukee or Greater Milwaukee) is a major metropolitan area in southeastern Wisconsin, United States, consisting of the city of Milwaukee and some of the surrounding area.

The U.S. Office of Management and Budget (OMB) defines the Milwaukee–Waukesha, WI Metropolitan Statistical Area as consisting of Milwaukee, Ozaukee, Washington and Waukesha counties. With a population of 1.58 million, it is the largest metropolitan area in Wisconsin and the 40th-largest metropolitan area in the U.S. The greater Milwaukee–Racine–Waukesha, WI Combined Statistical Area is defined by the OMB to additionally include Dodge, Jefferson, Racine, and Walworth counties. With a population of 2.06 million, it is the 34th-largest combined statistical area in the country.

== Definitions ==
=== Metropolitan area ===
Historical population
Census	Pop.	Note	%±
1840	5,948		—
1850	69,820		1,073.8%
1860	128,653		84.3%
1870	157,687		22.6%
1880	206,397		30.9%
1890	318,065		54.1%
1900	405,198		27.4%
1910	511,194		26.2%
1920	624,109		22.1%
1930	821,566		31.6%
1940	876,954		6.7%
1950	1,014,211		15.7%
1960	1,278,850		26.1%
1970	1,403,688		9.8%
1980	1,397,143		−0.5%
1990	1,432,149		2.5%
2000	1,500,741		4.8%
2010	1,555,908		3.7%
2020	1,574,739		1.2%
2025 (est.)	1,575,010		0.0%
U.S. Decennial Census; 1790–1960 1900–1990; 1990–2000; 2025 Estimate

The U.S. Office of Management and Budget (OMB) defines the Milwaukee–Waukesha, WI Metropolitan Statistical Area as containing four counties in southeastern Wisconsin: Milwaukee and the three WOW counties: Ozaukee, Washington, and Waukesha. The U.S. Census Bureau estimated the population of the Milwaukee MSA to be 1,575,179 in 2025, making it the 41st largest in the United States.

The city of Milwaukee is the hub of the metropolitan area. The eastern parts of Racine County, eastern parts of Waukesha County, southern part of Ozaukee County, southeastern part of Washington County, and remainder of Milwaukee County are the most urbanized parts of the outlying counties.

The character of the area varies widely. Mequon, Brookfield, and the North Shore (Fox Point, Whitefish Bay, River Hills, Shorewood, Glendale, Brown Deer, and Bayside) are more white-collar, while West Milwaukee, West Allis, and St. Francis are more blue-collar.

Metro Milwaukee draws commuters from outlying areas such as Madison, Chicago and the Fox Cities. It is part of the Great Lakes Megalopolis containing an estimated 54 million people.

County	Seat	2025 estimate	2020 Census	Change	Land area	Density
Milwaukee	Milwaukee	924,216	939,489	−1.63%	241 sq mi (620 km^{2})	3,835/sq mi (1,481/km^{2})
Waukesha	Waukesha	417,210	406,978	+2.51%	550 sq mi (1,400 km^{2})	759/sq mi (293/km^{2})
Washington	West Bend	139,238	136,761	+1.81%	431 sq mi (1,120 km^{2})	323/sq mi (125/km^{2})
Ozaukee	Port Washington	94,346	91,503	+3.11%	233 sq mi (600 km^{2})	405/sq mi (156/km^{2})
Total		1,575,010	1,574,731	+0.02%	1,455 sq mi (3,770 km^{2})	1,082/sq mi (418/km^{2})

=== Combined statistical area ===
The Milwaukee–Racine–Waukesha, WI Combined Statistical Area is made up of the Milwaukee–Waukesha, WI MSA (Milwaukee, Waukesha, Washington and Ozaukee counties), the Racine–Mount Pleasant, WI MSA (Racine County), the Beaver Dam, WI Micropolitan Statistical Area (µSA) (Dodge County), the Watertown–Fort Atkinson, WI µSA (Jefferson County), and the Whitewater–Elkorn, WI µSA (Walworth County) according to the OMB. Updated definitions released in February 2013 added Dodge, Jefferson and Walworth Counties to the Milwaukee CSA. Kenosha, despite being just 32 miles from Milwaukee and 50 miles from Chicago, is included as part of the Chicago CSA, as Kenosha has more residents who commute to the Chicago area. As of the 2025 census estimates, the Milwaukee–Racine–Waukesha Combined Statistical Area population was 2,055,658, the largest in Wisconsin and the 33rd largest in the United States. The Milwaukee–Racine–Waukesha CSA shares an eastern border with the Madison MSA and the Janesville–Beloit MSA, which in turn are both a part of the Madison–Janesville–Beloit CSA.

Statistical Area	2025 estimate	2020 Census	Change	Land area	Density
Milwaukee–Waukesha, WI Metropolitan Statistical Area	1,575,010	1,574,731	+0.02%	1,455 sq mi (3,770 km^{2})	1,082/sq mi (418/km^{2})
Racine–Mount Pleasant, WI Metropolitan Statistical Area	198,919	197,727	+0.60%	333 sq mi (860 km^{2})	597/sq mi (231/km^{2})
Whitewater–Elkhorn, WI Micropolitan Statistical Area	106,127	106,478	−0.33%	555 sq mi (1,440 km^{2})	191/sq mi (74/km^{2})
Beaver Dam, WI Micropolitan Statistical Area	89,097	89,396	−0.33%	876 sq mi (2,270 km^{2})	102/sq mi (39/km^{2})
Watertown–Fort Atkinson, WI Micropolitan Statistical Area	86,505	84,900	+1.89%	556 sq mi (1,440 km^{2})	156/sq mi (60/km^{2})
Total	2,055,658	2,053,232	+0.12%	3,775 sq mi (9,780 km^{2})	545/sq mi (210/km^{2})

== Counties ==
There are eight counties in the U.S. Census Bureau's Milwaukee–Racine–Waukesha Combined statistical area.

- Dodge
- Jefferson
- Milwaukee
- Ozaukee
- Racine
- Walworth
- Washington
- Waukesha

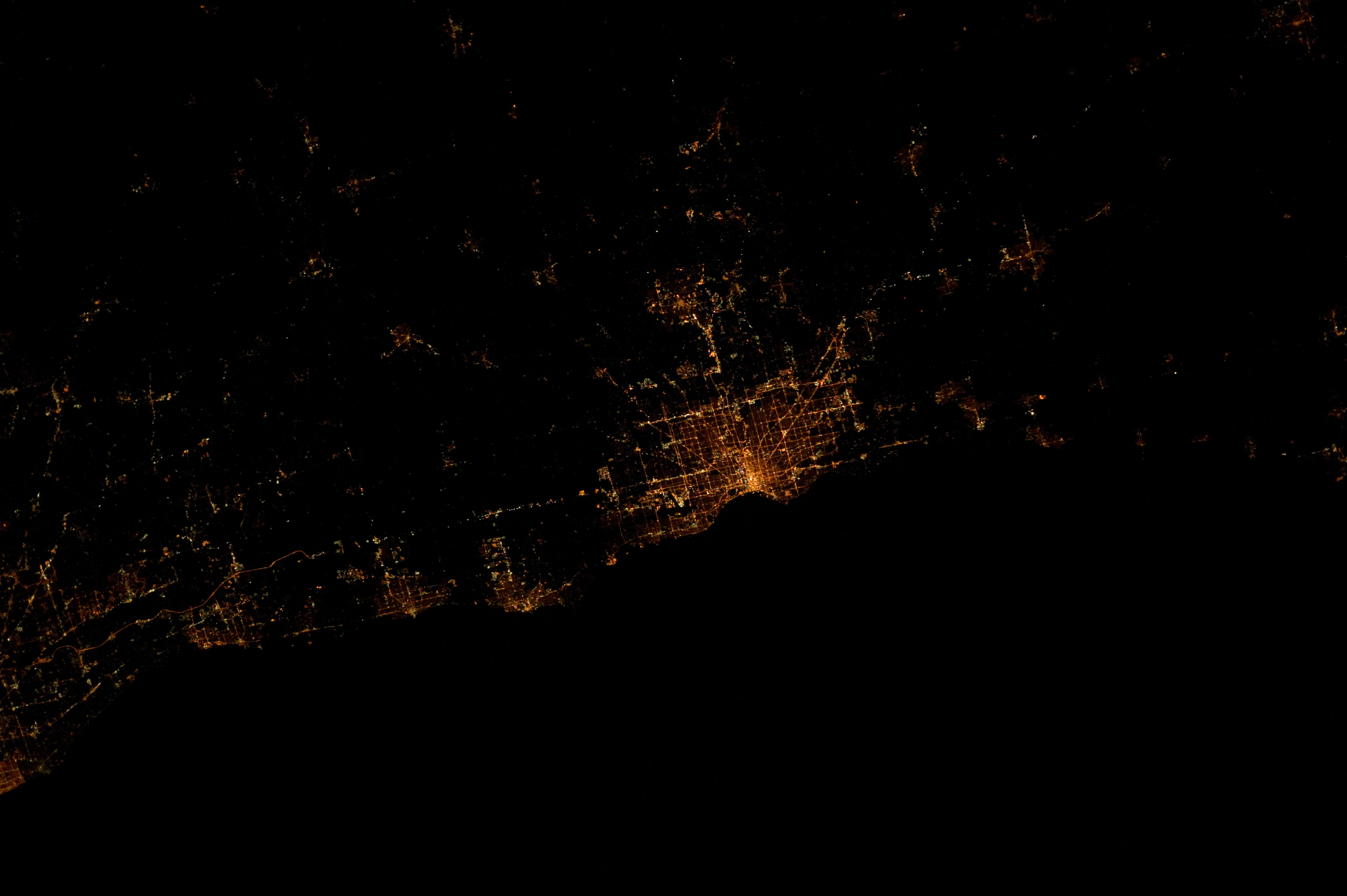
The city at the center is Milwaukee. Above Milwaukee in the photo is Waukesha. It is a 2012 photo from Expedition 30 of the International Space Station. The line of lights connecting the two cities comes from vehicles and development on and along Bluemound Road and I-94. Due to the angle of the photo, north points rightwards, and west upwards. To the left of Milwaukee along the lakeshore are the cities of Racine, Kenosha, and Waukegan. Kenosha and Waukegan are considered part of the Chicago CSA rather than part of metro Milwaukee. The lights in the far left along the lake are from a portion of Cook County, of which Chicago is the county seat. To the right of Milwaukee are Cedarburg and Grafton. Port Washington is just to the right of Grafton and along the lakeshore. Above Port Washington, the "+" shaped lights are from West Bend. In the far right edge, a small portion of Sheboygan can be seen along the lakeshore.

== Cities (combined statistical area) ==
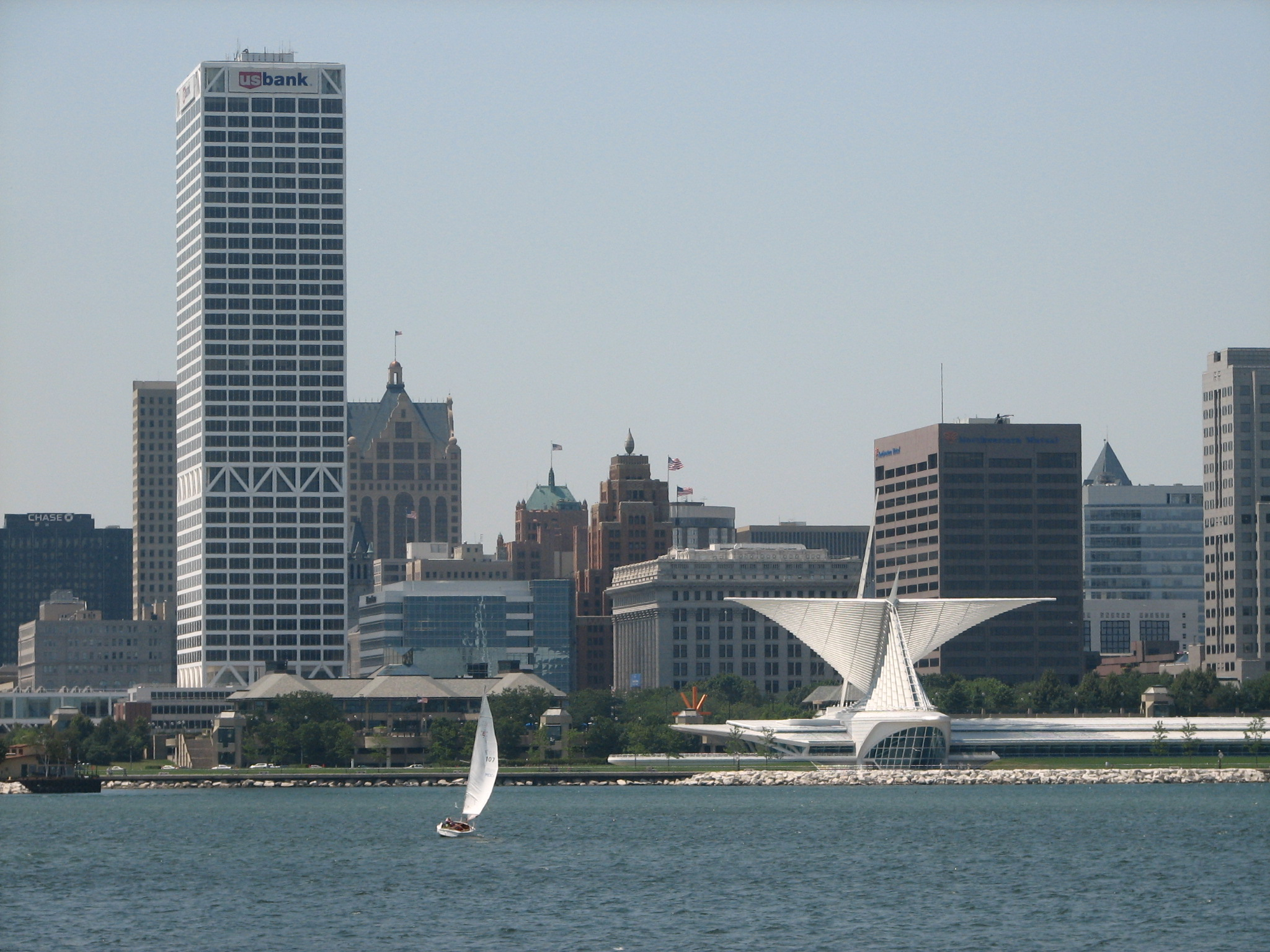
Milwaukee, Wisconsin's largest city

=== Primary ===
- Milwaukee

=== Other principal cities ===
- Racine
- Waukesha

=== Metro area cities and villages with more than 10,000 inhabitants ===
- Beaver Dam
- Brookfield
- Brown Deer
- Burlington
- Caledonia
- Cedarburg
- Cudahy
- Delavan
- Elkhorn
- Fort Atkinson
- Franklin
- Germantown
- Glendale
- Grafton
- Greendale
- Greenfield
- Hartford
- Menomonee Falls
- Mequon
- Mount Pleasant
- Muskego
- New Berlin
- Oak Creek
- Oconomowoc
- Pewaukee
- Port Washington
- Richfield
- Shorewood
- South Milwaukee
- Sussex
- Watertown
- Wauwatosa
- West Allis
- West Bend
- Whitefish Bay
- Whitewater

=== Metro area cities, towns and villages with fewer than 10,000 inhabitants ===
- Addison
- Barton
- Bayside
- Belgium
- Big Bend
- Bohners Lake
- Brookfield (town)
- Browns Lake
- Brownsville
- Butler
- Cambridge (part)
- Chenequa
- Clyman
- Columbus (part)
- Darien
- Delafield (city)
- Delafield (town)
- Dousman
- Dover
- Eagle
- Eagle Lake
- East Troy
- Elkhorn
- Elm Grove
- Elmwood Park
- Erin
- Farmington
- Fox Lake
- Fox Point
- Franksville
- Fredonia
- Genesee
- Germantown (town)
- Hales Corners
- Hartland
- Herman
- Horicon
- Hustisford
- Ixonia
- Iron Ridge
- Jackson
- Jefferson
- Johnson Creek
- Juneau
- Kekoskee
- Kewaskum
- Lac La Belle
- Lake Geneva
- Lake Mills
- Lannon
- Leroy
- Lisbon
- Lomira
- Lowell
- Mayville
- Merton
- Mukwonago
- Nashotah
- Neosho
- Newburg
- North Bay
- North Prairie
- Norway
- Oconomowoc Lake
- Okauchee Lake
- Ottawa
- Palmyra
- Pewaukee(village)
- Polk
- Randolph
- Raymond
- Reeseville
- River Hills
- Rochester
- Rubicon
- Saukville
- Sharon
- Slinger
- St. Francis
- Sturtevant
- Sullivan
- Summit
- Theresa
- Thiensville
- Trenton
- Union Grove
- Vernon
- Wales
- Walworth
- Waterford
- Waterloo
- Waupun (part)
- Wayne
- West Milwaukee
- Williams Bay
- Wind Lake
- Wind Point
- Yorkville

=== Unincorporated Communities and Census Designated Places ===
- Allenton
- Boltonville
- Cheeseville
- Colgate
- Ebenezer
- Farmersville
- Fillmore
- Genesee Depot
- Herman Center
- Hubertus
- Kansasville
- Kohlsville
- Lake Church
- Lakefield
- Myra
- Nabob
- Nenno
- North Cape
- Oak Hill
- Pipersville
- Pike Lake
- Rockfield
- Saint Michaels
- Saylesville
- Saylesville
- Stone Bank
- Thompson
- Tichigan
- Ulao
- Waubeka
- Woodland

== Politics ==
The city of Milwaukee is overwhelmingly Democratic, while suburban Milwaukee County was historically politically divided, but has shifted to the left in recent election cycles. The WOW counties have long been a Republican stronghold for decades, but they have been trending to the left in recent elections. Dodge County, Jefferson County, Walworth County, and Racine County, which are located on the outskirts of the metro lean Republican.

Milwaukee Metro Presidential election results
Year	Democratic	Republican	Third parties
2024	50.8% 591,122	47.4% 551,686	1.8% 20,694
2020	51.3% 583,809	47.6% 535,175	1.6% 18,760
2016	48.1% 500,957	45.7% 476,414	6.2% 64,475
2012	50.9% 568,022	48.0% 535,645	1.1% 11,760
2008	53.1% 569,672	45.7% 490,048	1.2% 12,639
2004	47.6% 512,248	51.5% 552,945	0.9% 9,371
2000	46.0% 436,631	50.2% 476,797	3.8% 36,129

2004 Presidential Election by Municipality

2008 Presidential Election by Municipality

2012 Presidential Election by Municipality

2016 Presidential Election by Municipality

2020 Presidential Election by Municipality

2024 Presidential Election by Municipality

== Debate over metropolitan government ==
Although each county and its various municipalities are self-governing, there is some cooperation in the metropolitan area. The Milwaukee Metropolitan Sewerage District (MMSD) is a state-chartered government agency which serves 28 municipalities in the five counties.

At the same time, some in the area see the need for more consolidation in government services. The Kettl Commission and former Wisconsin Governor Scott McCallum have supported initiatives to do this. However, full consolidation has faced unsubstantiated criticism as a means of diluting minority voting power.
