= Kohlsville River =

River in eastern Wisconsin

- Location within Wisconsin Location within the United States

Location
- Country: United States
- State: Wisconsin

Physical characteristics
- Source: Near Nabob
  - coordinates: 43.4311102°N 88.264818°W
- Mouth: East Branch Rock River
  - location: Theresa Marsh
  - coordinates: 43.4830520°N 88.3759317°W
  - elevation: 932 ft (284 m)
- Length: 9 mi (14 km)

Basin features
- Tributaries
  - right: Wayne Creek

The Kohlsville River is a river in eastern Wisconsin that flows through the community of Kohlsville and into the East Branch Rock River. The entirety of the river is located in Washington County.

== Progression ==
The source is near the community of Nabob, in the town of West Bend. The river is dammed in Kohlsville, creating the Kohlsville Millpond. It then flows under Interstate 41 and joins with the East Branch Rock River in the Theresa Marsh.

== See also ==
List of Wisconsin rivers
