= Germantown, Wisconsin =

Village in Washington County, Wisconsin

- Village
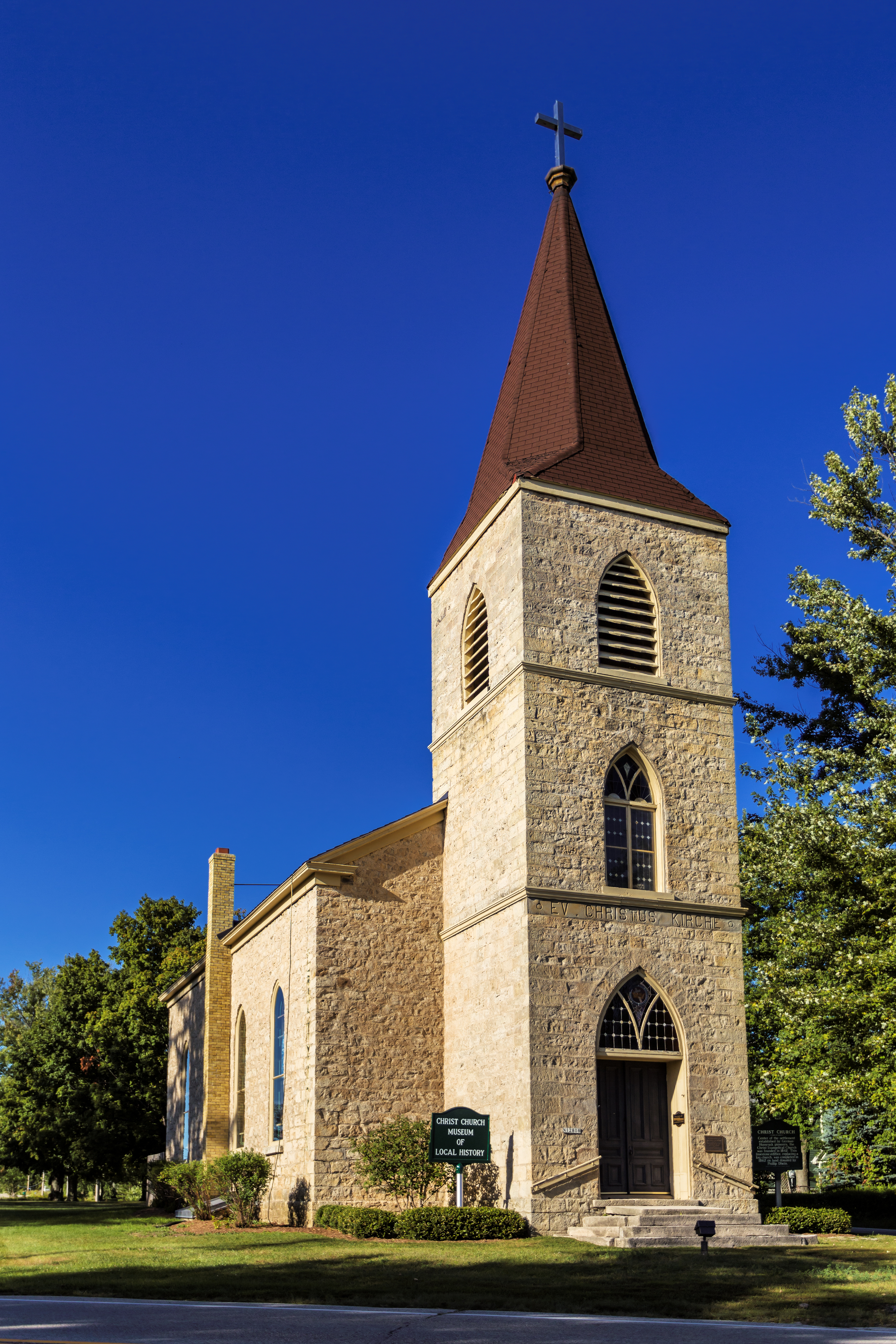
- Christ Evangelical Church

- Flag

- Location of Germantown in Washington County, Wisconsin.

- Location within Wisconsin Location within the United States
- Coordinates: 43°13′23″N 88°7′13″W
- Country: United States
- State: Wisconsin
- County: Washington
- Incorporated: 1927; 99 years ago

Area
  - Total: 34.40 sq mi (89.09 km^{2})
  - Land: 34.37 sq mi (89.03 km^{2})
  - Water: 0.023 sq mi (0.06 km^{2})

Population (2020)
  - Total: 20,917
  - Density: 608.5/sq mi (234.9/km^{2})
- ZIP code: 53022
- Area code: 262
- FIPS code: 55-28875
- Website: www.germantownwi.gov

Germantown is a village in Washington County, Wisconsin, United States. The population was 20,917 at the 2020 census. The village surrounds the Town of Germantown, and is part of the Milwaukee metropolitan area.

== History ==
The land that became Germantown was originally inhabited by members of the Potawatomi tribe. The Potawatomi surrendered the land that became Germantown to the United States Federal Government in 1833 through the 1833 Treaty of Chicago, which (after being ratified in 1835) required them to leave Wisconsin by 1838. While many Native people moved west of the Mississippi River to Kansas, some chose to remain or return after temporarily settling in the west, and were referred to as "strolling Potawatomi" in contemporary documents because many of them were migrants who subsisted by squatting on their ancestral lands, which were now owned by White settlers. In the late 19th and early 20th centuries, the Potawatomi who evaded forced removal gathered in northern Wisconsin and the Upper Peninsula of Michigan where many worked in the timber industry and formed the Forest County Potawatomi Community.

The community was originally designated as the Wisconsin Territory's "Town Nine," making it the oldest settlement in Washington County. Beginning in the 1840s, many German immigrants—particularly from the regions of Bavaria, Hessen, Rheinland, Pommern, and Prussia—settled in the area, which led to it being named "Germantown".

The territorial legislature created the Town of Germantown on January 21, 1846, and the first town meeting was on April 7 of the same year. The town included the then-unincorporated communities of Dheinsville, Goldenthal, Kuhberg (later known as Victory Center), Meeker Hill, Rockfield, South Germantown, and Willow Creek.

In the 19th and early 20th centuries, Germantown's economy relied heavily on agriculture, including dairy farming. The southern part of Germantown is rich in Silurian limestone, which was quarried beginning in the 1870s, particularly in the Rockfield and South Germantown areas. South Germantown was a stop on the Chicago, Milwaukee, and St. Paul starting in the late 19th century, and the hamlet grew and prospered because of its rail connects to other communities.

In 1927, South Germantown incorporated as the Village of Germantown out of some of the town's land but was significantly smaller than it is in the 21st century.

From July 1944 until January 1946, the hamlet of Rockfield in present-day Germantown was the site of Camp Rockfield, an Allied prisoner of war camp that held 500 German prisoners of war, including captured members of the Afrika Korps and many soldiers captured at the Battle of Cherbourg. The prisoners had originally been held at Fort Sheridan, north of Chicago, but were transferred to camps in rural Wisconsin, such as the one at Rockfield, to work in agriculture. The prisoners lived in a barracks that had originally been built as a warehouse for the local Rockfield Canning Company, where many prisoners worked as pea packers. Other POWs were transported to work sites throughout Ozaukee and Washington counties, including the Pick Manufacturing Company in West Bend and the Fromm Bros., Nieman & Co. Fox Ranch in northern Mequon.

In 1963, Milwaukee annexed a small parcel in the southeastern part of the Town of Germantown to expand a landfill. Residents feared that Milwaukee would soon annex more of the town. As a defensive measure, the Village of Germantown annexed all of the surrounding unincorporated hamlets, which became neighborhoods of the village. At the time of the 1963 annexation, Germantown grew to an area of approximately 24 square miles. The village has subsequently annexed most of the town's land, and now has an area of over 34 square miles.

== Geography ==
Germantown is located at 43°13′23″N 88°7′13″W (43.223206, −88.120433).

According to Wisconsin First Nations (a Wisconsin Department of Public Instruction resource), Germantown is located on Potawatomi treaty land. The village also falls within the lands of the Peoria, Menominee, Miami, and Sioux Indigenous peoples, as shown by Canadian not-for-profit organization Native Land Digital.

The United States Census Bureau indicates Germantown has a total area of 34.45 square miles (89.23 km^{2}), of which, 34.42 square miles (89.15 km^{2}) of it is land and 0.03 square miles (0.08 km^{2}) is water.

=== Climate ===
Climate data for Germantown, Wisconsin (1991–2020 normals, extremes 1944–present)
Month	Jan	Feb	Mar	Apr	May	Jun	Jul	Aug	Sep	Oct	Nov	Dec	Year
Record high °F (°C)	58 (14)	72 (22)	83 (28)	89 (32)	93 (34)	99 (37)	104 (40)	102 (39)	99 (37)	89 (32)	77 (25)	67 (19)	104 (40)
Mean daily maximum °F (°C)	27.3 (−2.6)	30.7 (−0.7)	41.9 (5.5)	54.2 (12.3)	66.3 (19.1)	76.3 (24.6)	80.8 (27.1)	79.1 (26.2)	72.2 (22.3)	59.2 (15.1)	45.1 (7.3)	33.0 (0.6)	55.5 (13.1)
Daily mean °F (°C)	19.3 (−7.1)	22.1 (−5.5)	32.8 (0.4)	44.2 (6.8)	55.6 (13.1)	65.3 (18.5)	70.1 (21.2)	68.4 (20.2)	61.1 (16.2)	48.9 (9.4)	36.4 (2.4)	25.4 (−3.7)	45.8 (7.7)
Mean daily minimum °F (°C)	11.3 (−11.5)	13.5 (−10.3)	23.7 (−4.6)	34.2 (1.2)	44.9 (7.2)	54.3 (12.4)	59.5 (15.3)	57.7 (14.3)	49.9 (9.9)	38.7 (3.7)	27.8 (−2.3)	17.9 (−7.8)	36.1 (2.3)
Record low °F (°C)	−40 (−40)	−28 (−33)	−20 (−29)	7 (−14)	20 (−7)	23 (−5)	36 (2)	33 (1)	22 (−6)	8 (−13)	−15 (−26)	−25 (−32)	−40 (−40)
Average precipitation inches (mm)	1.57 (40)	1.44 (37)	1.90 (48)	3.84 (98)	3.95 (100)	4.37 (111)	3.92 (100)	3.80 (97)	3.22 (82)	2.64 (67)	2.00 (51)	1.73 (44)	34.38 (873)
Average snowfall inches (cm)	16.5 (42)	16.0 (41)	6.5 (17)	2.0 (5.1)	0.3 (0.76)	0.0 (0.0)	0.0 (0.0)	0.0 (0.0)	0.0 (0.0)	0.3 (0.76)	2.4 (6.1)	10.3 (26)	54.3 (138)
Average precipitation days (≥ 0.01 in)	9.7	8.0	8.9	11.4	13.4	11.7	10.9	10.8	9.6	11.5	9.5	9.3	124.7
Average snowy days (≥ 0.1 in)	7.0	5.5	3.5	1.1	0.0	0.0	0.0	0.0	0.0	0.2	1.9	5.5	24.7
Source: NOAA

== Demographics ==
Historical population
Census	Pop.	Note	%±
1930	255		—
1940	292		14.5%
1950	357		22.3%
1960	622		74.2%
1970	6,974		1,021.2%
1980	10,729		53.8%
1990	13,658		27.3%
2000	18,260		33.7%
2010	19,749		8.2%
2020	20,917		5.9%

=== 2020 census ===
As of the 2020 census, Germantown had a population of 20,917. The median age was 43.9 years. 22.1% of residents were under the age of 18 and 18.9% of residents were 65 years of age or older. For every 100 females there were 95.1 males, and for every 100 females age 18 and over there were 93.2 males age 18 and over.

84.6% of residents lived in urban areas, while 15.4% lived in rural areas.

There were 8,470 households in Germantown, of which 29.8% had children under the age of 18 living in them. Of all households, 56.8% were married-couple households, 14.4% were households with a male householder and no spouse or partner present, and 23.3% were households with a female householder and no spouse or partner present. About 26.1% of all households were made up of individuals and 12.7% had someone living alone who was 65 years of age or older.

There were 8,803 housing units, of which 3.8% were vacant. The homeowner vacancy rate was 0.3% and the rental vacancy rate was 7.0%.

Racial composition as of the 2020 census
Race	Number	Percent
White	18,160	86.8%
Black or African American	650	3.1%
American Indian and Alaska Native	71	0.3%
Asian	897	4.3%
Native Hawaiian and Other Pacific Islander	2	0.0%
Some other race	151	0.7%
Two or more races	986	4.7%
Hispanic or Latino (of any race)	660	3.2%

=== Demographic estimates ===
Owner occupied housing is 76.7% with a median value of houses reaching $274,900. The median household income in Germantown is $89,100.

=== 2010 census ===
As of the census of 2010, there were 19,749 people, 7,766 households, and 5,501 families living in the village. The population density was 573.8 inhabitants per square mile (221.5/km^{2}). There were 8,092 housing units at an average density of 235.1 per square mile (90.8/km^{2}). The racial makeup of the village was 92.6% White, 2.2% African American, 0.2% Native American, 3.1% Asian, 0.5% from other races, and 1.4% from two or more races. Hispanic or Latino of any race were 2.0% of the population.

There were 7,766 households, of which 35.0% had children under the age of 18 living with them, 59.5% were married couples living together, 7.8% had a female householder with no husband present, 3.6% had a male householder with no wife present, and 29.2% were non-families. 24.1% of all households were made up of individuals, and 9.6% had someone living alone who was 65 years of age or older. The average household size was 2.53 and the average family size was 3.03.

The median age in the village was 41.7 years. 25.4% of residents were under the age of 18; 6.2% were between the ages of 18 and 24; 24% were from 25 to 44; 30.7% were from 45 to 64; and 13.4% were 65 years of age or older. The gender makeup of the village was 48.9% male and 51.1% female.

=== 2000 census ===
As of the census of 2000, there were 18,260 people, 6,904 households, and 5,129 families living in the village. The population density was 530.5 people per square mile (204.8/km^{2}). There were 7,075 housing units at an average density of 205.5 per square mile (79.4/km^{2}). The racial makeup of the village was 95.83% White, 1.35% Black or African American, 0.25% Native American, 1.60% Asian, 0.04% Pacific Islander, 0.34% from other races, and 0.60% from two or more races. 1.12% of the population were Hispanic or Latino of any race.

There were 6,904 households, out of which 37.4% had children under the age of 18 living with them, 63.9% were married couples living together, 7.4% had a female householder with no husband present, and 25.7% were non-families. 20.4% of all households were made up of individuals, and 6.5% had someone living alone who was 65 years of age or older. The average household size was 2.63 and the average family size was 3.08.

In the village, the population was spread out, with 27.1% under the age of 18, 6.4% from 18 to 24, 33.7% from 25 to 44, 23.5% from 45 to 64, and 9.4% who were 65 years of age or older. The median age was 36 years. For every 100 females, there were 97.1 males. For every 100 females age 18 and over, there were 93.3 males.

The median income for a household in the village was $60,742, and the median income for a family was $68,975. Males had a median income of $47,123 versus $31,400 for females. The per capita income for the village was $25,358. About 1.9% of families and 2.5% of the population were below the poverty line, including 2.5% of those under age 18 and 4.7% of those age 65 or over.

== Education ==
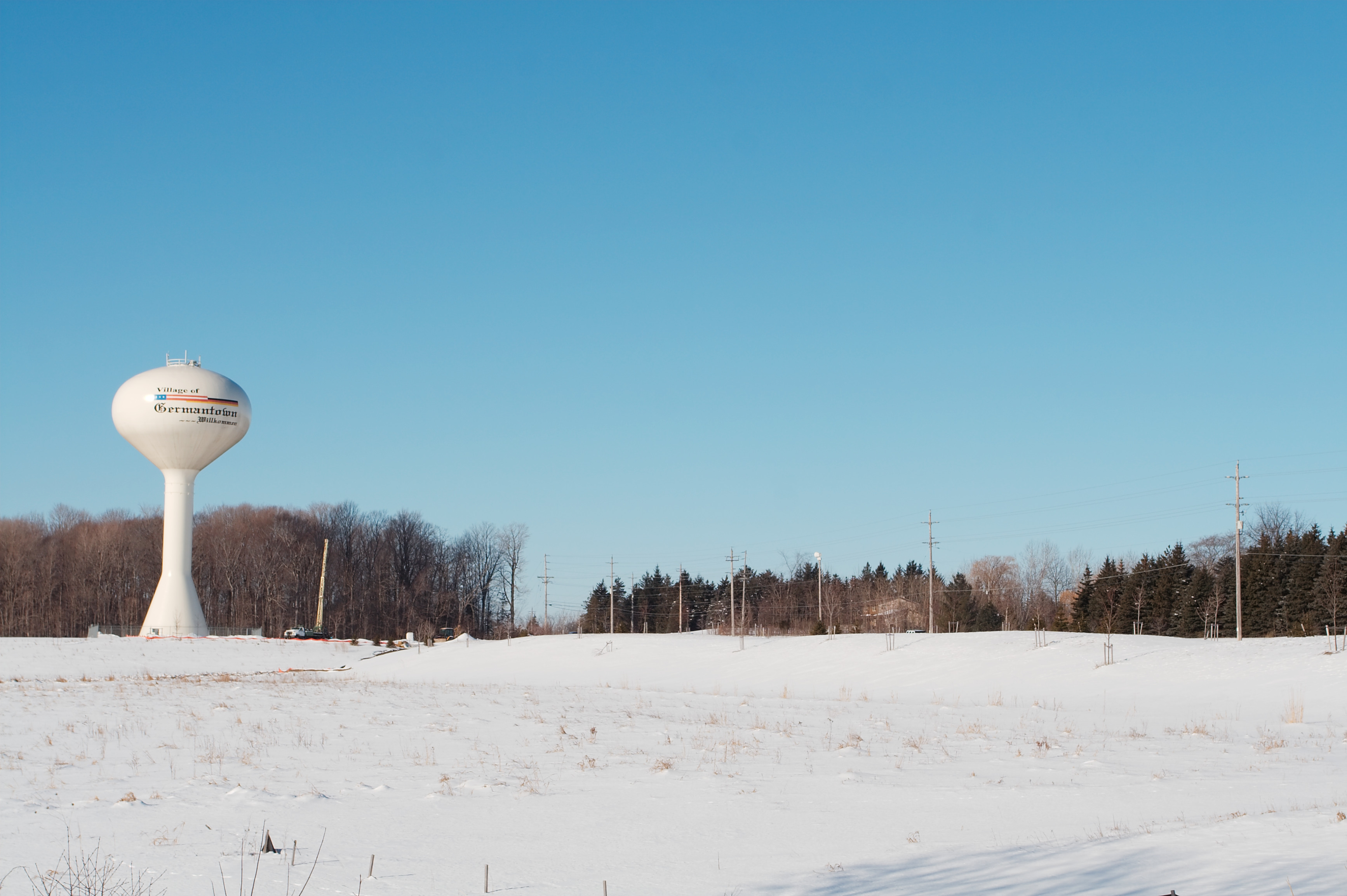
Water tower

Germantown schools are operated by the Germantown School District. The district comprises four elementary schools, one middle school, and one high school, and has about 3,019 students as of October 20, 2008.

=== High school ===
- Germantown High School

=== Middle school ===
- Kennedy Middle School

=== Elementary schools ===
- Amy Belle Elementary

County Line Elementary

- MacArthur Elementary
- Rockfield Elementary

Bethlehem Lutheran School, a grade school of the Wisconsin Evangelical Lutheran Synod, has their North Campus in Germantown.

St. Boniface School, a Catholic grade school, is located on the corner of Goldendale and Freistadt Roads in Germantown.

== Notable people ==
- KK Arnold, American basketball player
- Jesse Kremer, politician and firefighter
- Jacob Leicht, politician and farmer
- John F. Schwalbach, politician and businessman
- Jesse Thielke, Greco-Roman wrestler at the 2016 Summer Olympics
