= Jacob Leicht =

Jacob Leicht may refer to:

- Jake Leicht, American football halfback
- Jacob Leicht (politician), American farmer and politician in Wisconsin
