= Wayne, Wisconsin =

Wayne is the name of some places in the U.S. state of Wisconsin:

- Wayne, Lafayette County, Wisconsin, a town
- Wayne, Washington County, Wisconsin, a town
- Wayne (community), Wisconsin, an unincorporated community
