= Christ Evangelical Church =

Historic church in Wisconsin, United States

- U.S. National Register of Historic Places
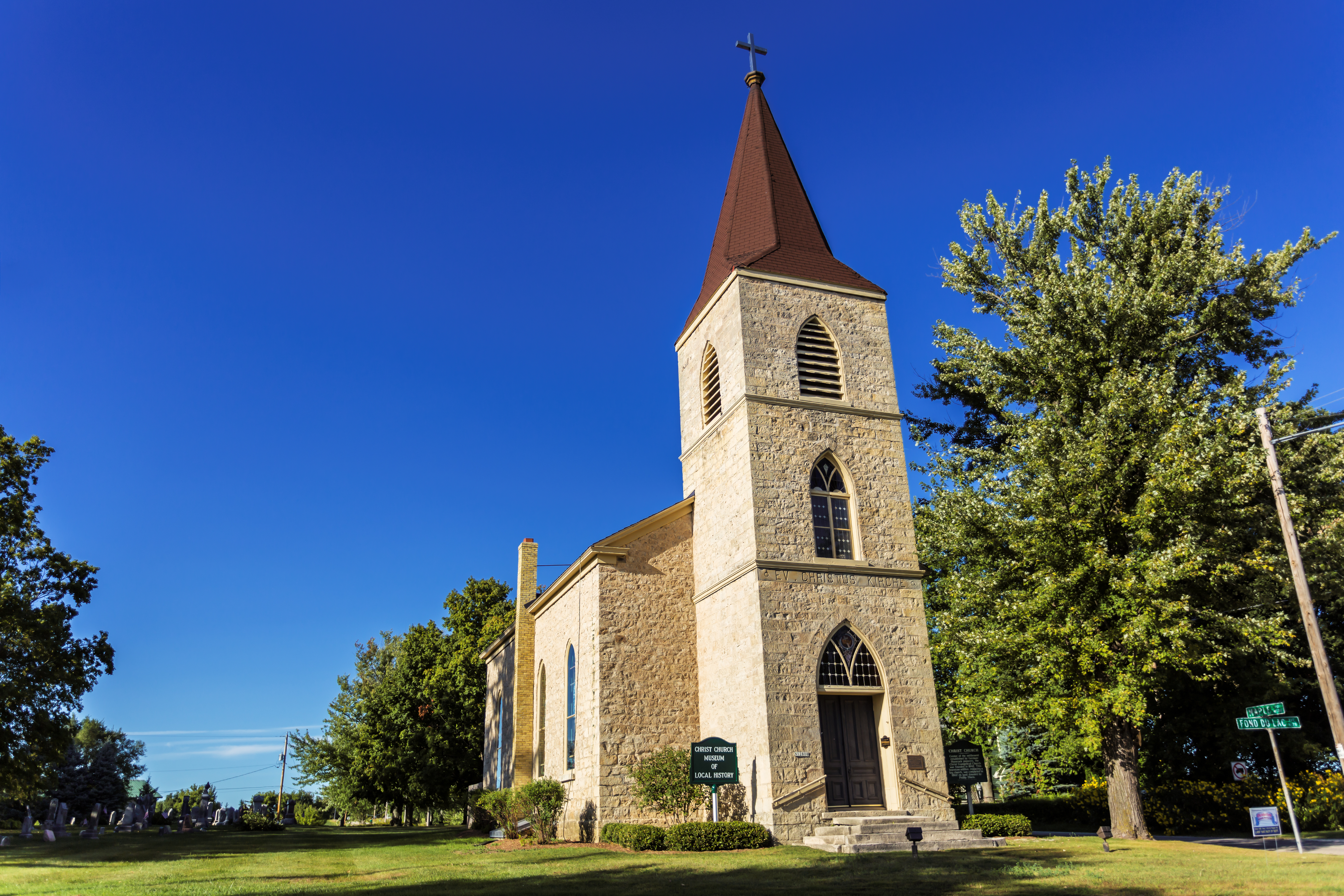
- Christ Evangelical Church
- Nearest city: Germantown, Wisconsin
- Coordinates: 43°15′2″N 88°9′19″W
- Area: less than one acre
- Built: 1862
- Architectural style: Gothic Revival
- NRHP reference No.: 83004324
- Added to NRHP: November 9, 1983

Christ Evangelical Church is a historic church building in Germantown, Wisconsin, United States. It was built in 1862 and was added to the National Register of Historic Places in 1983. The building is now operated as the Christ Church Museum of Local History by the Germantown Historical Society.
