= Germantown, Washington County, Wisconsin =

Town in Washington County, Wisconsin

Germantown, Wisconsin
- Town
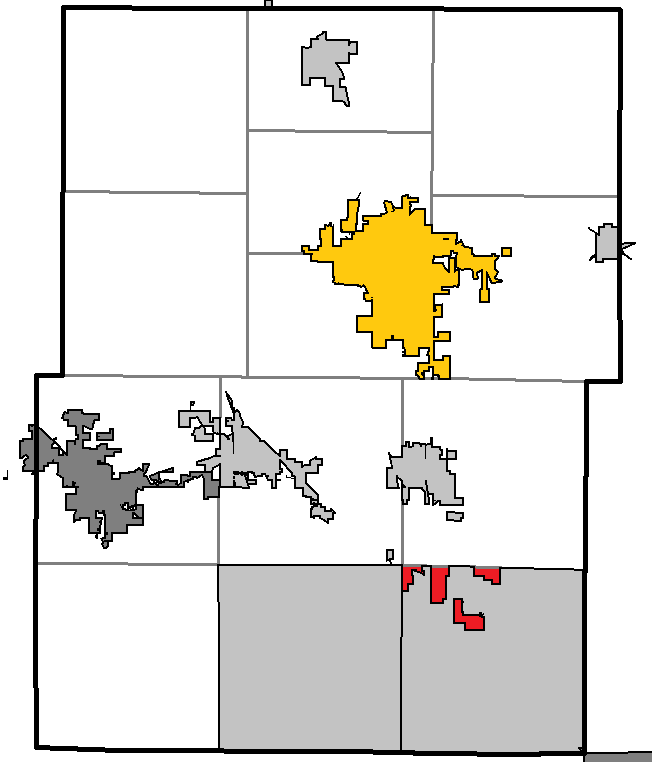
- Location of Germantown, within Washington County
- Coordinates: 43°15′50″N 88°8′33″W
- Country: United States
- State: Wisconsin
- County: Washington
- Incorporated: January 21, 1846; 180 years ago

Area
  - Total: 1.7 sq mi (4.5 km^{2})
  - Land: 1.7 sq mi (4.5 km^{2})
  - Water: 0 sq mi (0.0 km^{2})
- Elevation: 932 ft (284 m)

Population (2020)
  - Total: 241
  - Density: 140/sq mi (54/km^{2})
- Time zone: UTC-6 (Central (CST))
  - Summer (DST): UTC-5 (CDT)
- Area code: 262
- FIPS code: 55-28900
- GNIS feature ID: 1583270
- Website: towngermantownwashco.gov

Germantown is a town in Washington County, Wisconsin, United States. The population was 241 at the 2020 census. It is surrounded by the village of Germantown.

== History ==
The land that became Germantown was originally inhabited by Native Americans, including the Potawatomi tribe. The Potawatomi surrendered the land that became Germantown the United States Federal Government in 1833 through the 1833 Treaty of Chicago, which (after being ratified in 1835) required them to leave Wisconsin by 1838. While many Native people moved west of the Mississippi River to Kansas, some chose to remain, and were referred to as "strolling Potawatomi" in contemporary documents because many of them were migrants who subsisted by squatting on their ancestral lands, which were now owned by white settlers. Eventually the Native Americans who evaded forced removal gathered in northern Wisconsin, where they formed the Forest County Potawatomi Community.

The community was originally designated as the Wisconsin Territory's "Town Nine," making it the oldest settlement in Washington County. Beginning in the 1840s, many German immigrants—particularly from the region of Hesse—settled in the area, which led to it being named "Germantown."

The territorial legislature created the Town of Germantown on January 21, 1846, and the first town meeting was on April 7 of the same year. The town included the then-unincorporated communities of Dheinsville, Goldenthal, Kuhberg (later known as Victory Center), Meeker Hill, Rockfield, South Germantown, and Willow Creek.

In the 19th and early 20th centuries, Germantown's economy relied heavily on agriculture, including dairy farming. The southern part of Germantown is rich in Silurian limestone, which was quarried beginning in the 1870s, particularly in the Rockfield and South Germantown areas. South Germantown was a stop on the Chicago, Milwaukee, and St. Paul starting in the late 19th century, and the hamlet grew and prospered because of its rail connects to other communities.

In 1927, South Germantown incorporated as the Village of Germantown out of some of the town's land but was significantly smaller than it is in the 21st century.

From July 1944 until January 1946, the hamlet of Rockfield—then in the Town of Germantown—was the site of Camp Rockfield, an Allied prisoner of war camp that held 500 German prisoners of war, including captured members of the Afrika Korps and many soldiers captured at the Battle of Cherbourg. The prisoners had originally been held at Fort Sheridan, north of Chicago, but were transferred camps in rural Wisconsin, such as the one at Rockfield, to work in agriculture. The prisoners lived in a barracks that had originally been built as a warehouse for the local Rockfield Canning Company, where many prisoners worked as pea packers. Other POWs were transported to work sites throughout Ozaukee and Washington counties, including the Pick Manufacturing Company in West Bend and the Fromm Bros., Nieman & Co. Fox Ranch in northern Mequon.

In 1963, Milwaukee annexed a small parcel in the southeastern part of the Town of Germantown to expand a landfill. Residents feared that Milwaukee would soon annex more of the town. As a defensive measure, the Village of Germantown annexed all of the surrounding unincorporated hamlets, which encompassed most of the town's territory. At the time of the 1963 annexation, the Village of Germantown grew to an area of approximately 24 square miles. The village annexed more land in 1965 and 1976, reducing the town four non-contiguous parcels with a total area of 1.7 square miles.

== Geography ==
According to the United States Census Bureau, the town has a total area of 1.7 square miles (4.5 km^{2}), all land.

== Demographics ==
As of the census of 2000, there were 278 people, 89 households, and 76 families residing in the town. The population density was 160.2 people per square mile (61.7/km^{2}). There were 94 housing units at an average density of 54.2 per square mile (20.9/km^{2}). The racial makeup of the town was 99.28% White and 0.72% Black or African American. 0.00% of the population were Hispanic or Latino of any race.

There were 89 households, out of which 47.2% had children under the age of 18 living with them, 75.3% were married couples living together, 6.7% had a female householder with no husband present, and 13.5% were non-families. 11.2% of all households were made up of individuals, and 10.1% had someone living alone who was 65 years of age or older. The average household size was 3.12 and the average family size was 3.40.

In the town, the population was spread out, with 30.2% under the age of 18, 7.6% from 18 to 24, 28.4% from 25 to 44, 22.7% from 45 to 64, and 11.2% who were 65 years of age or older. The median age was 37 years. For every 100 females, there were 98.6 males. For every 100 females age 18 and over, there were 98.0 males.

The median income for a household in the town was $75,000, and the median income for a family was $75,159. Males had a median income of $53,750 versus $27,750 for females. The per capita income for the town was $25,694. About 2.2% of families and 3.9% of the population were below the poverty line, including 4.3% of those under the age of eighteen and none of those 65 or over.

== Education ==
The town is served by the Germantown School District, which has four elementary schools, one middle school, and one high school. Enrollment was 3,939 as of October 20, 2008. Jeff Holmes is the superintendent.

=== Elementary schools ===
- Amy Belle Elementary
- County Line Elementary
- MacArthur Elementary
- Rockfield Elementary
- Bethlehem Lutheran School

=== Middle school ===
- Kennedy Middle School

=== High school ===
- Germantown High School
