= Kohlsville, Wisconsin =

- Unincorporated community
- Location within Wisconsin Location within the United States
- Country: United States
- State: Wisconsin
- County: Washington
- Elevation: 1,007 ft (307 m)
- Time zone: UTC-6 (Central (CST))
  - Summer (DST): UTC-5 (CDT)
- Area code: 262
- GNIS feature ID: 1567604

Kohlsville is an unincorporated community in the town of Wayne in Washington County, Wisconsin, United States. in the outside of the Milwaukee Metropolitan Area. The Kohlsville River flows through the community and is dammed, creating the Kohlsville Millpond.
