= Jacob Leicht (politician) =

American politician

- Born: May 30, 1876
- Died: April 12, 1941 (aged 64)
- Education: Valparaiso University
- Occupations: farmer, politician
- Spouse: Ruth Hollencamp
- Children: 6

Jacob Leicht (May 30, 1876 – April 12, 1941) was an American farmer and politician.

Born in South Germantown, Washington County, Wisconsin, Leicht went to Northern Illinois Normal School and Valparaiso University. He was a farmer. He married Ruth Hollencamp, with whom he had six children. Leicht served as chairman of the town of Germantown, school district officer, and served on the Washington County Board of Supervisors and was chairman of the county board. Leicht served in the Wisconsin State Assembly in 1925 and was a Republican. Leicht became a member of the board of the Milwaukee Co-Operative Milk Producers' Association in 1940. He died at his home in Germantown, Wisconsin.
