= Allenton State Wildlife Area =

Wildlife Area in Wisconsin, US

- IUCN category V (protected landscape/seascape)
- Location within Wisconsin Location within the United States
- Location: Washington County, Wisconsin, United States
- Nearest city: Saint Lawrence, Wisconsin
- Coordinates: 43.4°N 88.33°W
- Area: 1,160 acres (4.7 km^{2})
- Governing body: Wisconsin Department of Natural Resources
- Website: Official website

The Allenton State Wildlife Area is a wildlife area in Wisconsin along the East Branch of the Rock River (Mississippi River) tributary of the Mississippi River in western Washington County, Wisconsin. The area was once a glacial lake and is now a wooded bottomland. It is popular with birders and is part of the Great Wisconsin Birding and Nature Trail. Theresa Marsh and its state wildlife area is to the park's north.

The wildlife area includes habitat used by sandhill crane, marsh wren, swamp sparrow and snow geese. Rare species include the rough-legged hawk, northern harrier, bobolink and American bittern.

== See also ==
- Theresa Marsh Wildlife Area
