= Theresa Marsh =

Protected area in Wisconsin, US

- Theresa Marsh Wildlife area
- IUCN category V (protected landscape/seascape)
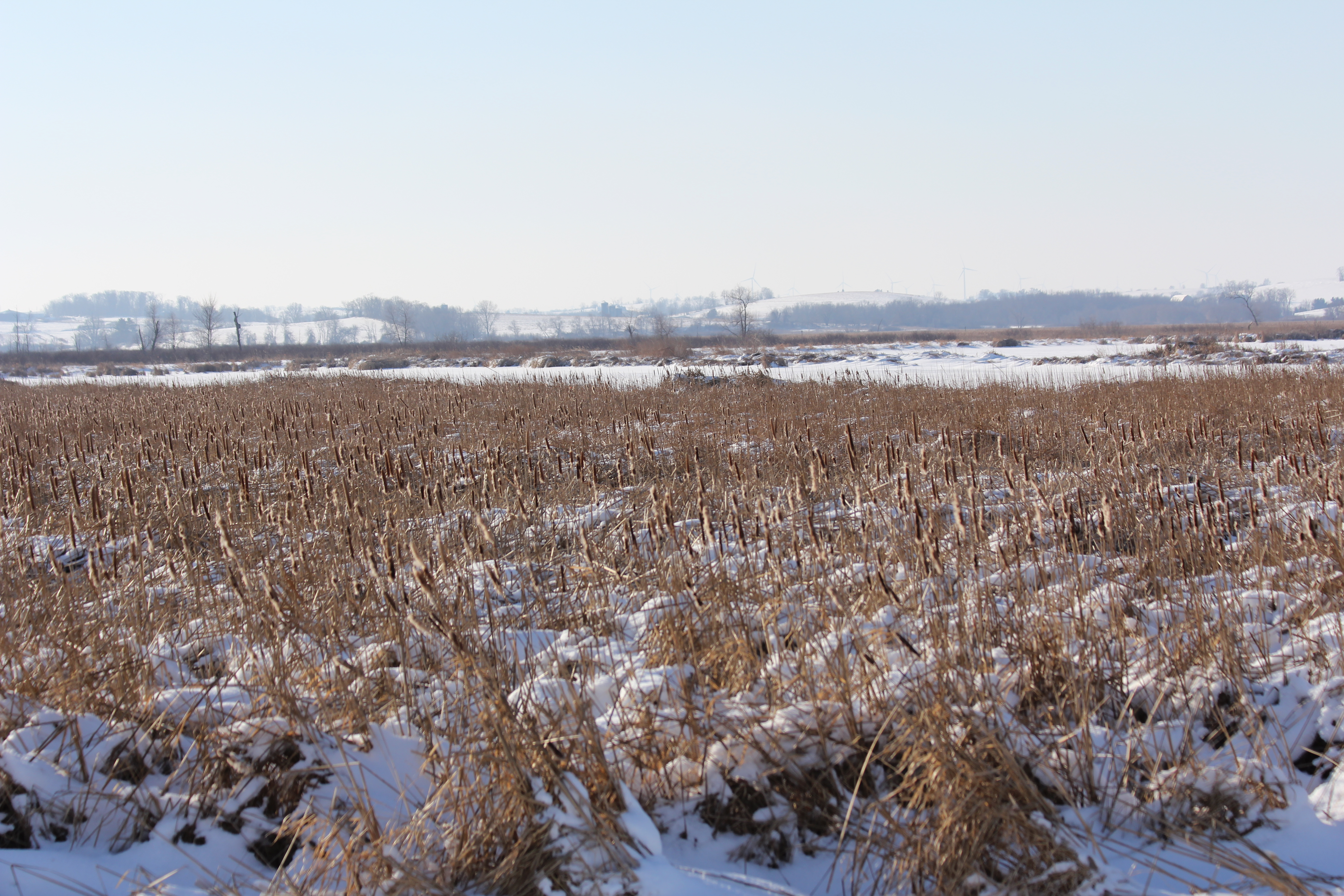
- Theresa Marsh in winter from Highway 28

- Location within Wisconsin Location within the United States
- Location: Washington and Dodge counties, Wisconsin
- Nearest city: Mayville, Wisconsin
- Coordinates: 43.515°N 88.407°W
- Area: 5,990 acres (24.2 km^{2})
- Established: 1968
- Governing body: Wisconsin Department of Natural Resources

Theresa Marsh is located near Theresa, Wisconsin, in northern Washington County and eastern Dodge County. The marsh is the starting point for the Rock River, a tributary of the Mississippi River, and the marsh is an important stopping point for migratory birds. The Theresa Marsh Wildlife Area is a 5,990-acre (2,420 ha) state park that includes grassland, cattail, brush marsh, woodlands, agricultural land, seasonally flooded wetlands, and permanent wetlands. There are several campgrounds in the area. The Allenton State Wildlife Area is nearby.

The area was home to tamarack forests and was used by Pottawatomie Indians for trapping. Most of the forest was cut during a period of settlement by whites, and a corduroy road was built across the marsh. It is now paved as Wisconsin State Highway 28. Solomon Juneau settled the area in 1852 and named the village after his mother, Theresa. He ran a trading post, constructed a grain mill, and operated a dam to provide water power for a saw mill. The area continued to be developed for agriculture in the decades that followed. After the agricultural businesses failed because of flooding, the Wisconsin Department of Natural Resources completed its land acquisitions, begun in 1948, in 1964. Dikes were constructed, along with water control features operated to provide waterfowl habitat. Hunting is allowed in season.

The Kohlsville River flows through the southern part of the marsh and joins with the East Branch Rock River there.

== See also ==
- Allenton State Wildlife Area
