= Dheinsville, Wisconsin =

Coordinates: 43°15′00″N 88°08′34″W

Dheinsville is an important historical settlement (modern-day neighborhood) in the village of Germantown, Wisconsin, Washington County, United States. Dheinsville is located at the intersection of Highway 167 (Holy Hill Road), State Highway 145, and Maple Road.

== History ==
Dheinsville was established in 1842 by the Philip Dhein family. The neighborhood contains original half-timber buildings (fachwerk), reflecting the building construction patterns of the early pioneers from the Hunsrück area of Germany. The Bast Bell Museum consists of log, quarried limestone, brick, and clapboard buildings dating from early settlement through the Victorian period. It was named for Philip Dhein who emigrated from Germany in 1842. The post office was established in July 1855 with Adam Staats as the first postmaster.
