= West Bend (town), Wisconsin =

Town in Washington County, Wisconsin

West Bend, Wisconsin
- Town
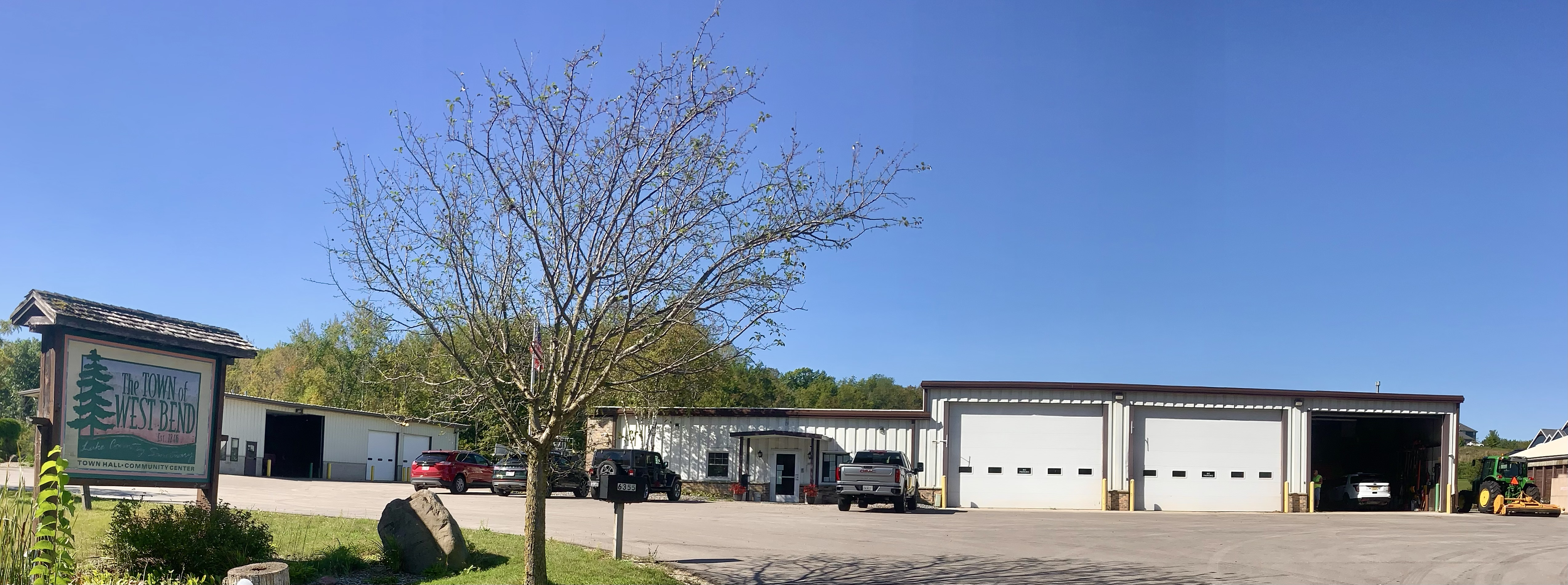
- Town hall

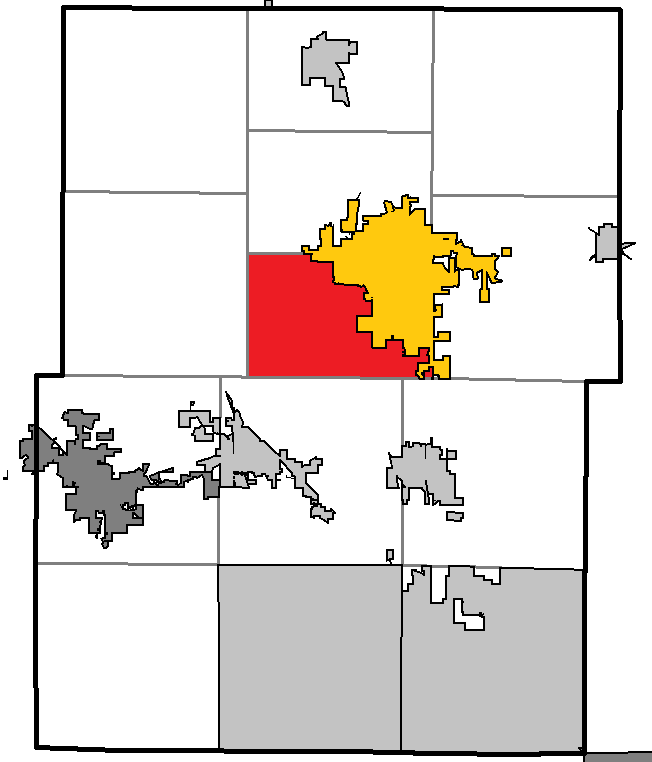
- Location of the Town of West Bend, within Washington County
- Coordinates: 43°23′45″N 88°13′55″W
- Country: United States
- State: Wisconsin
- County: Washington

Government
  - Chairman: Troy Zagel
  - Town Board: Supervisors: Mark Wagor; Steve Lindley
  - Clerk: Julie Ihlenfeld

Area
  - Total: 18 sq mi (47 km^{2})
  - Land: 16.1 sq mi (41.8 km^{2})
  - Water: 2.0 sq mi (5.2 km^{2})
- Elevation: 1,093 ft (333 m)

Population (2020)
  - Total: 4,441
  - Density: 275/sq mi (106/km^{2})
- Time zone: UTC-6 (Central (CST))
  - Summer (DST): UTC-5 (CDT)
- Area code: 262
- FIPS code: 55-85375
- GNIS feature ID: 1584400
- Website: www.townofwestbend.com

West Bend is a town in Washington County, Wisconsin, United States. The population was 4,441 at the 2020 census. The City of West Bend is located partially within the town. The unincorporated community of Nabob is located in the town.

== History ==
Northeastern Washington County's earliest known inhabitants were pre-Columbian Mound Builders, who constructed effigy mounds in the area sometime between 650 CE and 1300 CE. They were semi-nomadic and survived by hunting, fishing, and gathering wild plants. They made pottery and constructed tools from bone, wood, stone, and occasionally copper. They built effigy mounds shaped like mammals, reptiles, birds and other creatures, both real and mythical, as well as conical, oval, and linear mounds, some of which contain human burials. Some mounds in the West Bend area were destroyed by white settlers to create farm fields, but several dozen survive and are listed on the National Register of Historic Places as the Washington County "Island" Effigy Mound District, which includes the Lizard Mound County Park site in nearby Farmington as well as several privately owned sites.

In the early 19th century when the first white settlers arrived in Southeastern Wisconsin, the Potawatomi and Menominee Indians inhabited the land now occupied by the Town of West Bend. In 1831, the Menominee surrendered their claims to the land to the United States Federal Government through the Treaty of Washington. The Potawatomi surrendered their land claims in 1833 through the 1833 Treaty of Chicago, which (after being ratified in 1835) required them to leave the area by 1838. While many Native people moved west of the Mississippi River to Kansas, some chose to remain, and were referred to as "strolling Potawatomi" in contemporary documents because many of them were migrants who subsisted by squatting on their ancestral lands, which were now owned by white settlers. In the mid-1800s, there was a large Native American village on the shore of Silver Lake in the Town of West Bend. Eventually the Potawatomi who evaded forced removal gathered in northern Wisconsin, where they formed the Forest County Potawatomi Community.

In 1845, the Wisconsin Territorial Legislature authorized the construction of a road to connect Fond du Lac and Milwaukee with a new settlement near the halfway point to provide provisions and overnight accommodations for travelers. Byron Kilbourn, James Kneeland, and Erastus B. Wolcott were the commissioners tasked with constructing the new settlement, and they decided to locate it on a westward bend in the Milwaukee River—the present-day location of the City of West Bend—because of the river's potential as a power source for mills. By the end of 1845, they had purchased eight eighty-acre tracts of land along the river, and invited local landowner E. N. Higgins to join their venture as well. In 1846, Wolcott constructed a dam and a sawmill in the new community, and in 1848, he constructed a gristmill.

The Wisconsin Territorial legislature created the Town of West Bend on January 20, 1846. At the time, the town included land that is now part of the City of West Bend, as well as the neighboring towns of Barton, Farmington, Kewaskum, and Trenton.

In the 1840s and early 1850s, Washington County included the land along Lake Michigan that is now Ozaukee County, Wisconsin. Port Washington served as the county seat, which was controversial at the time. West Bend, Cedarburg, and Grafton vied for position of Washington County seat and the material advantages it would entail. In 1850, the Wisconsin legislature voted to bisected Washington County into northern and southern counties, with Port Washington and Cedarburg as the county seats, respectively. County residents failed to ratify the bill, because there were voting irregularities in some communities. In 1853 the legislature instead bisected the county into eastern and western sections, creating Ozaukee County. Port Washington became the seat of the new county, and the Washington County seat moved to the town of West Bend. The bisection was controversial. When Washington County officials from West Bend arrived in Port Washington to collect relevant county records, they were run out of town, and Ozaukee County officials refused to hand over the records for several months.

A railroad station was constructed in West Bend in 1873, bringing new residents, businesses and economic connections into the community. The future City of West Bend's location on the river, its status as the seat of county government, and its rail connections caused the city to grow and expand in the 1870s and 1880s. In March 1885, the City of West Bend incorporated from some of the town's land.

The City of West Bend experienced dramatic population growth during the post–World War II economic expansion. As automobiles became more commonplace, more people moved to the city and commuted for work, taking advantage of new roads such as U.S. Route 45, which connected the West Bend area to Milwaukee. Between 1950 and 1990 the population more than tripled from 6,849 to 23,916, and the city annexed land from the Town of West Bend, as well as the neighboring towns of Barton and Trenton.

== Geography ==
According to the United States Census Bureau, the town has a total area of 18.1 square miles (47 km^{2}), of which 16.1 square miles (42 km^{2}) is land and 2 square miles (5.2 km^{2}) (10.98%) is water.

== Demographics ==
As of the census of 2000, there were 4,834 people, 1,611 households, and 1,314 families residing in the town. The population density was 299.5 people per square mile (115.6 people/km^{2}). There were 1,975 housing units at an average density of 122.4 per square mile (47.3/km^{2}). The racial makeup of the town was 98.97% White, 0.02% Black or African American, 0.19% Native American, 0.27% Asian, 0.06% Pacific Islander, 0.04% from other races, and 0.46% from two or more races. 0.56% of the population were Hispanic or Latino of any race.

There were 1,611 households, out of which 36.1% had children under the age of 18 living with them, 76.4% were married couples living together, 3% had a female householder with no husband present, and 18.4% were non-families. 16% of all households were made up of individuals, and 6.1% had someone living alone who was 65 years of age or older. The average household size was 2.74 and the average family size was 3.07.

In the town, the population was spread out, with 24% under the age of 18, 4.9% from 18 to 24, 25.4% from 25 to 44, 26.9% from 45 to 64, and 18.8% who were 65 years of age or older. The median age was 42 years. For every 100 females, there were 97.6 males. For every 100 females age 18 and over, there were 92.8 males.

The median income for a household in the town was $73,333, and the median income for a family was $79,728. Males had a median income of $51,757 versus $28,371 for females. The per capita income for the town was $33,097. About 1.7% of families and 1.8% of the population were below the poverty line, including 1% of those under age 18 and 2.4% of those age 65 or over.

== See also ==
- Cedar Community, West Bend, Wisconsin.

== Sources ==
- Quickert, Carl (1912). Washington County, Wisconsin: Past and Present. Chicago: S. J. Clarke.
