= Native Land Digital =

Canadian cartography organization

Native Land Digital is a Canadian non-profit website and mobile app that has created a searchable global map of Indigenous territories, languages, and treaties. The website, Native-Land.ca, was created in 2015 by Victor Temprano and incorporated as a non-profit in 2018. As of 2023, Tanya Ruka (a Māori Indigenous artist and designer) is the executive director. The group says that it seeks "to create and foster conversations about the history of colonialism, Indigenous ways of knowing, and settler-Indigenous relations".

== Functionality ==
Native Land Digital users can browse the map, or search for a country, subnational division, town, or post code to see which Indigenous peoples are native to which region. Each Indigenous nation listed includes links to related readings.

The website is built on MapBox and WordPress.

== See also ==
- Lands inhabited by indigenous peoples
- Native Americans in the United States
- List of federally recognized tribes in the contiguous United States
- List of organizations that self-identify as Native American tribes
- First Nations in Canada
- Indigenous land rights in Australia
