= Kettl Commission =

The "Kettl Commission," formally the (Wisconsin) "Governor’s Blue-Ribbon Commission on State-Local Partnerships for the 21st Century," was a bipartisan 1999-2000 blue ribbon commission, chaired by University of Wisconsin–Madison political scientist Donald F. Kettl, charged by then-Governor Tommy Thompson with studying and reporting back to the governor on how Wisconsin government should be re-structured. It was instructed to think of itself as a miniature constitutional convention.

The 133-page final report was issued in January 2001, with 139 recommendations, some of them quite bold. The Commission concluded the state should provide more aid to villages, towns, cities and counties which collaborate on a regional basis to provide taxpayers better service and spur economic growth, and that the state should ultimately assume responsibility for defining and financing social service and criminal justice programs at the county level, including child welfare, circuit courts and juvenile justice. Like those of most such commissions, the conclusions and recommendations have been only spottily addressed.
