= Browns Lake, Wisconsin =

Census-designated place in Wisconsin, United States

- CDP
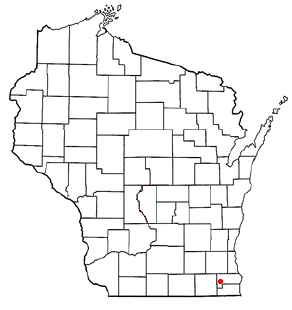
- Location of Browns Lake, Wisconsin
- Coordinates: 42°41′15″N 88°14′14″W
- Country: United States
- State: Wisconsin
- County: Racine

Area
  - Total: 2.8 sq mi (7.2 km^{2})
  - Land: 2.2 sq mi (5.6 km^{2})
  - Water: 0.62 sq mi (1.6 km^{2})
- Elevation: 781 ft (238 m)

Population (2020)
  - Total: 1,879
  - Density: 870/sq mi (340/km^{2})
- Time zone: UTC-6 (Central (CST))
  - Summer (DST): UTC-5 (CDT)
- Area code: 262
- FIPS code: 55-10425
- GNIS feature ID: 1867654

Browns Lake is a census-designated place (CDP) in Racine County, Wisconsin, United States, around a lake of the same name. The population was 1,879 at the 2020 census. It is politically a part of the town of Burlington, along with Bohners Lake.

== Geography ==
Browns Lake is located at 42°41′15″N 88°14′14″W (42.687609, -88.237143).

According to the United States Census Bureau, the CDP has a total area of 2.8 square miles (7.2 km^{2}), of which 2.2 square miles (5.6 km^{2}) is land and 0.6 square mile (1.6 km^{2}) (21.94%) is water.

== Demographics ==
Historical population
Census	Pop.	Note	%±
2000	1,933		—
2010	2,039		5.5%
2020	1,879		−7.8%
U.S. Decennial Census

=== 2020 census ===
As of the 2020 census, Browns Lake had a population of 1,879. The median age was 47.7 years. 16.9% of residents were under the age of 18 and 22.2% of residents were 65 years of age or older. For every 100 females there were 95.1 males, and for every 100 females age 18 and over there were 95.2 males age 18 and over.

79.0% of residents lived in urban areas, while 21.0% lived in rural areas.

There were 841 households in Browns Lake, of which 23.2% had children under the age of 18 living in them. Of all households, 57.4% were married-couple households, 16.9% were households with a male householder and no spouse or partner present, and 16.5% were households with a female householder and no spouse or partner present. About 23.2% of all households were made up of individuals and 10.9% had someone living alone who was 65 years of age or older.

There were 1,057 housing units, of which 20.4% were vacant. The homeowner vacancy rate was 1.6% and the rental vacancy rate was 3.6%.

Racial composition as of the 2020 census
Race	Number	Percent
White	1,724	91.8%
Black or African American	10	0.5%
American Indian and Alaska Native	11	0.6%
Asian	8	0.4%
Native Hawaiian and Other Pacific Islander	0	0.0%
Some other race	24	1.3%
Two or more races	102	5.4%
Hispanic or Latino (of any race)	87	4.6%

=== 2000 census ===
As of the census of 2000, there were 1,933 people, 745 households, and 545 families residing in the CDP. The population density was 892.6 people per square mile (343.9/km^{2}). There were 975 housing units at an average density of 450.2/sq mi (173.5/km^{2}). The racial makeup of the CDP was 96.53% White, 0.16% African American, 0.05% Native American, 0.88% Asian, 1.55% from other races, and 0.83% from two or more races. Hispanic or Latino of any race were 2.85% of the population.

There were 745 households, out of which 31.3% had children under the age of 18 living with them, 61.5% were married couples living together, 7.9% had a female householder with no husband present, and 26.8% were non-families. 21.5% of all households were made up of individuals, and 8.6% had someone living alone who was 65 years of age or older. The average household size was 2.51 and the average family size was 2.92.

In the CDP, the population was spread out, with 23.2% under the age of 18, 6.9% from 18 to 24, 28.8% from 25 to 44, 28.1% from 45 to 64, and 13.0% who were 65 years of age or older. The median age was 40 years. For every 100 females, there were 101.8 males. For every 100 females age 18 and over, there were 100.3 males.

The median income for a household in the CDP was $59,563, and the median income for a family was $65,714. Males had a median income of $44,940 versus $26,116 for females. The per capita income for the CDP was $28,368. None of the families and 1.3% of the population were living below the poverty line, including no under eighteens and 6.8% of those over 64.
