= Bohners Lake, Wisconsin =

Census-designated place in Wisconsin, United States

- CDP
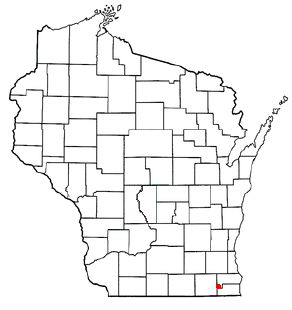
- Location of Bohners Lake, Wisconsin
- Coordinates: 42°37′27″N 88°17′8″W
- Country: United States
- State: Wisconsin
- County: Racine

Area
  - Total: 2.3 sq mi (6.0 km^{2})
  - Land: 2.0 sq mi (5.3 km^{2})
  - Water: 0.27 sq mi (0.7 km^{2})
- Elevation: 846 ft (258 m)

Population (2020)
  - Total: 2,374
  - Density: 1,200/sq mi (450/km^{2})
- Time zone: UTC-6 (Central (CST))
  - Summer (DST): UTC-5 (CDT)
- Area code: 262
- FIPS code: 55-08625
- GNIS feature ID: 1867652

Bohners Lake is a census-designated place (CDP) in Racine County, Wisconsin, United States. Its first syllable is pronounced as in "bone". The population of the CDP was 2,374 at the 2020 census. It is politically part of the Town of Burlington, together with Browns Lake. There has been discussion of incorporating Bohners Lake as a village to prevent annexation by the City of Burlington. It was named for Antony Bohner, a French immigrant who established a resort on the lake of the same name.

== Geography ==
Bohners Lake is located at 42°37′27″N 88°17′8″W (42.624228, -88.285653).

According to the United States Census Bureau, the CDP has a total area of 2.3 square miles (6.0 km^{2}), of which 2.0 square miles (5.3 km^{2}) is land and 0.3 square mile (0.7 km^{2}) (12.12%) is water.

== Demographics ==
Historical population
Census	Pop.	Note	%±
2000	1,952		—
2010	2,444		25.2%
2020	2,374		−2.9%
U.S. Decennial Census

As of the census of 2000, there were 1,952 people, 704 households, and 532 families residing in the CDP. The population density was 960.3 people per square mile (371.3/km^{2}). There were 871 housing units at an average density of 428.5/sq mi (165.7/km^{2}). The racial makeup of the CDP was 98.51% White, 0.05% Native American, 0.10% Asian, 0.46% from other races, and 0.87% from two or more races. Hispanic or Latino of any race were 1.95% of the population.

There were 704 households, out of which 39.6% had children under the age of 18 living with them, 64.3% were married couples living together, 7.4% had a female householder with no husband present, and 24.3% were non-families. 18.8% of all households were made up of individuals, and 8.5% had someone living alone who was 65 years of age or older. The average household size was 2.77 and the average family size was 3.19.

In the CDP, the population was spread out, with 28.6% under the age of 18, 6.5% from 18 to 24, 32.3% from 25 to 44, 22.8% from 45 to 64, and 9.7% who were 65 years of age or older. The median age was 35 years. For every 100 females, there were 100.8 males. For every 100 females age 18 and over, there were 99.9 males.

The median income for a household in the CDP was $56,280, and the median income for a family was $60,820. Males had a median income of $34,865 versus $27,151 for females. The per capita income for the CDP was $19,584. About 1.4% of families and 3.2% of the population were below the poverty line, including 2.8% of those under age 18 and 4.8% of those age 65 or over.
