= Nabob, Wisconsin =

- Unincorporated community
- Location within Wisconsin Location within the United States
- Coordinates: 43°25′13″N 88°16′15″W
- Country: United States
- State: Wisconsin
- County: Washington
- Elevation: 1,178 ft (359 m)
- Time zone: UTC-6 (Central (CST))
  - Summer (DST): UTC-5 (CDT)
- Area code: 262
- GNIS feature ID: 1570093

Nabob is an unincorporated community located in the town of West Bend, Washington County, Wisconsin, United States. Nabob is located near Wisconsin Highway 33 and Wisconsin Highway 144, 4.5 miles (7.2 km) west of the city of West Bend. It was the site of St. Mathias Catholic Church (the graveyard of which is still extant), and is sometimes called St. Mathias for that reason. There was still a Nabob post office in 1901.
