= Rockfield, Wisconsin =

Hamlet in Washington County, Wisconsin, and neighborhood of the Village of Germantown

- Location within Wisconsin Location within the United States
- Coordinates: 43°15′27″N 88°07′34″W
- Country: United States
- State: Wisconsin
- County: Washington
- Elevation: 909 ft (277 m)
- Time zone: UTC-6 (Central (CST))
  - Summer (DST): UTC-5 (CDT)
- Area code: 262
- GNIS feature ID: 1572481

Rockfield was a hamlet that was annexed by the Village of Germantown in Washington County, Wisconsin, United States.

== History ==
A post office called Rockfield was established in 1876, and remained in operation until it was discontinued in 1997. The community was named from a nearby field containing marked rocks. The area is rich in Silurian limestone, and beginning in the 1870s quarries and lime kilns operated in the area.

From July 1944 until January 1946, Rockfield was the site of Camp Rockfield, an Allied prisoner of war camp that held 500 German prisoners of war, including captured members of the Afrika Korps and many soldiers captured at the Battle of Cherbourg. The prisoners had originally been held at Fort Sheridan, north of Chicago, but were transferred camps in rural Wisconsin, such as the one at Rockfield, to work in agriculture. The prisoners lived in a barracks that had originally been built as a warehouse for the local Rockfield Canning Company, where many prisoners worked as pea packers. Other POWs were transported to work sites throughout Ozaukee and Washington counties, including the Pick Manufacturing Company in West Bend and the Fromm Bros., Nieman & Co. Fox Ranch in northern Mequon.
