= Wayne, Washington County, Wisconsin =

Town in Washington County, Wisconsin

Wayne, Wisconsin
- Town
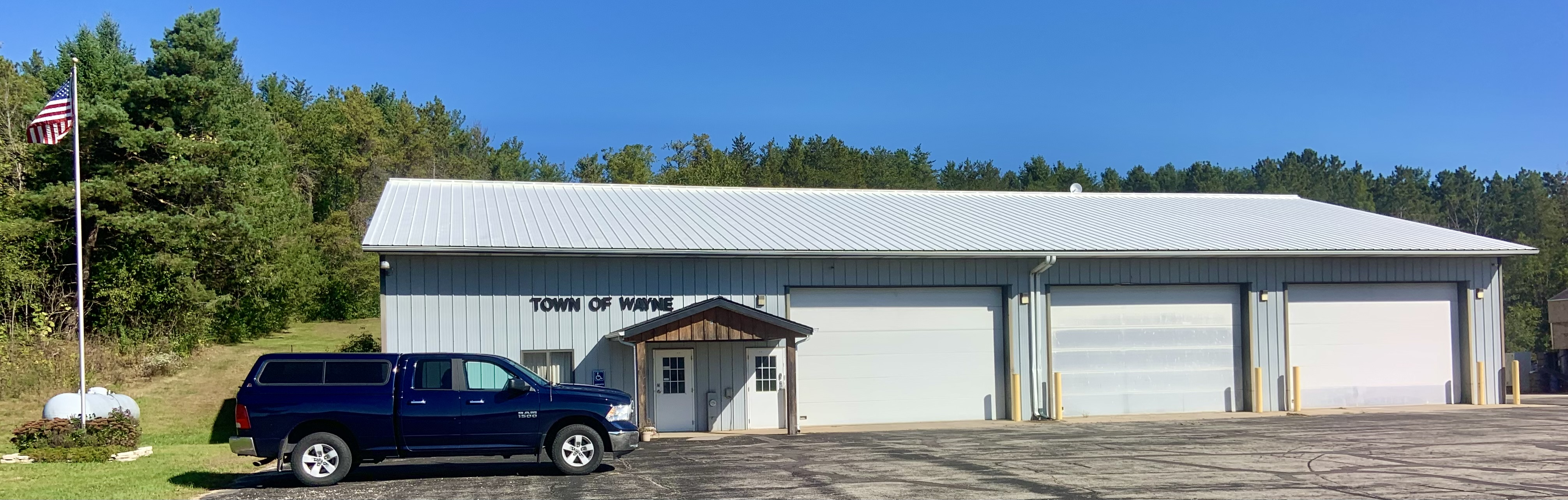
- Town hall

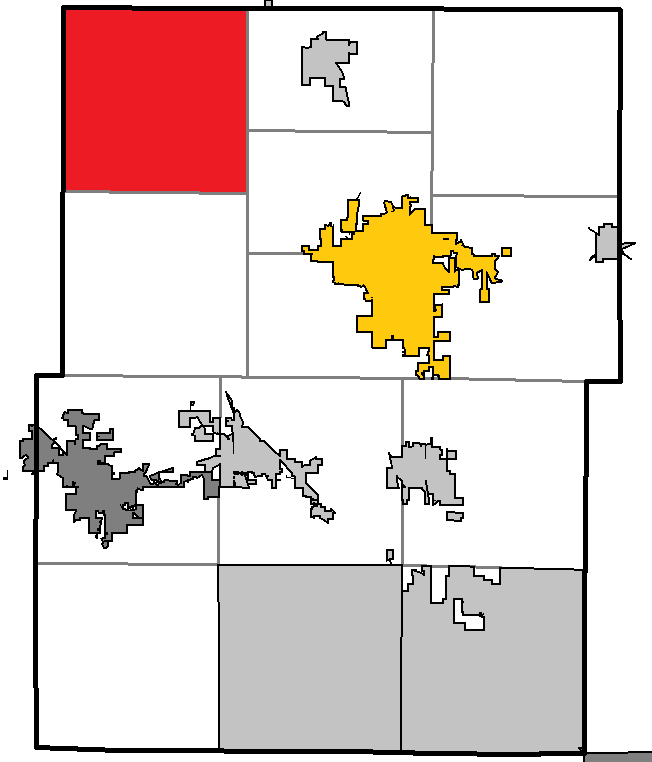
- Location of Wayne, within Washington County, Wisconsin
- Coordinates: 43°30′16″N 88°21′7″W
- Country: United States
- State: Wisconsin
- County: Washington

Area
  - Total: 35.8 sq mi (92.7 km^{2})
  - Land: 35.8 sq mi (92.7 km^{2})
  - Water: 0 sq mi (0.0 km^{2})
- Elevation: 991 ft (302 m)

Population (2020)
  - Total: 2,182
  - Density: 61.0/sq mi (23.5/km^{2})
- Time zone: UTC-6 (Central (CST))
  - Summer (DST): UTC-5 (CDT)
- Area code: 262
- FIPS code: 55-84900
- GNIS feature ID: 1584389
- Website: townofwayne.org

Wayne is a town in Washington County, Wisconsin, United States. The population was 2,182 at the 2020 census. The unincorporated communities of Kohlsville and Wayne are located in the town.

== History ==
In the early 19th century when the first white settlers arrived in Southeastern Wisconsin, the Potawatomi and Menominee Native Americans inhabited the land now occupied by the Town of Wayne. In 1831, the Menominee surrendered their claims to the land to the United States Federal Government through the Treaty of Washington. The Potawatomi surrendered their land claims in 1833 through the 1833 Treaty of Chicago, which (after being ratified in 1833) required them to leave the area by 1838. While many Native people moved west of the Mississippi River to Kansas, some chose to remain, and were referred to as "strolling Potawatomi" in contemporary documents because many of them were migrants who subsisted by squatting on their ancestral lands, which were now owned by white settlers. Eventually the Native people who evaded forced removal gathered in northern Wisconsin, where they formed the Forest County Potawatomi Community.

The first white settlers arrived in 1846, when the land was part of the Town of Addison and largely covered with dense hardwood forests. The Town of Wayne incorporated on March 11, 1848, and was named for General Anthony Wayne, who served in the American Revolution. The first settlers were mostly Yankees and Irish immigrants, but beginning around 1850 many German immigrants began to settle in the town, and by 1880 the population was almost entirely of German descent.

The town population remained small throughout its history. Unlike neighboring towns, Wayne never had any railroad connections, and the hamlets of Kohlsville, St. Kilians, and Wayne Center remained rural communities that served the local farmers, unlike hamlets in neighboring towns which grew and prospered with construction of new railroads. Beginning in the 1970s, Wayne's population began to increase, nearly doubling from 1,214 in 1970 to 2,169 in 2010. However, as of the 2010s, Wayne has the second-lowest housing density in Washington County, and more than 60 percent of the land is zoned agricultural.

== Geography ==
According to the United States Census Bureau, the town has a total area of 35.8 square miles (92.7 km^{2}), all land.

== Demographics ==
As of the census of 2000, there were 1,727 people, 582 households, and 485 families residing in the town. The population density was 48.2 people per square mile (18.6/km^{2}). There were 597 housing units at an average density of 16.7 per square mile (6.4/km^{2}). The racial makeup of the town was 99.25% White, 0.23% Native American, 0.12% Asian, 0.06% Pacific Islander, and 0.35% from two or more races. Hispanic or Latino of any race were 0.17% of the population.

There were 582 households, out of which 38.5% had children under the age of 18 living with them, 77.3% were married couples living together, 3.8% had a female householder with no husband present, and 16.5% were non-families. 10.8% of all households were made up of individuals, and 3.8% had someone living alone who was 65 years of age or older. The average household size was 2.97 and the average family size was 3.24.

In the town, the population was spread out, with 26.6% under the age of 18, 7.1% from 18 to 24, 32.4% from 25 to 44, 25.3% from 45 to 64, and 8.5% who were 65 years of age or older. The median age was 36 years. For every 100 females, there were 102.5 males. For every 100 females age 18 and over, there were 102.7 males.

The median income for a household in the town was $61,033, and the median income for a family was $64,297. Males had a median income of $41,200 versus $23,889 for females. The per capita income for the town was $21,995. About 0.8% of families and 2.0% of the population were below the poverty line, including none of those under age 18 and 4.8% of those age 65 or over.

== Notable people ==
- Nicholaus Marx, legislator, lived in the town
- Gottlob E. Weiss, legislator, lived in the town

== Sources ==
- Quickert, Carl (1912). Washington County, Wisconsin: Past and Present. Chicago, IL: S. J. Clarke Publishing Company.
