= List of museums in Wisconsin =

This list of museums in Wisconsin encompasses museums defined for this context as institutions (including nonprofit organizations, government entities, and private businesses) that collect and care for objects of cultural, artistic, scientific, or historical interest and make their collections or related exhibits available for public viewing. Also included are non-profit and university art galleries. Museums that exist only in cyberspace (i.e., virtual museums) are not included.

== Museums ==
Name	Location	County	Region	Type	Website/Summary
A World Of Accordions Museum	Superior	Douglas	Lake Superior Northwoods	Music	website, features over 1000 accordions, figurines, and related artifacts, located in the Harrington ARTS Center
Above & Beyond Children's Museum	Sheboygan	Sheboygan	Lake Michigan	Children's	
Adams County Heritage Center	Friendship	Adams	Central Sands Prairie	Historic house	website, operated by the Adams County Historical Society in the historic Gunning–Purves Building, also tours of the late 19th-century period McGowan House
Albany Historical Museum	Albany	Green	Southern Savanna	Local history	
Alexander House Center for Art & History	Port Edwards	Wood	Central Sands Prairie	Multiple	Art gallery and historical museum emphasizing local lumbering and papermaking industries
Alexander Noble House	Fish Creek	Door	Lake Michigan	Historic house	Late-19th-century period house, operated by the Gibraltar Historical Association
Alma Area Museum	Alma	Buffalo	Mississippi/Chippewa Rivers	Local history	website, operated by the Alma Historical Society
Almond Historical Museum	Almond	Portage	Central Sands Prairie	Local history	Operated by the Almond Historical Society
Amberg Historical Museum Complex	Amberg	Marinette	Lake Michigan	Open-air	Includes a fire station, early 20th century period house, industrial displays, household items, operated by the Amberg Historical Society
America's Black Holocaust Museum	Milwaukee	Milwaukee	Lake Michigan	History	website, Museum is a memorial museum dedicated to the history of the Black Holocaust in America which explores the history of African-Americans in America from chattel slavery, Reconstruction, Jim Crow era, the civil rights movement, all the way to the current day.
Americanism Center Museum	Waubeka	Ozaukee	Lake Michigan	History	website, operated by the National Flag Day Foundation, includes military artifacts, local history displays, life of Bernard J. CiGrand, considered the founder of Flag Day
Anderson Arts Center	Kenosha	Kenosha	Lake Michigan	Art	website, part of the Kemper Center, multifunctional arts center showcasing the work of a variety of local, regional and national artists
Angel Museum	Beloit	Rock	Southern Savanna	Commodity - Angel-themed items	Private collection of angel figurines
AriensCo Museum	Brillion	Calumet	Central Sands Prairie	Industry	Seven decades of the company's power equipment, including tillers, tractors, riding mowers and snow blowers
Arvid E. Miller Library & Museum	Bowler	Shawano	Central Sands Prairie	Ethnic - Native American	website, history and culture of the Stockbridge-Munsee Community
Ashland Historical Museum	Ashland	Ashland	Lake Superior Northwoods	Local history	website, operated by the Ashland Historical Society
Ashwaubenon Historical Society Museum	Green Bay	Brown	Lake Michigan	Local history	website
Aztalan Museum	Lake Mills	Jefferson	Southern Savanna	Open-air	website, operated by the Lake Mills Aztalan Historical Society, includes Mississippian culture artifacts found in nearby Aztalan State Park and a mound, local history exhibits, log cabins, two pioneer churches and a schoolhouse
Badger Mine and Museum	Shullsburg	Lafayette	Southern Savanna	Industry - Mining	website, lead mine tours, life in Wisconsin's early mining communities, local history
Bangor and Area Historical Society Museum	Bangor	La Crosse	Mississippi/Chippewa Rivers	Local history	website
Bayfield Heritage Center	Bayfield	Bayfield	Lake Superior Northwoods	Local history	website, open seasonally
Bayfield Maritime Museum	Bayfield	Bayfield	Lake Superior Northwoods	Maritime	Facebook site
Beckman Mill	Beloit	Rock	Southern Savanna	Mill	website, located in Beckman Mill Park
Ben Hunt Cabin	Hales Corner	Milwaukee	Lake Michigan	Historic house	Operated by the Hales Corners Historical Society, 1920s log cabin with artifacts and memorabilia about author W. Ben Hunt, Native American artifacts
Benjamin Boorman House	Mauston	Juneau	Central Sands Prairie	Historic house	Operated by the Juneau County Historical Society, late 19th-century period house
Bergstrom-Mahler Museum of Glass	Neenah	Winnebago	Central Sands Prairie	Art	website, regional art museum with collection of paperweights and glass art
Berlin Area Historical Society Museums	Berlin	Green Lake	Central Sands Prairie	Local history	website, includes the Museum of Local History, the Berlin Bottling Works with an early 20th century living and kitchen area, ice harvesting equipment and early print shop equipment, and the Huser Blacksmith Shop
Bernard Schwartz House	Two Rivers	Manitowoc	Lake Michigan	Historic house	1930s house designed by Frank Lloyd Wright
Beth Israel Synagogue Museum	Stevens Point	Portage	Central Sands Prairie	Religious	Operated by the Portage County Historical Society
Betty Brinn Children's Museum	Milwaukee	Milwaukee	Lake Michigan	Children's	website
Beulah Brinton House	Milwaukee	Milwaukee	Lake Michigan	Historic house	Operated by the Bay View Historical Society for events and programs
Beyer Home Museum	Oconto	Oconto	Lake Michigan	Historic house	website, operated by Oconto County Historical Society, 1890s period house
Black Earth Museum	Black Earth	Dane	Southern Savanna	Local history	Operated by the Black Earth Historical Society in a historic depot
Black Point Estate	Linn	Walworth	Southern Savanna	Historic house	Late-19th-century Queen Anne-style mansion and grounds
Blanchardville Museum	Blanchardville	Lafayette	Southern Savanna	Local history	Operated by the Blanchardville Historical Society
Boscobel Depot Museum	Boscobel	Grant	Mississippi/Chippewa Rivers	Local history	Area railroad and turn-of-the-century life
Boscobel Grand Army of the Republic Hall	Boscobel	Grant	Mississippi/Chippewa Rivers	Military	American Civil War exhibits
Bowman House	Wisconsin Dells	Columbia	Southern Savanna	Historic house	Operated by the Dells Country Historical Society, 20th-century house with period furnishings and items of local history
Brandon Historical Society Museum	Brandon	Fond du Lac	Central Sands Prairie	Local history	Located upstairs in the Brandon Library
Branstiter Museum	Greenwood	Clark	Central Sands Prairie	Local history	website, website, features historical store front displays and a boardwalk, miniature antique toy cars, over 200 toy tractors, antique tools, and a life-size fire engine
Brickyard School Museum	Merrill	Lincoln	Lake Superior Northwoods	School	Operated by the Merrill Historical Society
Brillion History House Museum	Brillion	Calumet	Central Sands Prairie	History	website, operated by the Brillion Historical Society
Brodhead Depot Museum	Brodhead	Green	Southern Savanna	History	website, operated by the Brodhead Historical Society
Browntown Historical Museum	Browntown	Green	Southern Savanna	Local history	
Bruce Area Historical Museum	Bruce	Rusk	Lake Superior Northwoods	Local history	Operated by the Bruce Area Historical Society
Building for Kids	Appleton	Outagamie	Central Sands Prairie	Children's	website, also known as Fox Cities Children's Museum
Burlington Historical Society Museum	Burlington	Racine	Lake Michigan	Local history	website
Cable Natural History Museum	Cable	Bayfield	Lake Superior Northwoods	Natural history	website
Cadott Area Historical Society Museum	Cadott	Chippewa	Mississippi/Chippewa Rivers	Local history	Includes Baker School Museum
Calumet County Historical Museum	Chilton	Calumet	Central Sands Prairie	Local history	website, operated by the Calumet County Historical Society
Cambridge Historic School Museum	Cambridge	Dane	Southern Savanna	Local history	
Camp Five Museum	Laona	Forest	Lake Superior Northwoods	Multiple	Logging camp, includes farm, nature center, Lumberjack Steam Train, nature tours
Cana Island Light	Baileys Harbor	Door	Lake Michigan	Maritime	Operated by the Door County Maritime Museum, lighthouse tower to climb and keeper's quarters
Carlin House and Turner Museum	Palmyra	Jefferson	Southern Savanna	Local history	website, operated by the Palmyra Historical Society, mid 19th-century period house and local history museum
Cedarburg Cultural Center	Cedarburg	Ozaukee	Lake Michigan	Multiple	Performing arts center, art gallery and education facility, operates tours of the 1849 Kuhefuss House Museum and restored 1920s schoolroom
Cedarburg History Museum	Cedarburg	Ozaukee	Lake Michigan	Local & Americana History	website, free & rotating exhibits of artifacts from 1840s to 21st century with a Cedarburg emphasis
Center for Visual Arts	Wausau	Marathon	Central Sands Prairie	Art	website, offers free exhibits in three professional gallery spaces
Center Valley Grade School	Center	Outagamie	Central Sands Prairie	School	Open by appointment
Central Wisconsin Children's Museum	Stevens Point	Portage	Central Sands Prairie	Children's	website
Chalet of the Golden Fleece	New Glarus	Green	Southern Savanna	Historic house	Copy of a Swiss Bernase mountain chalet including furnishings
Charles A. Grignon Mansion	Kaukauna	Outagamie	Central Sands Prairie	Historic house	1837-62 period mansion
Charles Allis Art Museum	Milwaukee	Milwaukee	Lake Michigan	Art	19th-century mansion with 19th-century French and American paintings, furnishings and decorative arts, and changing exhibits
Chazen Museum of Art	Madison	Dane	Southern Savanna	Art	Part of University of Wisconsin–Madison, formerly known as Elvehjem Museum of Art, includes American and European paintings, sculpture, prints, drawing, photography and decorative arts
Chetek Area Museum	Chetek	Barron	Lake Superior Northwoods	Local history	website, operated by the Chetek Area Historical Society
Children's Museum of Eau Claire	Eau Claire	Eau Claire	Mississippi/Chippewa Rivers	Children's	website
Children's Museum of Fond du Lac	Fond du Lac	Fond du Lac	Central Sands Prairie	Children's	website
Children's Museum of La Crosse	La Crosse	La Crosse	Mississippi/Chippewa Rivers	Children's	website, also known as Gertrude Salzer Gordon Children's Museum
Chippewa Falls Museum of Industry and Technology	Chippewa Falls	Chippewa	Mississippi/Chippewa Rivers	Technology	website, area industries and technology, including the Seymour Cray Supercomputer Collection, Jacob Leinenkugel Brewing Company, Hubbard Scientific and other area companies
Chippewa Valley Museum	Eau Claire	Eau Claire	Mississippi/Chippewa Rivers	Local history	website, Native Americans, pioneers, city development, farming, includes a one-room school and a log house, located in Carson Park
Chocolate Experience Museum	Burlington	Racine	Lake Michigan	Food	website, history of chocolate
Christopher Columbus Museum	Columbus	Columbia	Southern Savanna	Local history	Located in an antiques mall, features souvenir memorabilia from Chicago's 1893 World's Columbian Exposition and explorer Christopher Columbus
Christ Church Museum of Local History	Germantown	Washington	Southern Savanna	Local history	
Circus World Museum	Baraboo	Sauk	Southern Savanna	Circus	Circus artifacts and exhibits, also hosts daily live circus performances throughout the summer
Civil War Museum (Wisconsin)	Kenosha	Kenosha	Lake Michigan	Military	website, American Civil War as seen and experienced on the home front in Illinois, Indiana, Iowa, Michigan, Minnesota, and Wisconsin
Clark County Jail	Neillsville	Clark	Central Sands Prairie	Jail	Period sheriff residence and jail cells, period business and room displays, local history
Colfax Railroad Museum	Colfax	Dunn	Mississippi/Chippewa Rivers	Railroad	
Cook-Rutledge House	Chippewa Falls	Chippewa	Mississippi/Chippewa Rivers	Historic house	Late 19th century Victorian mansion
Copper Culture State Park	Oconto	Oconto	Lake Michigan	Archaeology	Includes Charles Werrenbroeck Museum with artifacts of Copper Culture peoples
Crivitz Area Museum	Crivitz	Marinette	Lake Michigan	Local history	Operated by the Crivitz-Stephenson Historical Society
Cross Plains-Berry Historical Society Museum	Cross Plains	Dane	Southern Savanna	Local history	
Grant County History Museum	Lancaster	Grant	Mississippi/Chippewa Rivers	Local history	website, operated by the Grant County Historical Society
Dartford Historical Society Museums	Green Lake	Green Lake	Central Sands Prairie	History	website, 1870s railroad depot and the former public library
Death's Door Maritime Museum	Gills Rock	Door	Lake Michigan	Maritime	website, operated by the Door County Maritime Museum, focus is area's commercial fishing tradition, includes 45-foot wooden fishing tug Hope, replica net shed
Deke Slayton Memorial Space and Bike Museum	Sparta	Monroe	Central Sands Prairie	Multiple	website, career of "Deke" Slayton, Wisconsin astronauts and aviation in Monroe County, history of bicycling
Dells Mill	Augusta	Eau Claire	Mississippi/Chippewa Rivers	Mill	1864 water-powered grist mill
Dinosaur Discovery Museum	Kenosha	Kenosha	Lake Michigan	Natural history	Dinosaurs and fossils, focus on the link between birds and meat-eating dinosaurs
Discovery World	Milwaukee	Milwaukee	Lake Michigan	Science	Innovation and technology, Great Lakes natural history and conservation
Dodge Center Museum	Juneau	Dodge	Southern Savanna	Local history	
Dodge County Historical Museum	Beaver Dam	Dodge	Southern Savanna	Local history	Located in the former Williams Free Library
Dodge Mining Camp Cabin	Dodgeville	Iowa	Southern Savanna	Historic site	Open by appointment, designated Iowa County's oldest building, displays of local history
Door County Historical Museum	Sturgeon Bay	Door	Lake Michigan	History	website
Door County Maritime Museum	Sturgeon Bay	Door	Lake Michigan	Maritime	Exhibits include lighthouses, model ships and boats, shipwrecks, area's shipbuilding companies, restored 1960s-era tug boat
Douglas County Historical Society Museum	Superior	Douglas	Lake Superior Northwoods	Local history	website
Dousman Stagecoach Inn	Brookfield	Waukesha	Southern Savanna	Historic site	website, operated by the Elmbrook Historical Society, mid-19th century period inn
Dr. Kate Newcomb Museum	Woodruff	Oneida	Lake Superior Northwoods	Biography	website, life of Dr. Kate Pelham Newcomb, local history
Drummond Historical Museum	Drummond	Bayfield	Lake Superior Northwoods	Local history	website, includes wildlife exhibit
Durkee Mansion	Kenosha	Kenosha	Lake Michigan	Historic house	website, part of the Kemper Center, Victorian period mansion
EAA AirVenture Museum	Oshkosh	Winnebago	Central Sands Prairie	Aviation	Historic and hand-made aircraft
Eagle Bluff Lighthouse Museum	Ephraim	Door	Lake Michigan	Maritime	Lighthouse open for tour, located in Peninsula State Park
Eagle Historical Society Museum	Eagle	Waukesha	Southern Savanna	Local history	website
East Troy Electric Railroad Museum	East Troy	Walworth	Southern Savanna	Railroad	Heritage railroad and historic electric railway equipment
Elkhart Lake Depot Museum	Elkhart Lake	Sheboygan	Lake Michigan	Railroad	Area railroad and local history artifacts
Elmer's Auto & Toy Museum	Fountain City	Buffalo	Mississippi/Chippewa Rivers	Transportation, Toy	website, features five museum buildings with muscle, antique, classic cars and trucks, bicycles, motorcycles, pedal cars, antique toys, tools, and dolls
Elroy Historical Society Museum	Elroy	Juneau	Central Sands Prairie	Local history	
Empire in Pine Museum	Downsville	Dunn	Mississippi/Chippewa Rivers	Industry - Logging, quarry	Logging and sandstone quarry history of Red Cedar Valley, may be closed, formerly operated by the Dunn County Historical Society
Ephraim Village Museums	Ephraim	Door	Lake Michigan	Open-air	website, includes the Anderson Barn History Center, Anderson Store Museum, Goodletson Cabin Museum and Iverson House Museum
Fairlawn Mansion	Superior	Douglas	Lake Superior Northwoods	Historic house	website, part of Superior Public Museums, Victorian period house museum
Fennimore Doll & Toy Museum	Fennimore	Grant	Southern Savanna	Toy	website, classic and collectible dolls and toys from around the world
Fennimore Railroad Historical Society Museum	Fennimore	Grant	Southern Savanna	Railroad	website
First Capitol	Belmont	Lafayette	Southern Savanna	History	Birthplace of Wisconsin territorial government
Flyways Waterfowl Museum	Baraboo	Sauk	Southern Savanna	Natural history	website, antique and modern waterfowl decoys, bands and calls, showcases over 50 North American waterfowl species in their natural settings, duck blind theatre, duck stamp art, duck hunting, wetlands conservation
Foreaker One Room Schoolhouse	Viroqua	Vernon	Mississippi/Chippewa Rivers	School	website, operated by the Vernon County Historical Society for school programs and by appointment
Forest County Museum	Crandon	Forest	Lake Superior Northwoods	Local history	website, operated by the Forest County Historical & Genealogical Society
Forest County Potawatomi Cultural Center and Museum	Crandon	Forest	Lake Superior Northwoods	Ethnic - Native American	History, culture and traditions of the Potawatomi people
Fort Crawford Museum	Prairie du Chien	Crawford	Mississippi/Chippewa Rivers	Military	19th century military hospital for the fort, exhibits about the fort, city history, frontier medicine
Fort McCoy Commemorative Area	Fort McCoy	Monroe	Central Sands Prairie	Military	website, open by appointment for groups of 20 or more, includes World War II-era buildings and exhibits about the fort's history during the war, the History Center with exhibits about the fort's history and the Equipment Park
Fort Winnebago Surgeon's Quarters	Portage	Columbia	Fox/Wisconsin Rivers	Historic site	1824 log building, owned and operated by the Wisconsin Society Daughters of the American Revolution
Forts Folle Avoine Historical Park	Danbury	Burnett	Lake Superior Northwoods	Open-air	website, reconstructed fur trade post, authentic Woodland Indian village
Fountain City Area Historical Society Museum	Fountain City	Buffalo	Mississippi/Chippewa Rivers	History	website
Fox Lake Depot Museum	Fox Lake	Dodge	Southern Savanna	Local history	Operated by the Fox Lake Historical Society in the 1884 Milwaukee Road Depot
Frederic Soo Line Depot/Frederic Area Historical Museum	Frederic	Polk	Lake Superior Northwoods	Local history	website, operated by the Frederic Area Historical Society
Freedom Area Historical Society Museum	Freedom	Outagamie	Central Sands Prairie	Local history	
Gallery 450	Marshfield	Wood	Central Sands Prairie	Art	website, located in the lobby of the Helen Connor Laird Fine Arts Building of University of Wisconsin–Marshfield/Wood County
Galloway House and Village	Fond du Lac	Fond du Lac	Central Sands Prairie	Living	website, late 1800s village, includes Blakely Museum with historical collections from Native American to present
George W. Brown Jr. Ojibwe Museum and Cultural Center	Lac du Flambeau	Vilas	Lake Superior Northwoods	Ethnic - Native American	website, culture of Lac du Flambeau Band of Lake Superior Chippewa Indians
Gordon-Wascott Historical Museum & Depot	Gordon	Douglas	Lake Superior Northwoods	Local history	website, operated by the Gordon-Wascott Historical Society
Grand River Valley Museum	Markesan	Green Lake	Central Sands Prairie	Local history	website, operated by the Markesan Historical Society
Grandview	Hollandale	Iowa	Southern Savanna	Art	website, farmhouse covered in concrete inlaid with shards of china, glass, beads, buttons, and sea shells, and 40 concrete sculptures, copies of artist Nick Engelbert's paintings
Grantsburg Area Historical Society Museum	Grantsburg	Burnett	Lake Superior Northwoods	Local history	website, located in a former Norwegian Methodist Church, includes the original three cell county jail
Green County Historical Museum	Monroe	Green	Southern Savanna	History	website, operated by the Green County Historical Society
Grohmann Museum	Milwaukee	Milwaukee	Lake Michigan	Art	Collection dedicated to the evolution of human work. features European art, particularly German and Dutch
H. H. Bennett Studio	Wisconsin Dells	Columbia	Southern Savanna	History	Restored nineteenth century photography studio and museum about famous landscape photographer H.H. Bennett
Haas Fine Arts Center	Eau Claire	Eau Claire	Mississippi/Chippewa Rivers	Art	Part of University of Wisconsin–Eau Claire, features the Foster Gallery with exhibits works by faculty, BFA degree candidates and internationally known artists
Haese Memorial Village	Forest Junction	Calumet	Central Sands Prairie	Open-air	Remnants of a historic business district
Haggerty Museum of Art	Milwaukee	Milwaukee	Lake Michigan	Art	Part of Marquette University, European and American visual art
Hamilton Wood Type and Printing Museum	Two Rivers	Manitowoc	Lake Michigan	Industry - Printing	Operated by the Two Rivers Historical Society, focus is the preservation, study, production and printing of wood type used in letterpress printing
Hamlin Garland House	West Salem	La Crosse	Mississippi/Chippewa Rivers	Historic house	Home of author Hamlin Garland
Hansen-Newell-Bennett House Museum	DeForest	Dane	Southern Savanna	Local history	website, operated by the DeForest Area Historical Society,
Hardy Gallery	Ephraim	Door	Lake Michigan	Art	website, community gallery of the Peninsula Arts Association, located on the historic Anderson Dock
Harley-Davidson Museum	Milwaukee	Milwaukee	Lake Michigan	Transportation - Motorcycles	History of Harley-Davidson and motorcycles
Hawks Inn Historical Museum	Delafield	Waukesha	Southern Savanna	History	website, mid 19th-century stagecoach stop
Hazelwood Historic House Museum	Green Bay	Brown	Lake Michigan	Historic house	website, operated by the Brown County Historical Society, Victorian period house
Hearthstone Historic House Museum	Appleton	Outagamie	Central Sands Prairie	Historic house	Late 19th-century mansion that was the first local house to be powered by electricity, features original electrical fixtures
Helen Jeffris Wood Museum	Janesville	Rock	Southern Savanna	Local history	website, operated by the Rock County Historical Society
Henschel's Indian Museum	Sheboygan	Sheboygan	Lake Michigan	Ethnic - Native American	website, includes stone tools, projectile points, pottery, copper implements, bone tools
Herb and Helen Haydock World of Beer Memorabilia	Monroe	Green	Southern Savanna	Beverage	website, located at the Minhas Craft Brewery, includes brewery lithographed pictures, cooper tools, wooden keg and cases, steins, growlers, NASCAR cars, bar and beer lights, model brewery trucks, cars, trains and other brewery vehicles
Heritage Hill State Historical Park	Green Bay	Brown	Lake Michigan	Open-air	48-acre (19 ha) open-air museum of 25 historical structures
Heritage Historical Village	New London	Outagamie	Central Sands Prairie	Open-air	website, includes an octagon shaped house, school, church, log cabin, and a train depot that are furnished with original or period furnishings
Heritage Park	Plover	Portage	Central Sands Prairie	Open-air	Operated by the Portage County Historical Society, includes Old Plover Methodist Church, houses, school, depot, stores, represents life between 1870 and 1910
Herman C. Timm House	New Holstein	Calumet	Central Sands Prairie	Historic house	Late 19th century Victorian mansion, operated by the New Holstein Historical Society
Historic Indian Agency House	Portage	Columbia	Southern Savanna	Historic house	Mid 19th-century period house
Historic Washington House	Two Rivers	Manitowoc	Lake Michigan	Local history	Mid 19th-century hotel for immigrants, serves as a history museum, ice cream parlor and visitor center
History Museum at the Castle	Appleton	Outagamie	Central Sands Prairie	Local history	Includes collections of magician Harry Houdini, author Edna Ferber, operated by the Outagamie County Historical Society
Hixon House	La Crosse	La Crosse	Mississippi/Chippewa Rivers	Historic house	Victorian period house, operated by the La Crosse County Historical Society
Hoard Historical Museum	Fort Atkinson	Jefferson	Southern Savanna	Multiple	Local cultural and natural history exhibits and the National Dairy Shrine visitor center with exhibits about dairying
Hollenstein Wagon & Carriage Factory Museum	Mayville	Dodge	Southern Savanna	Local history	Operated by the Mayville Historical Society, displays on city history, people and businesses, includes adjoining house with antique furnishings and pictures and a farm shop with agricultural tools and machinery
Honey of a Museum	Ashippun	Dodge	Southern Savanna	Food - Honey	website, live bees, history of beekeeping, natural history of bees, honey, established in 1852.
House on the Rock	Spring Green	Iowa	Southern Savanna	Historic house	Complex of architecturally unique rooms, streets, gardens and shops
Howard Morey House	Birchwood	Washburn	Lake Superior Northwoods	Historic house	Operated by the Birchwood Area Historical Society
Hutchinson House Museum	Waupaca	Waupaca	Central Sands Prairie	Historic house	website, operated by the Waupaca Historical Society
International Clown Hall of Fame	Baraboo	Sauk	Southern Savanna	Hall of fame - Clowns	Clown performers, art and achievement
Iola Historic Village	Iola	Waupaca	Central Sands Prairie	Open-air	website, operated by the Iola Historical Society, includes a depot and caboose, town hall and outdoor privy, schoolhouse, firehouse and log cabin
Iowa County Historical Society Museum	Dodgeville	Iowa	Southern Savanna	Local history	website, includes the Floyd School
Iron County Historical Museum	Hurley	Iron	Lake Superior Northwoods	Local history	
I. S. Horgen Farm Museum	Wausau	Marathon	Central Sands Prairie	Agriculture	Historic farm machinery, hand tools, household utensils, and other related items, open by appointment and during the Wisconsin Valley Fair
Jackson County Historical Society Museum	Black River Falls	Jackson	Mississippi/Chippewa Rivers Region	Local history	website, operated by the Jackson County Historical Society, located in a former Carnegie library
Jackson Historical Society Museum and One-Room Schoolhouse	Jackson	Washington	Southern Savanna	Local history	
James Newman Clark Bird Museum	Eau Claire	Eau Claire	Mississippi/Chippewa Rivers	Natural history	Part of University of Wisconsin–Eau Claire, bird specimens and dioramas of birds in their native habitat, located in Phillips Hall
Jeremiah Curtin House	Greendale	Milwaukee	Lake Michigan	Historic house	Operated by the Milwaukee County Historical Society, mid-19th-century house, open by appointment
Jewish Museum Milwaukee	Milwaukee	Milwaukee	Lake Michigan	Ethnic - Jewish	Jewish heritage and culture, Jewish experience through the lens of Greater Milwaukee
John Beck Log House	Solon Springs	Douglas	Lake Superior Northwoods	Historic house	Also known as the Solon Springs Historical Museum, operated by the Solon Springs Historical Society
John Hustis House/Museum	Hustisford	Dodge	Southern Savanna	Historic house	Operated by the Hustisford Historical Society, includes exhibits on local history
John Michael Kohler Arts Center	Sheboygan	Sheboygan	Lake Michigan	Art	Includes ten galleries, a theater, performance and meeting spaces, studio classrooms
Jolivette Historic House	Lodi	Columbia	Southern Savanna	Local history	website, operated by the Lodi Valley Historical Society
Jonathan Clark House	Mequon	Ozaukee	Lake Michigan	Historic house	1848 house displaying pioneer life, numerous open house events, rentals and tours by appointment
Julaine Farrow Museum	Winnebago	Winnebago	Central Sands Prairie	Medical	website, history of mental health treatment at the Winnebago Mental Health Institute
Jump River Valley Historical Museum	Catawba	Price	Lake Superior Northwoods	Local history	
Kenosha History Center	Kenosha	Kenosha	Lake Michigan	Local history	website, operated by the Kenosha County Historical Society, includes the Southport Light Station Museum, a restored light keeper's home and lighthouse
Kenosha Public Museum	Kenosha	Kenosha	Lake Michigan	Multiple	Natural history, fine and decorative arts
Kewaskum Historical Society Museum and Log Cabin	Kewaskum	Fond du Lac	Central Sands Prairie	Local history	
Kewaunee County Historical Museum	Kewaunee	Kewaunee	Lake Michigan	Local history	website, operated by the Kewaunee County Historical Society
Kewaunee County Jail Museum	Kewaunee	Kewaunee	Lake Michigan	Local history	Operated by the Kewaunee County Historical Society, originally built in 1876 as the sheriff's office, residence and county jail
Kilbourntown House	Shorewood	Milwaukee	Lake Michigan	Historic house	Operated by the Milwaukee County Historical Society, mid 19th century period house
Kneeland-Walker House	Wauwatosa	Milwaukee	Lake Michigan	Historic house	Late Victorian mansion, operated by the Wauwatosa Historical Society
Knox Creek Heritage Center	Brantwood	Price	Lake Superior Northwoods	Open-air	website, includes eight buildings and artifacts representing several ethnic groups in southeastern Price County, open by appointment and for events
L. R. Ingersoll Physics Museum	Madison	Dane	Southern Savanna	Science	Operated by the University of Wisconsin–Madison, interactive experiences of physical concepts ranging from mechanics to modern physics
La Crosse County Historical Society Museum	La Crosse	La Crosse	Mississippi/Chippewa Rivers	Local history	website, main headquarters
Lafayette County Historical Society Museum	Darlington	Lafayette	Southern Savanna	Local history	website, also Depot Museum with railroad exhibits
Langlade County Historical Society Museum	Antigo	Langlade	Lake Superior Northwoods	Local history	Includes main building in a former library, 440 Locomotive, Deleglise Cabin and the AVA (Antigo Visual Arts Association) Gallery
Laura Ingalls Wilder Museum	Pepin	Pepin	Mississippi/Chippewa Rivers	Biography	website, also known as Pepin Historical Museum, life of Laura Ingalls Wilder, pioneer life
Leigh Yawkey Woodson Art Museum	Wausau	Marathon	Central Sands Prairie	Art	8 to 10 exhibitions a year, housed in an updated 1931 English Tudor period Cotswold-style residence
Lest We Forget Military Museum	Marshfield	Wood	Central Sands Prairie	Military	Housed in the Marshfield Public Library
Lincoln Center	Beloit	Rock	Southern Savanna	Local history	website, operated by the Beloit Historical Society
Lincoln-Tallman House	Janesville	Rock	Southern Savanna	Historic house	1850s house that Abraham Lincoln slept in, operated by the Rock County Historical Society
Little Chute Windmill	Little Chute	Outagamie	Central Sands Prairie	Historic site	Authentic, fully functioning 1850s design windmill and visitor center
Little Falls Railroad & Doll Museum	Sparta	Monroe	Central Sands Prairie	Toy - Toy railroads, dolls	website, dolls and model railroads
Little House Wayside	Pepin	Pepin	Mississippi/Chippewa Rivers	Historic house	Replica of the house that was described in the book, Little House in the Big Woods
Little White Schoolhouse	Ripon	Fond du Lac	Central Sands Prairie	History	Site considered the birthplace of the Republican Party
Logic Puzzle Museum	Burlington	Racine	Lake Michigan	Toy	website, hands-on brain teaser puzzles
Logan Museum of Anthropology	Beloit	Rock	Southern Savanna	Anthropology	Part of Beloit College, archaeological and ethnological objects from around the world
Log Museum	Birchwood	Washburn	Lake Superior Northwoods	Industry	Operated by the Birchwood Area Historical Society
Lost Lake-Randolph Museum	Randolph	Dodge	Southern Savanna	Local history	website, operated by the Lost Lake Historical Society
Lowell Damon House	Wauwatosa	Milwaukee	Lake Michigan	Historic house	Operated by the Milwaukee County Historical Society, open on Sundays
Loyal Area Historical Society Museums	Loyal	Clark	Central Sands Prairie	Local history	website, includes the Railroad Museum, Gas Station Museum and Museum
Lynden Sculpture Garden	Milwaukee	Milwaukee	Lake Michigan	Art	40-acre outdoor sculpture park
Madeline Island Historical Museum	Madeline Island	Ashland	Lake Superior Northwoods	Local history	Operated by the Wisconsin Historical Society, local history including Native American tribes, the fur trade, early missionaries and maritime history
Madison Children's Museum	Madison	Dane	Southern Savanna	Children's	Exhibits on the arts, sciences, history, culture, health and civic engagement
Madison Museum of Contemporary Art	Madison	Dane	Southern Savanna	Art	Contemporary art
Malone Area Heritage Museum	Malone	Fond du Lac	Central Sands Prairie	Local history	Local history, immigrants, farming, railroad
Manitowoc Heritage Center	Manitowoc	Manitowoc	Lake Michigan	Local history	website, operated by the Manitowoc County Historical Society
Marathon County Historical Museum	Wausau	Marathon	Central Sands Prairie	Historic house	Early 20th-century mansion
Marinette County Historical Society Logging Museum	Marinette	Marinette	Lake Michigan	Industry - Logging	Located on Stephenson Island, regional logging & maritime history
Marquette County Historical Society Museum	Westfield	Marquette	Central Sands Prairie	Local history	Grounds include the Cochrane-Nelson Home, the Kerst Exhibit Building, the Henry Ellis railroad section house and a gazebo
Mayville Limestone School Museum	Mayville	Dodge	Southern Savanna	Local history	website
Mazomanie Historical Society Museum	Mazomanie	Dane	Southern Savanna	Local history	website
McFarland Historical Society Museum	McFarland	Dane	Southern Savanna	Local history	website, includes the Museum Building on Main Street, the Victorian-period Larson House Museum, and a log cabin
Mellen Historical Museum	Mellen	Ashland	Lake Superior Northwoods	Local history	Operated by the Mellen Area Historical Society
Menge House Museum	Fall Creek	Eau Claire	Mississippi/Chippewa Rivers	Local history	website, operated by the Fall Creek Historical Society, early 20th-century house constructed of cement blocks
Menominee County Heritage Museum	Menominee	Menominee	Central Sands Prairie	Local history	website, operated by the Menominee County Historical Society
Merrill History & Culture Center	Merrill	Lincoln	Lake Superior Northwoods	Local history	website, operated by the Merrill Historical Society
Mid-Continent Railway Museum	North Freedom	Sauk	Southern Savanna	Railroad	Features restored engines and cars, historic railroad buildings, and a 7-mile round trip ride aboard preserved railroad cars
Middleton Area Historical Society	Middleton	Dane	Southern Savanna	Local history	website, tours of the Rowley House, displays at the Middleton Depot
Military Veterans Museum and Education Center	Oshkosh	Winnebago	Central Sands Prairie	Military	website, Historic military vehicles and artifacts from WWI to present.
Miller Art Museum	Sturgeon Bay	Door	Lake Michigan	Art	website, Wisconsin artists
Milton House	Milton	Rock	Southern Savanna	Historic house	19th century inn that was part of the Underground Railroad, tours by appointment with the Milton Historical Society
Milwaukee Art Museum	Milwaukee	Milwaukee	Lake Michigan	Art	Collections include 15th- to 20th-century European and 17th- to 20th-century American paintings, sculpture, prints, drawings, decorative arts, photographs, and folk and self-taught art
Milwaukee Beer Museum	Milwaukee	Milwaukee	Lake Michigan	Commodity - Beer	website, beer and saloon artifacts including beer bottles, signs, advertising, equipment, memorabilia
Milwaukee County War Memorial Center	Milwaukee	Milwaukee	Lake Michigan	Military	Includes military poster collection
Milwaukee Public Museum	Milwaukee	Milwaukee	Lake Michigan	Multiple	Natural history, state history and culture
Mineral Point Railroad Museum	Mineral Point	Iowa	Southern Savanna	Railroad	website, located in a historic depot
Mining Museum & Rollo Jamison Museum	Platteville	Grant	Mississippi/Chippewa Rivers	Multiple	website, two adjacent museums feature underground tour of Bevans Lead Mine, ride in above-ground mine train, and exhibits on Platteville area history
Minocqua Museum	Minocqua	Oneida	Lake Superior Northwoods	Local history	Includes model train layout
Mishicot Historical Museum	Mishicot	Manitowoc	Lake Michigan	Local history	
Mitchell Gallery of Flight	Milwaukee	Milwaukee	Lake Michigan	Aviation	Located inside General Mitchell International Airport, exhibits of aviation history and Milwaukee's contributions
Mitchell Rountree Stone Cottage	Lancaster	Grant	Mississippi/Chippewa Rivers	Historic house	website, operated by the Grant County Historical Society
Monroe Arts Center	Monroe	Green	Southern Savanna	Art	Housed in a former church
Monroe County Museum	Sparta	Monroe	Central Sands Prairie	Local history	Exhibits about Monroe County people, pioneer history, agriculture, military history, industry, business, and the home
Monticello Area Historical Society Museum	Monticello	Green	Southern Savanna	History	website
Motorama Auto Museum	Aniwa	Marathon	Mid 20th century vehicles	History	website, rare cars from around the world, Army trucks, motorcycles, military vehicles, race cars
Mount Horeb Area Historical Society Museum	Mt. Horeb	Dane	Southern Savanna	Local history	website
Mukwonago Red Brick Museum	Mukwonago	Waukesha	Southern Savanna	Local history	website, restored Victorian period house, features Native American artifacts
Mueller-Wright House	Wrightstown	Brown	Lake Michigan	Historic house	Operated by the Wrightstown Historical Society, late 19th-century period house
Museum at the Portage	Portage	Columbia	Southern Savanna	Local history	website
Museum of Beer and Brewing	Milwaukee	Milwaukee	Lake Michigan	Commodity - Beer	Planned museum, exhibits currently hosted at temporary sites, history of beer and the brewing industry throughout the centuries
Museum of Historic Torture Devices	Wisconsin Dells	Columbia	Southern Savanna	History	website, collection of torture devices
Museum of Wisconsin Art	West Bend	Washington	Southern Savanna	Art	Wisconsin artists, focus on Carl von Marr
Museum of Woodcarving	Shell Lake	Washburn	Lake Superior Northwoods	Art	Collection of life-size and miniature wood carvings created by one man, Joseph T. Barta
Myrtle Lintner Spear Museum	Pardeeville	Columbia	Southern Savanna	Local history	Also known as the Columbia County Museum, operated by the Columbia County Historical Society in a historic hotel building
Nathaniel W. Dean House	Madison	Dane	Southern Savanna	Historic house	website, operated by the Historic Blooming Grove Historical Society, late 19th-century period house
National Bobblehead Hall of Fame and Museum	Milwaukee, Wisconsin	Milwaukee	Lake Michigan	Hall of fame & Museum	Exhibits 10,000 different bobbleheads from around the world.
National Freshwater Fishing Hall of Fame & Museum	Hayward	Sawyer	Lake Superior Northwoods	Hall of fame - Sports	Exhibits of over 400 mounted fish, outboard motors, records for the largest fresh water fish in the United States and the world
National Historic Cheesemaking Center	Monroe	Green	Southern Savanna	Industry - Cheese	website, story of early area cheesemaking, process and equipment
National Midget Auto Racing Hall of Fame	Sun Prairie	Dane	Southern Savanna	Hall of fame - Midget auto racing	Located at Angell Park Speedway, history of Midget car racing
National Mustard Museum	Middleton	Dane	Southern Savanna	Food - Mustard	Features mustard from around the world, mustard memorabilia and exhibits depicting the use of mustard through history
National Railroad Museum	Ashwaubenon	Brown	Lake Michigan	Railroad	Railroad engines, rolling stock, railroad artifacts, an archive and photography gallery
Neville Public Museum	Green Bay	Brown	Lake Michigan	Multiple	History, science, art
New Berlin Historical Museum	New Berlin	Waukesha	Southern Savanna	Open-air	website, operated by the New Berlin Historical Society
New Lisbon Memorial Library	New Lisbon	Juneau	Central Sands Prairie	Native American	website, features the Harry Mortensen Collection of Native American artifacts found in the county, including many arrowheads
New London Public Museum	New London	Outagamie	Central Sands Prairie	Multiple	website, natural history, local history, Native American culture, world cultures and more, located in the lower level of the New London Public Library
New Richmond Heritage Center	New Richmond	St. Croix	Mississippi/Chippewa Rivers	Open-air	Park setting of historic buildings
New Visions Gallery	Marshfield	Wood	Central Sands Prairie	Art	website, non-profit community museum/gallery located in the lobby of Marshfield Clinic
Norskedalen	Coon Valley	Vernon	Mississippi/Chippewa Rivers	Open-air	Norwegian culture, natural history
Northern Great Lakes Visitor Center	Ashland	Ashland	Lake Superior Northwoods	Multiple	History, natural history, art, located on the northern edge of the Chequamegon-Nicolet National Forest
Northwestern Railroad Depot Museum and Log Cabins	Marion	Waupaca	Central Sands Prairie	Open-air	Operated by the Marion Area Historical Society, includes a railroad depot, caboose, mail car, log cabin, log school and tool museum
Northwoods Children's Museum	Eagle River	Vilas	Lake Superior Northwoods	Children's	website
Oak Creek Historical Society Museum Complex	Oak Creek	Milwaukee	Lake Michigan	Open-air	Includes the museum in the former town hall, 1840s period cabin, a print shop, blacksmith shop, cobbler shop, summer kitchen, farm shed with agriculture tools and equipment
Oconomowoc Area Historical Society & Museum	Oconomowoc	Waukesha	Southern Savanna	Local history	website
Octagon House (Fond du Lac)	Fond du Lac	Fond du Lac	Central Sands Prairie	Historic house	Mid-19th-century house, privately owned
Octagon House (Watertown)	Watertown	Jefferson	Southern Savanna	Historic house	Mid-19th-century house, operated by the Watertown Historical Society
Octagon House Museum	Hudson	St. Croix	Mississippi/Chippewa Rivers	Historic house	Also known as the John S. Moffat House, mid-19th-century period house
Old Anderson House Museum	Sister Bay	Door	Lake Michigan	History house	website, operated by the Sister Bay Historical Society, late 19th-century farmhouse and adjoining Corner of the Past farmstead
Old Corners School	Neva Corners	Langlade	Lake Superior Northwoods	School	Historic schoolhouse
Old Courthouse Museum	West Bend	Washington	Southern Savanna	Local history	Operated by the Washington County Historical Society, area history from the glaciers to the industrial age.
Old Courthouse Museum & Jail	Durand	Pepin	Mississippi/Chippewa Rivers	Historic site	Operated by the Pepin County Historical Society, exhibits include the courtroom, jail and displays of local history and culture
Old Falls Village Museum	Menomonee Falls	Waukesha	Southern Savanna	Open-air	website
Old Firehouse & Police Museum	Superior	Douglas	Lake Superior Northwoods	Firefighting/Police	website, part of Superior Public Museums, housing the State of Wisconsin Fire & Police Hall of Fame
Old Muskego Settlement Centre	Muskego	Waukesha	Southern Savanna	Open-air	website, operated by the Muskego Historical Society
Old Sheriff's Residence & Jail	West Bend	Washington	Southern Savanna	Historic house	Operated by the Washington County Historical Society, late 19th-century sheriff's residence used that served as the county jail until 1962, represents life in the first half of the 20th century
Old Town Hall Museum	Fifield	Price	Lake Superior Northwoods	Local history	Operated by the Price County Historical Society in a former town hall
Old World Wisconsin	Eagle	Waukesha	Southern Savanna	Open-air	Rural life, features farmsteads and settlements of various ethnic groups
Old Village Hall Museum	Neosho	Dodge	Southern Savanna	History	Operated by the Neosho/Rubicon Historical Society
Onalaska Museum	Onalaska	La Crosse	Mississippi/Chippewa Rivers	Local history	Located in the Onalaska Public Library
Oneida Nation Museum	De Pere	Brown	Lake Michigan	Ethnic - Native American	website, history, art and culture of the Oneida Nation of Wisconsin
Orchard Lawn	Mineral Point	Iowa	Southern Savanna	Historic house	website, also known as The Gundry House, 1868 Italianate home surrounded by 9 acres of lawns, flowers, and trees, operated by the Mineral Point Historical Society
Oregon Area Historical Society Museum	Oregon	Dane	Southern Savanna	Local history	website
Oshkosh Public Museum	Oshkosh	Winnebago	Central Sands Prairie	Multiple	Local history, natural history, decorative arts
Overture Center for the Arts	Madison	Dane	Southern Savanna	Art	Performing arts center and art gallery
Ozaukee County Pioneer Village	Saukville	Ozaukee	Lake Michigan	Living	website, operated by the Ozaukee County Historical Society, over 20 buildings which depict rural life in the 1800s and 1900s
Pabst Mansion	Milwaukee	Milwaukee	Lake Michigan	Historic house	Late 19th-century mansion built by Captain Frederick Pabst, founder of the Pabst Brewing Company
Paine Art Center and Gardens	Oshkosh	Winnebago	Central Sands Prairie	Historic house	Historic estate, art galleries, gardens
Paper Discovery Center	Appleton	Outagamie	Central Sands Prairie	Industry - Paper	Paper manufacturing
Passage Thru Time Museum	Potosi	Grant	Mississippi/Chippewa Rivers	Local history	website, operated by the Potosi Historical Society
Paul Bunyan Logging Camp Museum	Eau Claire	Eau Claire	Mississippi/Chippewa Rivers	Forestry	website, located in Carson Park, 1890s-period logging camp
Pedrick-Lawson House	Ripon	Fond du Lac	Central Sands Prairie	Historic house	Operated by the Ripon Historical Society
Pendarvis	Mineral Point	Iowa	Southern Savanna	Industry - Mining	Former 19th century Cornish lead mining colony
Peshtigo Fire Museum	Peshtigo	Marinette	Lake Michigan	Firefighting	
Pinecrest Historical Village	Manitowoc	Manitowoc	Lake Michigan	Living	website, village and farm life in Manitowoc County from the 1850s to the early 1900s, operated by the Manitowoc County Historical Society
Pioneer Corner Museum	New Holstein	Calumet	Central Sands Prairie	History	website, operated by the New Holstein Historical Society, local history and culture
Pioneer Log Village and Museum	Reedsburg	Sauk	Southern Savanna	Open-air	website, 1890s log homes, library, and church; cemetery, blacksmith shop, country school and country store, operated by the Reedsburg Area Historical Society
Pioneer Park	Clintonville	Waupaca	Central Sands Prairie	Open-air	Operated by the Clintonville Historical Society
Pioneer Park Historical Complex	Rhinelander	Oneida	Lake Superior Northwoods	Open-air	Includes logging and railroad equipment, a schoolhouse, fire museum, outboard motor and boating museum
Pioneer Schoolhouse Museum	Gibraltar	Door	Lake Michigan	Education	Operated by the Ephraim Historical Foundation, 19th-century schoolhouse used until 1949
Pioneer Village Museum	Cameron	Barron	Lake Superior Northwoods	Open-air	website, also known as Barron County Historical Society Museum
Point Beach Energy Education Center	Two Rivers	Manitowoc	Lake Michigan	Science	website, operated by NextEra Energy Resources, history and generation of electricity, nuclear energy, adjacent to the Point Beach Nuclear Plant
Polk County Museum	Balsam Lake	Polk	Lake Superior Northwoods	Local history	Located in the former county courthouse, includes historic room displays, antique tools, farming equipment, toys and dolls, clothing, furniture, ceramic and glass ware items, household artifacts
Port Washington Historical Society Light Station Museum	Port Washington	Ozaukee	Lake Michigan	Maritime	Restored lighthouse and recreated keeper's quarters
Portage Center for the Arts	Portage	Columbia	Fox/Wisconsin Rivers	Art	website, performing and community arts center with Drury Gallery
Portage WW II History Museum	Portage	Columbia	Fox/Wisconsin Rivers	Military	Personal, military and historic artifacts about World War II
Potosi Brewery	Potosi	Grant	Mississippi/Chippewa Rivers	Industry - Beer brewing	Includes the Potosi Brewing Company Transportation Museum with horse-drawn wagons and delivery trucks, and the National Brewery Museum with beer-making equipment, bottles and memorabilia
Pottawatomie Light	Washington	Door	Lake Michigan	Maritime	Located in Rock Island State Park,
Poynette Area Historical Museum	Poynette	Columbia	Southern Savanna	History	website, operated by the Poynette Historical Society
Prairie Moon Museum and Sculpture Garden	Cochrane	Buffalo	Mississippi/Chippewa Rivers	Art	Folk art sculpture garden, museum open by appointment, owned by the Kohler Foundation
Prescott Historical Society Museum	Prescott	Pierce	Mississippi/Chippewa Rivers	Local history	Exhibits of maritime history
Racine Art Museum	Racine	Racine	Lake Michigan	Art	Exhibits of contemporary crafts
Racine Heritage Museum	Racine	Racine	Lake Michigan	Local history	Includes area heritage of invention, innovations, and discovery, manufacturing and industry, sports, Underground Railroad
Rahr West Art Museum	Manitowoc	Manitowoc	Lake Michigan	Art	1910-period Queen Anne style house with art exhibits
Railroad Memories Museum	Spooner	Washburn	Lake Superior Northwoods	Railroad	website, includes uniforms, bells, whistles, tools, books, train interiors, lanterns, signals
Randall Park Museum	Fall Creek	Eau Claire	Mississippi/Chippewa Rivers	Local history	website, operated by the Fall Creek Historical Society
Rassbach Heritage Museum	Menomonie	Dunn	Mississippi/Chippewa Rivers	Local history	website, operated by the Dunn Historical Society
Reed School	Neillsville	Clark	Central Sands Prairie	School	Operated by the Wisconsin Historical Society, 20th-century one-room schoolhouse
Richard I. Bong World War II Heritage Center	Superior	Douglas	Lake Superior Northwoods	Military	website, life of aviator Richard Bong, military history and memorabilia from World War II and subsequent conflicts
Ripley's Believe It or Not!	Wisconsin Dells	Sauk	Southern Savanna	Amusement	
Riverside Museum (Wisconsin)	La Crosse	La Crosse	Mississippi/Chippewa Rivers	History	Operated by the La Crosse County Historical Society, artifacts brought up from the wreck of the steamboat War Eagle and from the Mississippi Valley Archaeological Center
Rogers Street Fishing Village	Two Rivers	Manitowoc	Lake Michigan	Industry - Fishing	website, museum village and heritage park about commercial fishing, includes Great Lakes Coast Guard Museum and the Two Rivers Light
Rural Arts Museum	Colby	Clark	Central Sands Prairie	Local history	Themes include railroading, dairying, and education
Rusk County Historical Society Museum	Ladysmith	Rusk	Lake Superior Northwoods	Open-air	Located on the Rusk County fair grounds, local history and culture
Satterlee Clark Home	Horicon	Dodge	Southern Savanna	Historic house	website, operated by the Horicon Historical Society
Sauk County Historical Museum	Baraboo	Sauk	Southern Savanna	Historic house	website, located in the Jacob Van Orden Mansion, operated by the Sauk County Historical Society
Sawyer County Historical Society Museum	Hayward	Sawyer	Lake Superior Northwoods	Local history	website
SC Johnson	Racine	Racine	Lake Michigan	Multiple	Includes tours of S. C. Johnson & Son buildings designed by Frank Lloyd Wright, the SC Johnson Gallery: At Home with Frank Lloyd Wright with his drawings and artifacts
Schlegelmilch-McDaniel House	Eau Claire	Eau Claire	Mississippi/Chippewa Rivers	Historic house	Operated by the Chippewa Valley Museum as a turn-of-the-century period middle-class house
Schumacher Farm Park	Waunakee	Dane	Southern Savanna	Living	website, 1900s farmstead & farmhouse museums
Seymour Community Museum	Seymour	Outagamie	Central Sands Prairie	Local history	website, operated by the Seymour Historical Society, features collection of hamburger-related items
Sheboygan County Historical Museum	Sheboygan	Sheboygan	Lake Michigan	History	Includes four historic buildings: the 1850s David Taylor House, the 1860s Weinhold Log House and Bodenstab Cheese Factory, and the 1890s Schuchardt Barn
Sherry-Butt House	Viroqua	Vernon	Mississippi/Chippewa Rivers	Historic house	website, operated by the Vernon County Historical Society, turn-of-the-century period house
Sila Lydia Bast Bell Museum	Germantown	Washington	Southern Savanna	Commodity - Bells	website, operated by the Germantown Historical Society, features over 5000 bells, located in Dheinsville
Silver Wheel Manor Doll Museum	Fond du Lac	Fond du Lac	Central Sands Prairie	Toy - Dolls	website, over 2000 dolls, model trains, doll houses, antique toys and Christmas collectibles
Snowmobile Hall of Fame and Museum	St. Germain	Vilas	Lake Superior Northwoods	Hall of fame - Snowmobiling	website, includes historic race sleds, trophies, clothing and photos
Solomon Juneau and John Schiefer Historic Homes and Reklau Log Building	Theresa	Dodge	Southern Savanna	Historic house	Operated by the Theresa Historical Society
South Milwaukee Historical Society Museum	South Milwaukee	Milwaukee	Lake Michigan	Local history	website
South Wood County Historical Museum	Wisconsin Rapids	Wood	Central Sands Prairie	Local history	website, operated by the South Wood County Historical Society
Spinning Top & Yo-Yo Museum	Burlington	Racine	Lake Michigan	Toy	website, spinning tops, yo-yos, gyroscopes, spin toys
SS Meteor	Superior	Douglas	Lake Superior Northwoods	Ship	1896 whaleback cargo ship used on the Great Lakes until 1969, open seasonally, part of the Superior Public Museums
St. Agnes Historic Convent & School	West Bend	Washington	Southern Savanna	Historic site	Operated by the Washington County Historical Society, mid 19th-century convent and school
St. Croix Falls Historical Society Museum	St. Croix Falls	Polk	Lake Superior Northwoods	Local history	Operated by the St. Croix Falls Historical Society
Stanley Area Historical Society Museum	Stanley	Chippewa	Mississippi/Chippewa Rivers	Local history	website
Sterling North Home and Museum	Edgerton	Rock	Southern Savanna	History	Early 20th century boyhood home of author Sterling North
Stierle Bird Collection	Marshfield	Wood	Central Sands Prairie	Natural history	Over 380 birds representing 140 species and over 1,890 eggs representing 110 species, permanent exhibit housed in the Beebee Forum Room of the Marshfield Public Library
Stonefield	Cassville	Grant	Mississippi/Chippewa Rivers	Multiple	Includes late 19th century period Governor Dewey's Estate, the Wisconsin State Agricultural Museum, a recreated 1901 farmstead, a recreated early 20th-century farm village, operated by the Wisconsin Historical Society
Stony Hill School	Waubeka	Ozaukee	Lake Michigan	School	Operated by the Ozaukee County Historical Society
Stoughton Historical Society Museum	Stoughton	Dane	Southern Savanna	Local history	website
Stratford Area Historical Museum	Stratford	Marathon	Central Sands Prairie	Local history	
Sun Prairie Historical Museum	Sun Prairie	Dane	Southern Savanna	Local history	website
Superior Public Museums	Superior	Douglas	Lake Superior Northwoods	Multiple	website, includes Fairlawn Mansion, Old Firehouse & Police Museum, SS Meteor
Swiss Center of North America	New Glarus	Green	Southern Savanna	Cultural	website, Historical and cultural museum of the Swiss in North America
Swiss Historical Village	New Glarus	Green	Southern Savanna	Open-air	website, operated by the New Glarus Historical Society, replica of an 1850 Swiss settlement village
Taliesin	Spring Green	Iowa	Southern Savanna	Historic house	Tours of the early 20th century summer home of American architect Frank Lloyd Wright
Taylor County Historical Society Museum	Medford	Taylor	Lake Superior Northwoods	Local history	
Ten Chimneys	Genesee Depot	Waukesha	Southern Savanna	Historic house	Estate created by theatre legends Alfred Lunt and Lynn Fontanne
Thelma Sadoff Center for the Arts	Fond du Lac	Fond du Lac	Central Sands Prairie	Art	website, located in a former Masonic temple, regional arts center with exhibits gallery, performing arts, also houses the Children's Museum of Fond du Lac
Thorp Area Historical Museum	Thorp	Clark	Central Sands Prairie	Local history	Operated by the Thorp Area Historical Society
Three Lakes Historical Society Museum	Three Lakes	Oneida	Lake Superior Northwoods	Local history	website
Tommy Bartlett Exploratory	Wisconsin Dells	Sauk	Southern Savanna	Science	Over 150 interactive science displays
Town Hall Museum	Hebron	Jefferson	Southern Savanna	Local history	Operated by the Black River Wood Historical Society
Town of Sullivan Historical Society Museum	Sullivan	Jefferson	Southern Savanna	Local history	website
Toy Train Barn	Argyle	Lafayette	Southern Savanna	Railroad	website, model train layouts
Trimborn Farm	Greendale	Milwaukee	Lake Michigan	Open-air	Operated by the Milwaukee County Historical Society, park and mid-19th-century farm buildings
Tripp Memorial Museum	Prairie du Sac	Sauk	Southern Savanna	Local history	website, operated by the Sauk Prairie Historical Society
Trout Museum of Art	Appleton	Outagamie	Central Sands Prairie	Art	website, collection includes American, European, Asian and African paintings, sculptures and other decorative objects
Truax Prairie Home	Eau Claire	Eau Claire	Mississippi/Chippewa Rivers	Historic house	1864 farmhouse built by Peter Truax
Tufts Mansion	Neillsville	Clark	Central Sands Prairie	History	website
Two Rivers Historic Farm Museum	Two Rivers	Manitowoc	Lake Michigan	Agriculture	Operated by the Two Rivers Historical Society, historic farm equipment, tools and objects of rural life
Upham Mansion	Marshfield	Wood	Central Sands Prairie	Historic house	Mid Victorian period home of former Wisconsin governor William Henry Upham, center for the North Wood County Historical Society exhibits of local history
University of Wisconsin Space Place	Madison	Dane	Southern Savanna	Science	website, education and public outreach center of the UW-Madison Astronomy Department, space science exhibits and activities, roof top deck for sky viewing
UW–Madison Geology Museum	Madison	Dane	Southern Savanna	Natural history	Geology, fossils, dinosaurs
UWSP Museum of Natural History	Stevens Point	Portage	Central Sands Prairie	Natural history	website, located in the UWSP Albertson Center for Learning Resources, includes wildlife dioramas, fossils, rocks, geology, dinosaurs, area Native American artifacts, eggs
Van Schaick Photo Gallery Museum	Black River Falls	Jackson	Mississippi/Chippewa Rivers Region	Local history	website, operated by the Jackson County Historical Society
Vernon County Museum	Viroqua	Vernon	Mississippi/Chippewa Rivers	Local history	website, operated by the Vernon County Historical Society
Vilas County Historical Museum	Sayner	Vilas	Lake Superior Northwoods	Local history	website, operated by the Vilas County Historical Society
Villa Louis	Prairie du Chien	Crawford	Mississippi/Chippewa Rivers	Historic house	Operated by the Wisconsin Historical Society, restored late 19th century period mansion, includes Astor Fur Warehouse with exhibits about the fur trade
Villa Terrace Decorative Arts Museum	Milwaukee	Milwaukee	Lake Michigan	Art	Historic mansion, fine and decorative arts dating from the 15th to the 18th centuries
Wade House Historic Site	Greenbush	Sheboygan	Lake Michigan	Historic house	Includes the 19th century Sylvanus Wade House (a stagecoach inn), Wesley Jung Carriage Museum and a blacksmith shop
Wally Keller Tool Museum	Mt. Horeb	Dane	Southern Savanna	History	website, located in the historic Duluth Trading store, features hundreds of antique tools dating from 1865-1950 that document the history of the American working man
Washburn County Historical Museum	Shell Lake	Washburn	Lake Superior Northwoods	Local history	Artifacts of area logging, lumbering, farming, boat building and railroading, operated by the Washburn County Historical Society
Washburn County Historical Museum - Springbrook	Springbrook	Washburn	Lake Superior Northwoods	Local history	Located in the former St. Magdalene Catholic Church
Washburn Cultural Center	Washburn	Bayfield	Lake Superior Northwoods	Local history	website, includes a history museum and art gallery
Waukesha County Museum	Waukesha	Waukesha	Southern Savanna	Local history	website, operated by the Waukesha County Historical Society
Waupun Heritage Museum	Waupun	Dodge	Southern Savanna	Local history	website, operated by the Waupun Historical Society in a former Carnegie library
Waushara County Historical Museum	Wautoma	Waushara	Central Sands Prairie	Local history	Located in the former county jail, operated by the Waushara County Historical Society, includes a school room, period rooms, county store, jail cells, doctors' room, dispatcher's office
Waswagoning Re-Created Ojibwe Village	Lac du Flambeau	Vilas	Lake Superior Northwoods	Living	website
Webster House Museum	Elkhorn	Walworth	Southern Savanna	Historic house	website, operated by the Walworth County Historical Society, features Civil War and Victorian period items
Weis Earth Science Museum	Menasha	Calumet	Central Sands Prairie	Geology	website, part of University of Wisconsin–Fox Valley, minerals, fossils, geology
West Allis Historical Museum	West Allis	Milwaukee	Lake Michigan	History	Local history, culture, household items
West Shore Fishing Museum	Menominee	Menominee	Central Sands Prairie	Industry	website, restored commercial fisheries buildings and exhibits, located in Bailey Park
Western Union Junction Railroad Museum	Sturtevant	Racine	Lake Michigan	Railway	Open on Sundays, railroad artifacts
White Lake Area Historical Society Depot Museum	White Lake	Langlade	Lake Superior Northwoods	History	
White Pillars Museum	De Pere	Brown	Lake Michigan	Local history	website, operated by the De Pere Historical Society
Whitewater Historical Museum	Whitewater	Jefferson	Southern Savanna	Local history	website, operated by the Whitewater Historical Society
Wild Rose Historical Society Museum	Wild Rose	Waushara	Central Sands Prairie	Open-air	Includes the 1880s-period Elisha Stewart House, a smoke house, a carriage house and blacksmith shop, a bank and a country Progressive school house
Wilson Place Museum	Menomonie	Dunn	Mississippi/Chippewa Rivers	Historic house	Victorian home of prominent local families, reflect three generations family history and its original family furnishings including crystal, china, furniture, silver fabrics and clothing
Wind Point Light	Wind Point	Racine	Lake Michigan	Maritime	History of the lighthouse, Racine and Great Lakes maritime history, tower to climb
Wingspread	Wind Point	Racine	Lake Michigan	Historic house	Late 1930s house designed by Frank Lloyd Wright
Winneconne Historical Society Museum	Winneconne	Winnebago	Central Sands Prairie	Open-air	website, includes 1871 Winneconne railroad depot, turn of the century "Little House," 1889 one-room schoolhouse, Kay Wilde Doll Cottage and Steamboat Museum
Wisconsin American Legion State Headquarters and Museum	Portage	Columbia	Southern Savanna	Military	website, memorabilia about veterans and the Wisconsin American Legion
Wisconsin Automotive Museum	Hartford	Dodge	Southern Savanna	Transportation - Automobile	website, features over 100 classic, vintage autos and automotive artifacts
Wisconsin Black Historical Society and Museum	Milwaukee	Milwaukee	Lake Michigan	Ethnic - African American	website, city and state African American history
Wisconsin Bowhunter's Museum	Clintonville	Ozaukee	Lake Michigan	Sports - Bow hunting	website
Wisconsin Canoe Heritage Museum	Spooner	Washburn	Lake Superior Northwoods	Maritime	History of the North American canoe
Wisconsin Concrete Park	Phillips	Price	Lake Superior Northwoods	Art - Sculpture park	Outdoor sculpture park containing 237 embellished concrete sculptures
Wisconsin Cranberry Discovery Center	Warrens	Monroe	Central Sands Prairie	Food	website, cranberry industry and history of Wisconsin cranberries
Wisconsin Governor's Mansion	Maple Bluff	Dane	Southern Savanna	Historic house	Also known as the Wisconsin Executive Residence
Wisconsin Historical Museum	Madison	Dane	Southern Savanna	History	Operated by the Wisconsin Historical Society, state history and culture from the Ice Age to the present
Wisconsin Hockey Hall of Fame	Eagle River	Vilas	Lake Superior Northwoods	Sports	Major figures in state amateur ice hockey
Wisconsin Maritime Museum	Manitowoc	Manitowoc	Lake Michigan	Maritime	Great Lakes maritime history, original artifacts and nautical archaeology, USS Cobia (SS-245) submarine. Website
Wisconsin Museum of Quilts & Fiber Arts	Cedarburg	Ozaukee	Lake Michigan	Textiles	website
Wisconsin Museum of International Wildlife	Appleton	Outagamie	Central Sands Prairie	Natural history	Mounted wildlife
Wisconsin National Guard Memorial Library and Museum	Camp Douglas	Juneau	Central Sands Prairie	Military	
Wisconsin River Papermaking Museum	Wisconsin Rapids	Wood	Central Sands Prairie	Industry	Papermaking history in the Wisconsin River valley and particularly history of the Consolidated Water Power & Paper Company
Wisconsin Science Museum	Madison	Dane	Southern Savanna	STEM	Museum exhibits, activities and art inspire STEM interest and appreciation. We celebrate Homegrown Discoveries – the achievements of Wisconsinites.
Wisconsin State Capitol	Madison	Dane	Southern Savanna	Historic site	Tours available
Wisconsin State Firefighters Memorial	Wisconsin Rapids	Wood	Central Sands Prairie	Firefighting	Park and visitor center museum dedicated to firefighters from the state of Wisconsin who have died in the line of duty
Wisconsin Veterans Museum	Madison	Dane	Southern Savanna	Military	Personal items and military memorabilia of state veterans
Wisconsin Veterans Museum	Waupaca	Waupaca	Central Sands Prairie	Military	
Wustum Museum	Racine	Racine	Lake Michigan	Art	Also known as Charles A. Wustum Museum of Fine Arts, branch of the Racine Art Museum, exhibits of fine art and craft media, also 13 acres of park, a one-acre formal garden
Wright Museum of Art	Beloit	Rock	Southern Savanna	Art	Teaching museum of Beloit College, collections include American Impressionism, Modernist paintings, 19th century plaster casts, German Expressionism, and Japanese Modern prints
Wriston Art Center	Appleton	Outagamie	Central Sands Prairie	Art	website, part of Lawrence University, includes Leech, Hoffmaster, and Kohler Galleries

== Defunct museums ==
- American UFO and Sci-Fi Museum, Wisconsin Dells
- Artasia Gallery & Museum, Milwaukee
- Carl's Wood Art Museum, Eagle River, Roadside America report
- Chudnow Museum of Yesteryear in Milwaukee, closed December 2020, bulk of artifacts transferred to Cedarburg History Museum
- Fairfield Art Center, Sturgeon Bay(Story on closure)
- Fort Bon Secours, Cadott
- The Hideout - Al Capone's Northwoods Retreat, Couderay
- Kickapoo Indian Caverns, Wauzeka, included a Native American museum
- Little Norway, Wisconsin, Blue Mounds, closed in 2012
- Madison Museum of Bathroom Tissue
- Museum of Norman Rockwell Art, Reedsburg, Reedsburg information about museum
- Rudy Rotter's Museum of Sculpture, Manitowoc
- Swarthout Museum, La Crosse, formerly operated by the La Crosse County Historical Society
- Thunderbird Museum, Merrilan, Roadside America - closed report
- Watson's Wild West Museum, Old west general store with American West artifacts, closed November 2018
- William F. Eisner Museum of Advertising & Design, Milwaukee, closed in 2010

== Regions defined ==
The Wisconsin Department of Natural Resources (WDNR) has defined five tourism regions of Wisconsin as follows below:

=== Central Sands Prairie Region ===
Counties in the central area: Adams, Calumet, Clark, Fond du Lac, Green Lake, Juneau, Marathon, Marquette, Menominee, Monroe, Outagamie, Portage, Shawano, Waupaca, Waushara, Winnebago, Wood

=== Lake Michigan Region ===
Counties in the eastern area along Lake Michigan, including the Door Peninsula: Brown, Door, Kenosha, Kewaunee, Manitowoc, Marinette, Marathon, Marquette, Menominee, Milwaukee, Oconto, Ozaukee, Racine, Sheboygan

=== Lake Superior Northwoods Region ===
Counties in the north central and northwest area: Ashland, Barron, Bayfield, Burnett, Douglas, Florence, Forest, Iron, Langlade, Lincoln, Oneida, Polk, Price, Rusk, Sawyer, Taylor, Vilas, Washburn

=== Mississippi/Chippewa Rivers Region ===
South central and southwest area along the Mississippi and Chippewa rivers: Buffalo, Chippewa, Crawford, Dunn, Eau Claire, Grant, Jackson, La Crosse, Pepin, Pierce, St. Croix, Trempealeau, Vernon

=== Southern Savanna Region ===
South central area: Columbia, Dane, Dodge, Green, Iowa, Jefferson, Lafayette, Richland, Rock, Sauk, Walworth, Washington, Waukesha

== See also ==
- Nature Centers in Wisconsin
- Observatories in Wisconsin (category)
- List of historical societies in Wisconsin
