= Brandon Village Historic District =

Brandon Village Historic District may refer to:

- Brandon Village (Brandon, South Dakota), a historic district listed on the NRHP in South Dakota
- Brandon Village Historic District (Brandon, Vermont), listed on the NRHP in Vermont
- Brandon Village Hall and Library, Brandon, Wisconsin, listed on the NRHP in Wisconsin
