= Colfax Railroad Museum =

Museum in Colfax, Wisconsin, US

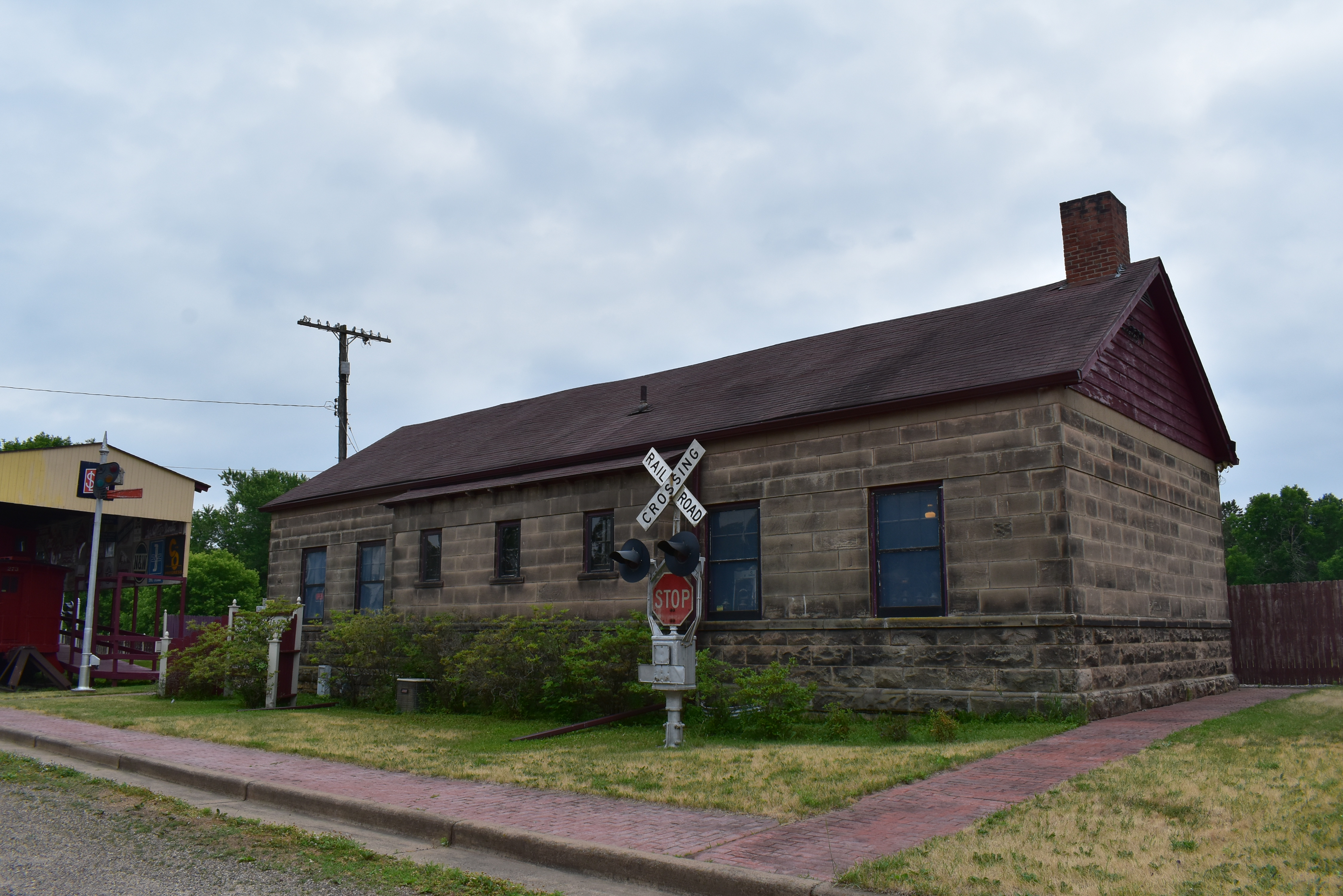
- Location: 500 E Railroad Ave, Colfax, Wisconsin, 54730
- Coordinates: 44.997311°N 91.725025°W
- Type: Railway Museum
- Website: https://www.colfaxrrmuseum.org/

The Colfax Railroad Museum is a railroad museum in Colfax, Wisconsin housed in the 1914 Sandstone Minneapolis, St. Paul and Sault Ste. Marie Railroad Depot.

== Collection ==
The museum houses a collection of equipment from railroads that served western Wisconsin and eastern Minnesota. The collection includes Soo Line caboose number 273, Barney and Smith Car Company heavyweight coach number 991, and Soo Line GP30 number 703, and other cars.

The depot houses the large collection of railroad lanterns, railroad china, and the nation's largest railroad paperweight collection. Exhibits in the museum illustrate the items of material culture that people encountered in their day-to-day activities with the railroads and how technology changed over time.

=== Steam locomotives ===
Locomotive	Type	Built	Retired	Acquired	Status	Image
Coronet Phosphate #5	2-6-2ST 'Prairie'	1911	?	2014	Static Display	

=== Diesel locomotives ===
Locomotive	Type	Built	Retired	Acquired	Status	Image
Soo Line #703	EMD GP30	1963	1998	?	Static Display	

=== Passenger cars ===
Railroad Company	Operating Number	Car Name	Car Type	Status
Chicago, St. Paul, Minneapolis and Omaha	301		Railroad Post Office	Static Display
Milwaukee Road	917202		Baggage	Static Display
Northern Pacific	950		Coach	Static Display
Soo Line	991		Coach	Static Display

=== Freight cars ===
- Soo Line, Boxcar #36400

=== Cabooses ===
- Milwaukee Road #X00127
- Minneapolis, Northfield & Southern #018
- Soo Line #256
- Soo Line #273

=== MoW equipment ===
Canadian National Speeder #154-33

== History ==
The museum is housed in the third depot to be built in the village. Built from sandstone quarried nearby, this building was constructed between 1914 and 1915 on the foundation of the second depot, which had previously been moved off the site to serve as a personal residence.

In 1958, a large storm tore through western Wisconsin, producing many tornadoes, one of which hit the freighthouse on the depot's west side. The wall of the women's waiting room was rebuilt from the rubble, but the freight house was never restored.

== See also ==
- List of museums in Wisconsin

Preceding station	Soo Line	Following station
Wheeler toward Portal	Main Line	Chippewa Falls toward Chicago
