= National Bobblehead Hall of Fame and Museum =

Museum

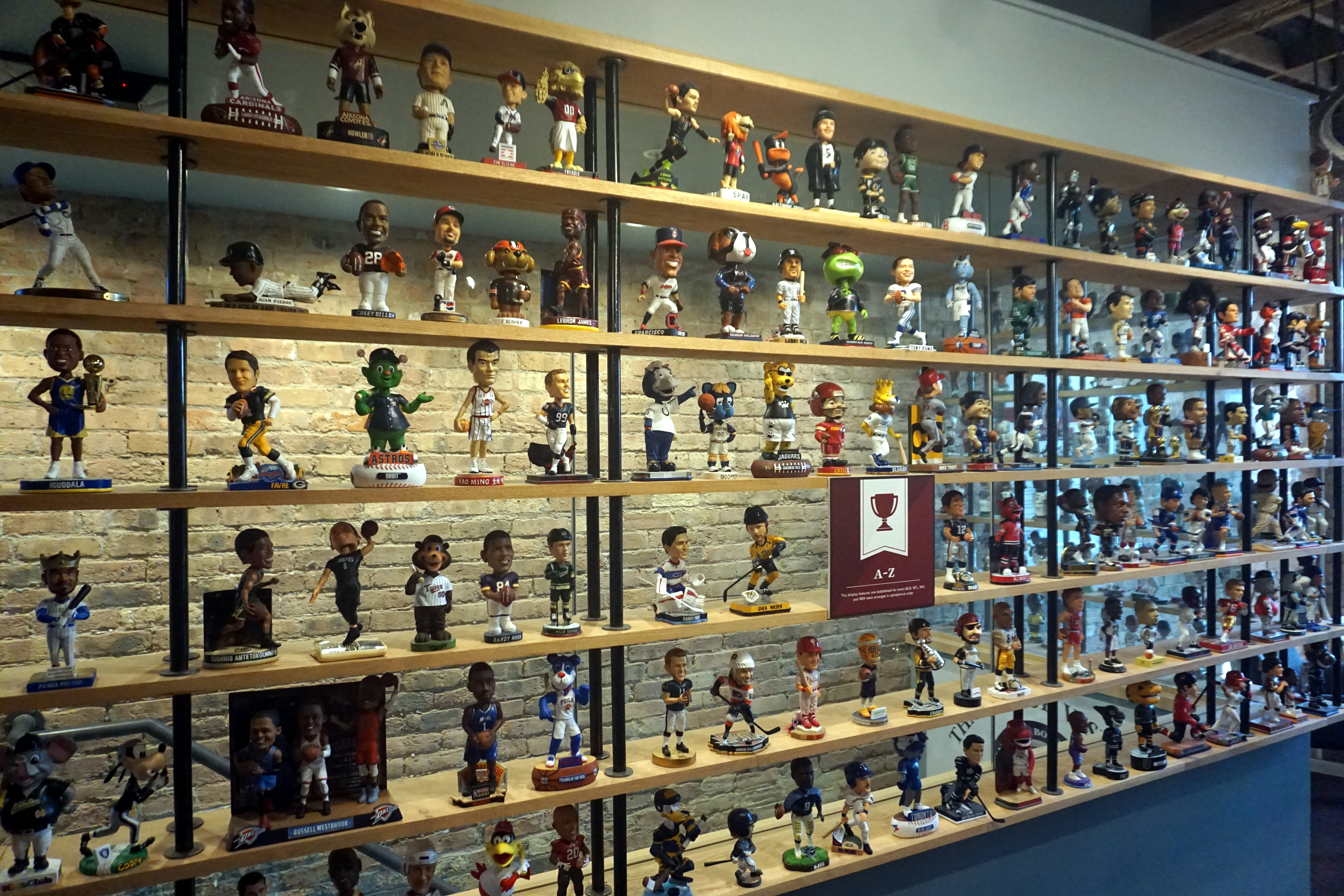
- Interior of the National Bobblehead Hall of Fame and Museum
- Location: 170C S 1st St 2nd Floor, Milwaukee, WI 53204
- Coordinates: 43°01′46.8″N 87°54′38.0″W
- Type: History museum
- Collection size: World's largest bobblehead collection
- Public transit access: MCTS
- Website: www.bobbleheadhall.com

The National Bobblehead Hall of Fame and Museum is a museum devoted to bobblehead dolls. It is located in Milwaukee, Wisconsin. The museum claims to have 10,000 different bobbleheads from around the world, including a life-size bobblehead. It is the only bobblehead-specific museum in the world.

== History ==
The museum was established in 2014 by Brad Novak and Phil Sklar. The museum did not find a permanent location in Milwaukee until 2017. When the Guinness Book of Records certifies the museum's bobblehead collection, it is expected to surpass the current record holder Phil Darling who was certified to have 2,396 bobbleheads. The museum often makes bobbleheads for current events such as "Alligator Rob and Chance the Snapper"; in 2019 the museum made a bobblehead for a Carson King of Iowa, who was featured on ESPN's College GameDay. Sales of his bobblehead will generate donations for University of Iowa Stead Family Children’s Hospital.

== Notable bobbleheads ==
- In 2016 the museum produced a three foot tall bobblehead of NBA Basketball player LeBron James.
- 2016: Cam Newton dabbing Bobblehead
- 2018 :Jake Arrieta MLB pitcher (in honor of his no-hitter)
- Home Alone bobbleheads featuring Kevin McCallister and "The Wet Bandits."
- Three-foot tall Milwaukee Bucks Giannis Antetokounmpo
- Negro Leagues Centennial Bobblehead Series.

== See also ==
- List of museums in Wisconsin
