= Pendarves =

Pendarves is a Cornish surname. Notable people with the surname include:

- Alexander Pendarves, Cornish politician
- John Pendarves, Cornish Puritan controversialist
- Edward Wynne-Pendarves, Cornish politician
- Mary Pendarves, English artist, letter-writer, and bluestocking

Other uses

- The Pendarves estate at Troon, Cornwall
- Pendarves Wood, a Cornwall Wildlife Trust nature reserve

== See also ==
- Pendarvis
