= Dells Mill =

- U.S. National Register of Historic Places
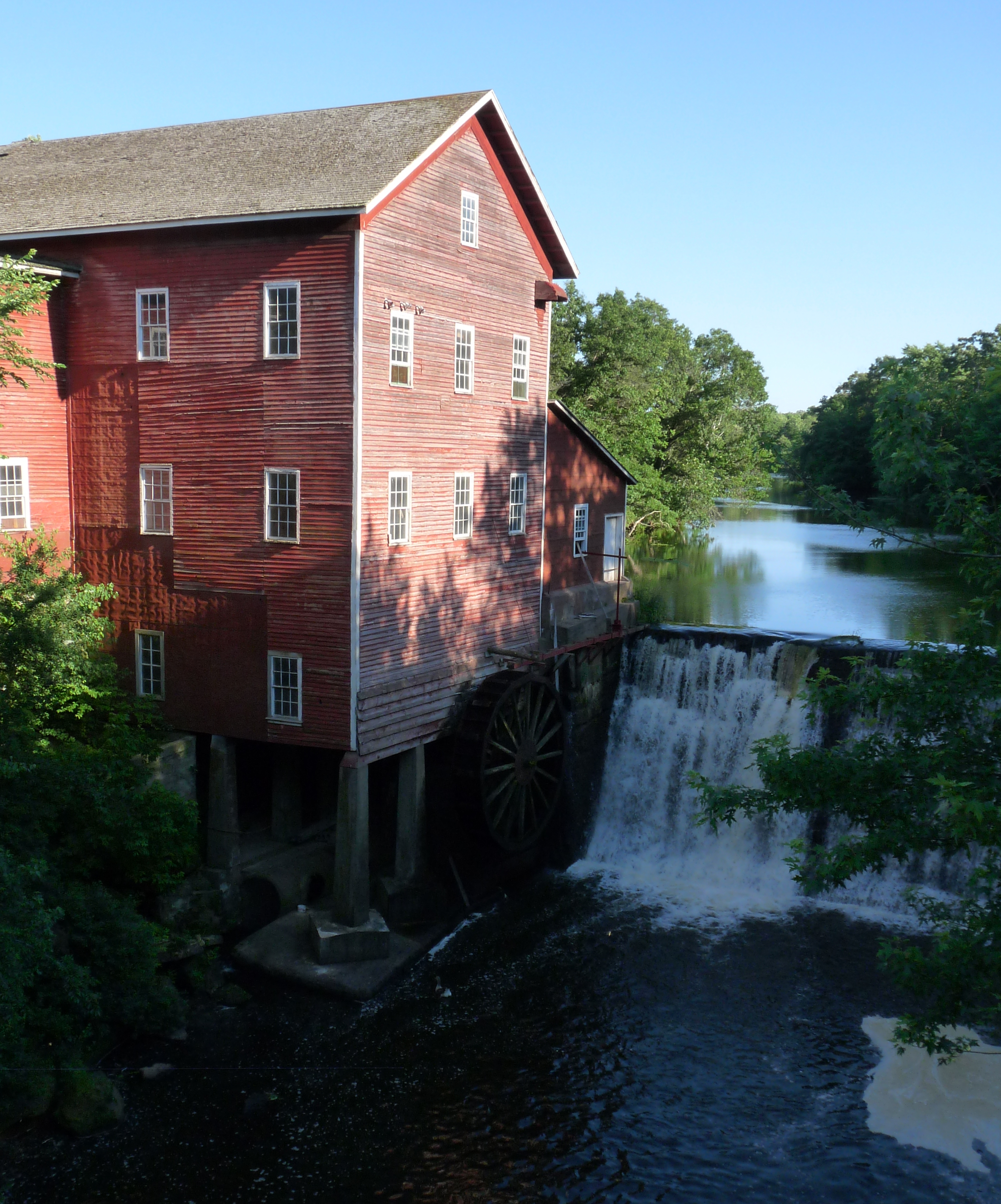
- Dells Mill

- Location within Wisconsin
- Location: E18855 County Rd. V Augusta, Wisconsin
- Coordinates: 44.72549°N 91.14876°W
- Built: 1864
- NRHP reference No.: 74000086
- Added to NRHP: December 24, 1974

The Dells Mill is located in Augusta, Wisconsin, United States. It was added to the National Register of Historic Places in 1974.

== History ==
The structure was built as a gristmill. A mill pond was created near-by. Currently, the site is used as a museum.

The mill was taken over by an Amish man recently, with volunteer help from a descendant of the most recent owners back in the 1980s. The family member gives tours and answers questions, in addition to helping with sales at the small store. You can buy various flours and oats ground in the still-functional mill there, and also local Amish wood products. There is a small antiques section, and various other Amish products, such as jams and jellies, can be purchased also.
