= Pendarvis =

Pendarvis is a surname. Notable people with the surname include:

- Albert Pendarvis, minister
- Cleotis Pendarvis (born 1986), boxer
- Janice Pendarvis, American singer, songwriter, and voiceover artist
- Leon Pendarvis (born 1945), American musician
- Marvin R. Pendarvis (born 1989), American politician
- Paul Pendarvis (1907–1987), American musician

== See also ==
- Pendarves
- Pendarvis Williams (born 1991), basketball player
- Pendarvis (Mineral Point, Wisconsin), historic site in Wisconsin
