= Kneeland-Walker House =

Historic house in Wisconsin, United States

- U.S. National Register of Historic Places
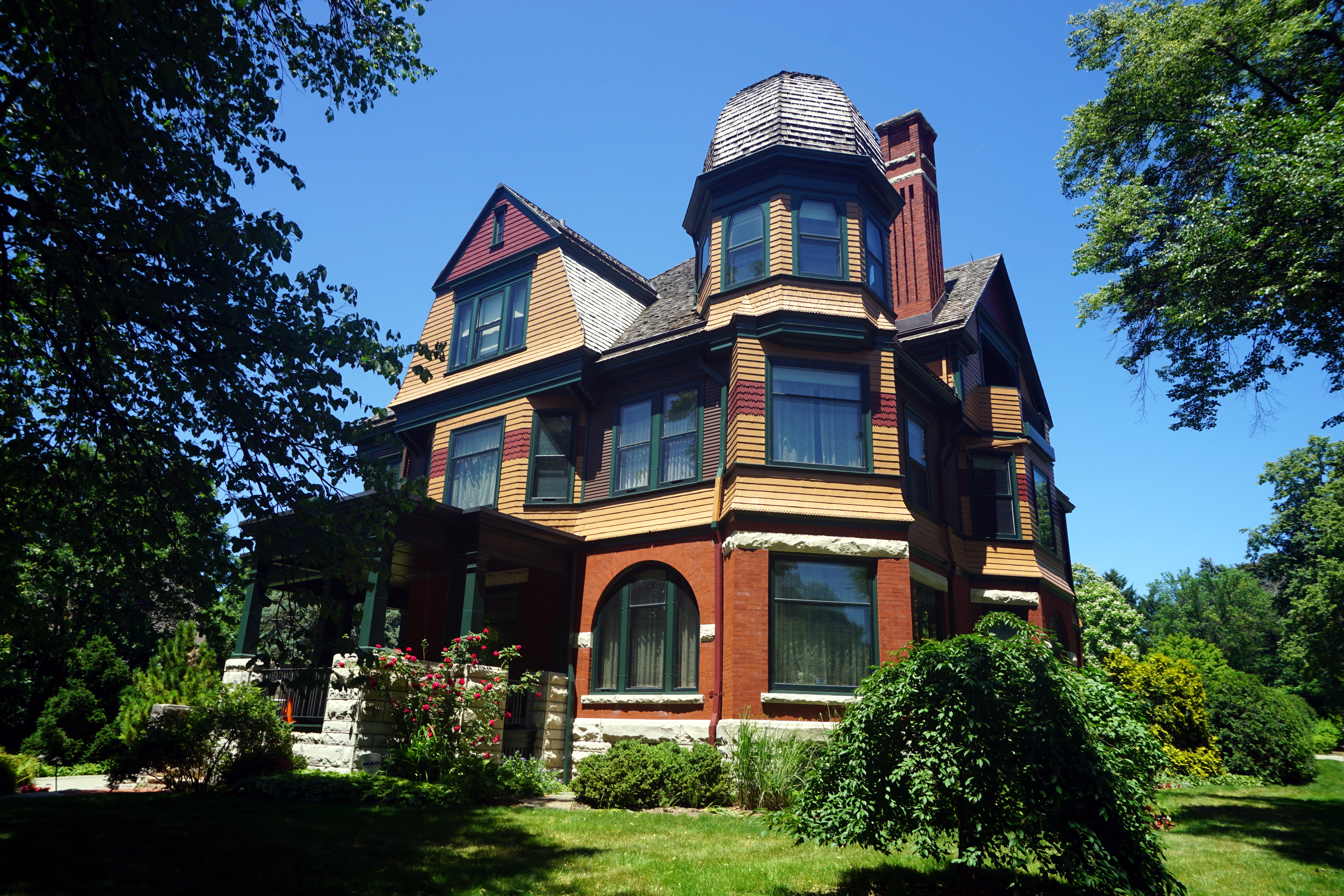

- Location within Wisconsin Location within the United States
- Location: 7406 Hillcrest Dr. Wauwatosa, Wisconsin
- Coordinates: 43°30′20″N 88°00′18″W
- Built: 1890
- Architectural style: Queen Anne
- NRHP reference No.: 88003212
- Added to NRHP: January 19, 1989

The Kneeland-Walker House is a 3-story mansion built in 1890 in Wauwatosa, Wisconsin, styled Queen Anne with Shingle style influence. Still largely intact, and possibly the finest example of Queen Anne architecture in Wauwatosa, it was added to the National Register of Historic Places in 1989.

== History ==
Norman L. Kneeland was born in 1832 in New York and educated there. After serving in the Civil War, he moved to Wisconsin in 1865 and bought a 100-acre farm from his father and uncle. He prospered and in 1889 sold the farm, which was later developed into Washington Park. Shortly after, Kneeland bought six lots on Hillcrest Drive, at that time called Center Street, and built the house.

The house is three stories tall, with a three-story onion-domed tower on one corner and a porte-cochère on the west side. It sits on a limestone foundation with the first floor clad in brick, the second in weatherboard, and the third in wooden shingles. A large gambrel-roofed dormer tops the front of the house and a tall fluted chimney rises behind the tower. Inside the house are oak pocket doors and a staircase leading up to the second floor. Behind the house is a carriage house with stalls for four horses. Also in the back yard is a small building which was a cider shed when an orchard surrounded the house during the Kneeland era.

While living in the house, James Kneeland was active in city politics. He was president of the city council at his death in 1900. The house stayed in the Kneeland family until 1917. In that year, the house was purchased by Emery L. Walker, an engineer for the Kieckhefer Container Company, which made cardboard boxes. The Walkers lived in the house until 1985.

The Wauwatosa Historical Society purchased the house from Constance Walker in 1987. It is now their headquarters and a museum. Additionally, it has been designated a Wauwatosa Landmark and a Milwaukee County Landmark.
