= Spectrum Industries =

Furniture company in Chippewa Falls, Wisconsin, USA

Spectrum Industries, Inc.
- Company type: Private
- Founded: 1968
- Headquarters: Chippewa Falls, Wisconsin United States
- Products: Furniture

Spectrum Industries is a small business based in Chippewa Falls, Wisconsin that designs and manufactures furniture for learning environments.

== Company history ==
The company originated in Chippewa Falls on March 29, 1968, as Cygnet Films. Cygnet Films made promotion films and training films for a variety of customers from the startup American Basketball Association to the United States Armed Forces. Cygnet changed its name to Spectrum Industries Inc, in June 1969.

The film business introduced Spectrum to the education market and also to the Hubbard Scientific Company. Spectrum acquired Hubbard Scientific in July 1975.

In the late 1980s the Manufacturing Division was manufacturing store fixtures and displays, solid oak furniture, office furniture and computer workstations. In the 1990s the corporate office was moved to Chippewa Falls, Wisconsin. In June, 1991, Hubbard Scientific was sold.

In 1991, Spectrum designed and manufactured furniture for personal computers.

Spectrum expanded its Chippewa Falls facilities in December 2005. A 125,000-square-foot (11,600 m^{2}) building was purchased for metal fabrication, powder-coating and assemble-to-order product lines.
