= Angel Museum =

- Established: 1 May 1998
- Dissolved: 29 September 2018
- Location: 656 Pleasant St, Beloit, Wisconsin
- Type: Private museum
- Key holdings: Oprah Winfrey Black Angel Collection
- Collection size: 13,600
- Public transit access: Beloit Transit
- Website: angelmuseum.org

The Angel Museum was a museum in Beloit, Wisconsin devoted to the collection and display of angel figurines. Founded in 1998, the museum was housed in the former St. Paul's Catholic Church along the Rock River. The museum closed its doors in 2018 due to insufficient funding.

== History ==
Joyce Berg, the founder of the museum, began collecting angels in 1976, first acquiring an Italian bisque figurine of two angels on a seesaw. By 1994, her collection was noticed by the National Enquirer, who wrote about her under the headline, "Heavens above! Grandma's living with 10,455 angels."

The museum itself was first conceived in 1995 (Note: Other accounts have placed the conception of the museum at earlier dates. Berg claimed it was 1993 in a 2018 interview and Antlfinger wrote it was 1994 in a 2002 article.) when Berg ran out of room for her collection and began seeking a new place to house it. Around the same time, Beloit's St. Paul's Catholic Church was being threatened with demolition to make way for a new development. Berg chose the church, and with the help of Beloit citizens the church was converted into a museum. It opened on May 1, 1998, with an annual rent of $1 to the City of Beloit. For special visits to the museum, Berg sometimes wore an angel costume including cherub socks, angel earrings, a halo and wings.

The museum closed in 2018 after being open 20 years. In a letter to the community, the museum's board of trustees wrote: "We do not have sufficient funds, memberships, corporate sponsors, or volunteers to staff and operate the museum." The museum's collections were auctioned in October 2018 through Beloit Auction & Realty Inc. In 2019, the City of Beloit had made plans to convert St. Paul's Catholic Church into an event venue.

== Collections ==
The Angel Museum claimed to have the largest private collection of angel figurines, and the museum's collection was cited by the Guinness Book of World Records in 2001 as the largest of its kind. By December 2008, the collection numbered over 13,600, with approximately 10,000 on display in the museum on permanent loan from Berg. The angels are from more than 60 countries and range in size from thimble dimensions to more than 5 feet (1.5 m) tall. In addition to porcelain, glass, copper, and acrylic, materials include lambskin, corn husks, tree roots, and spaghetti. Two concrete angels weighing 100 pounds (45 kg) each stand in front of the building.

The museum was also notable for having housed Oprah Winfrey's collection of 571 black angel figurines. (Note: Some sources indicate Winfrey's donation later exceeded 1,000 figurines.) During a 1997 episode of the Oprah Winfrey Show, Winfrey told Cher that black angel figurines were difficult to find. Winfrey's fans then began sending her figurines in significant numbers, and Winfrey had to ask her fans to stop. Winfrey donated her collection to the Angel Museum later in 1997, shortly before the museum was set to open. Others had donated angels to the museum as well, often as memorials to loved ones.

In 2018, Beloit Auction Service, Inc. sold the contents of the Angel Museum including the world famous Berg Angel Collection. The Visit Beloit organization has since repurposed the building.
