= Haese Memorial Village Historic District =

Historic district in Wisconsin, United States

- U.S. National Register of Historic Places
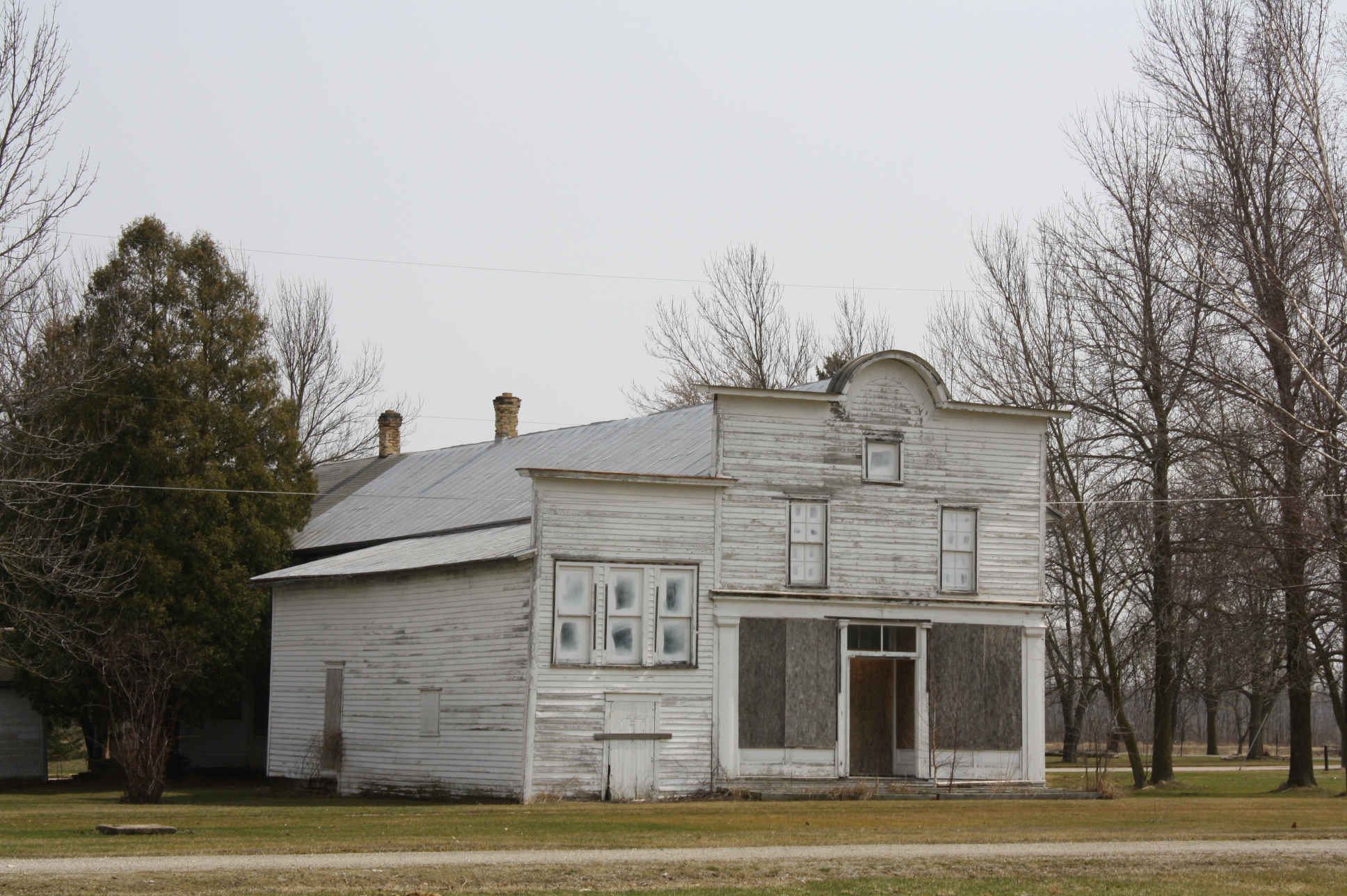
- Haese General Store
- Location: Milwaukee and Randolph Sts, Forest Junction, Wisconsin
- Coordinates: 44°12′28″N 88°08′32″W
- Area: 1.6 acres (0.65 ha)
- Built: 1874
- Architectural style: Early Commercial
- NRHP reference No.: 82000641
- Added to NRHP: March 2, 1982

The Haese Memorial Village Historic District is located in Forest Junction, Wisconsin.

== History ==
The site is a remnant business district of a town that formed where two railroads crossed, then withered as logging faded, as the automobile replaced the train, and as Appleton grew. Structures include the 1884 Haese General Store, the 1908 Hunt hardware store, a summer kitchen, and the 1908 Haese gas station.

Currently, the site serves as a museum. It was listed on the National Register of Historic Places in 1982 and on the State Register of Historic Places in 1989.
