= Hollenstein Wagon and Carriage Factory =

- U.S. National Register of Historic Places
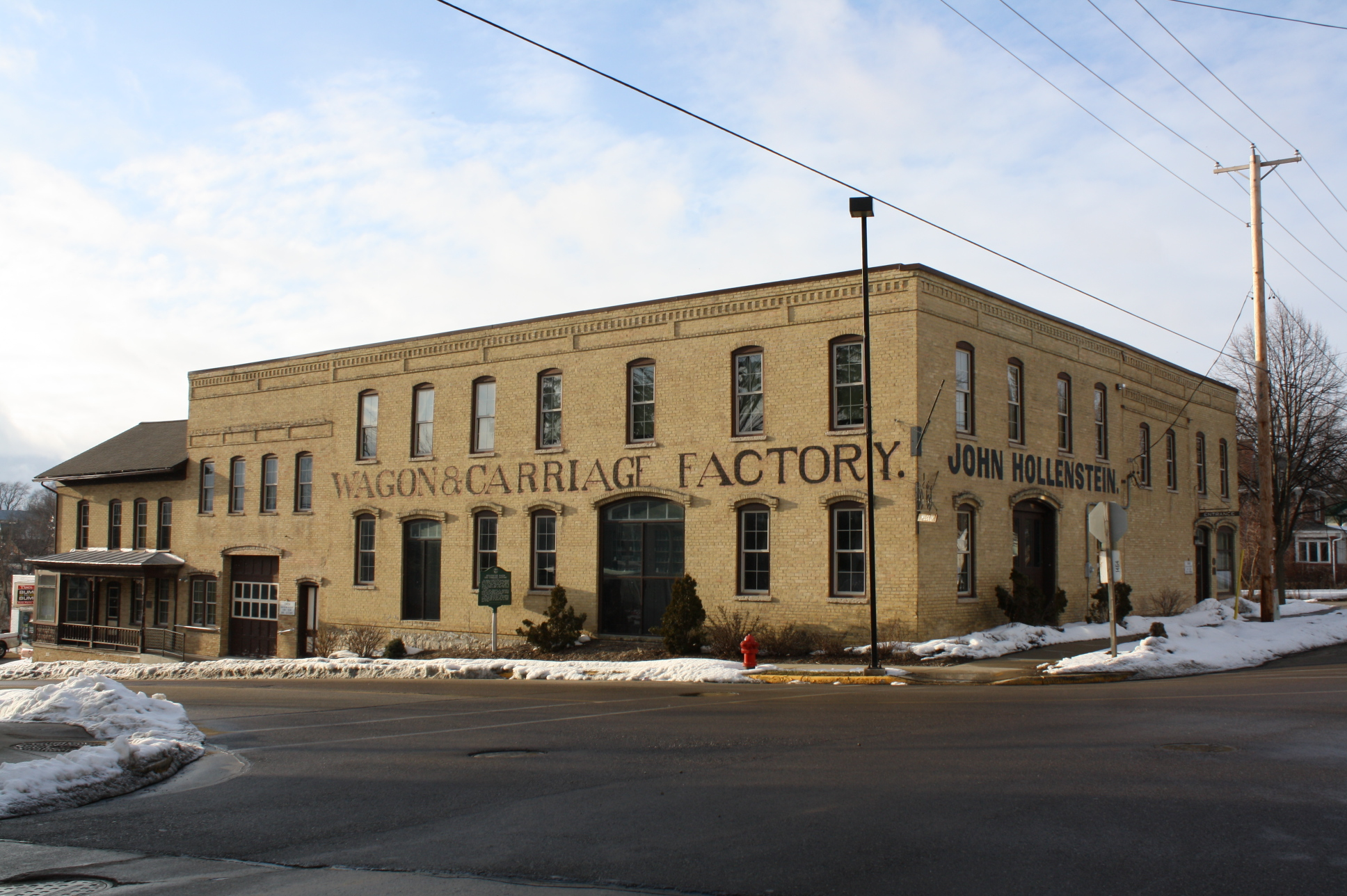
- Hollenstein Wagon and Carriage Factory

- Location within Wisconsin Location within the United States
- Location: Mayville, Wisconsin
- Coordinates: 43.496°N 88.54231°W
- Built: 1876
- NRHP reference No.: 79000070
- Added to NRHP: July 27, 1979

The Hollenstein Wagon and Carriage Factory is located in Mayville, Wisconsin. It was added to the National Register of Historic Places in 1979.

== History ==
The factory was built by John J. Hollenstein, Sr. and his wife, Dominica, who moved to the United States from Switzerland. In addition to being a factory, the building also served as the Hollenstein's home. Hollenstein ran the business until 1908, when he sold the factory to his son. Afterwards, the building was bought and sold by multiple owners and served various purposes.

It is now the Hollenstein Wagon & Carriage Factory Museum of the Mayville Historical Society.
