= Center Valley Grade School =

- U.S. National Register of Historic Places
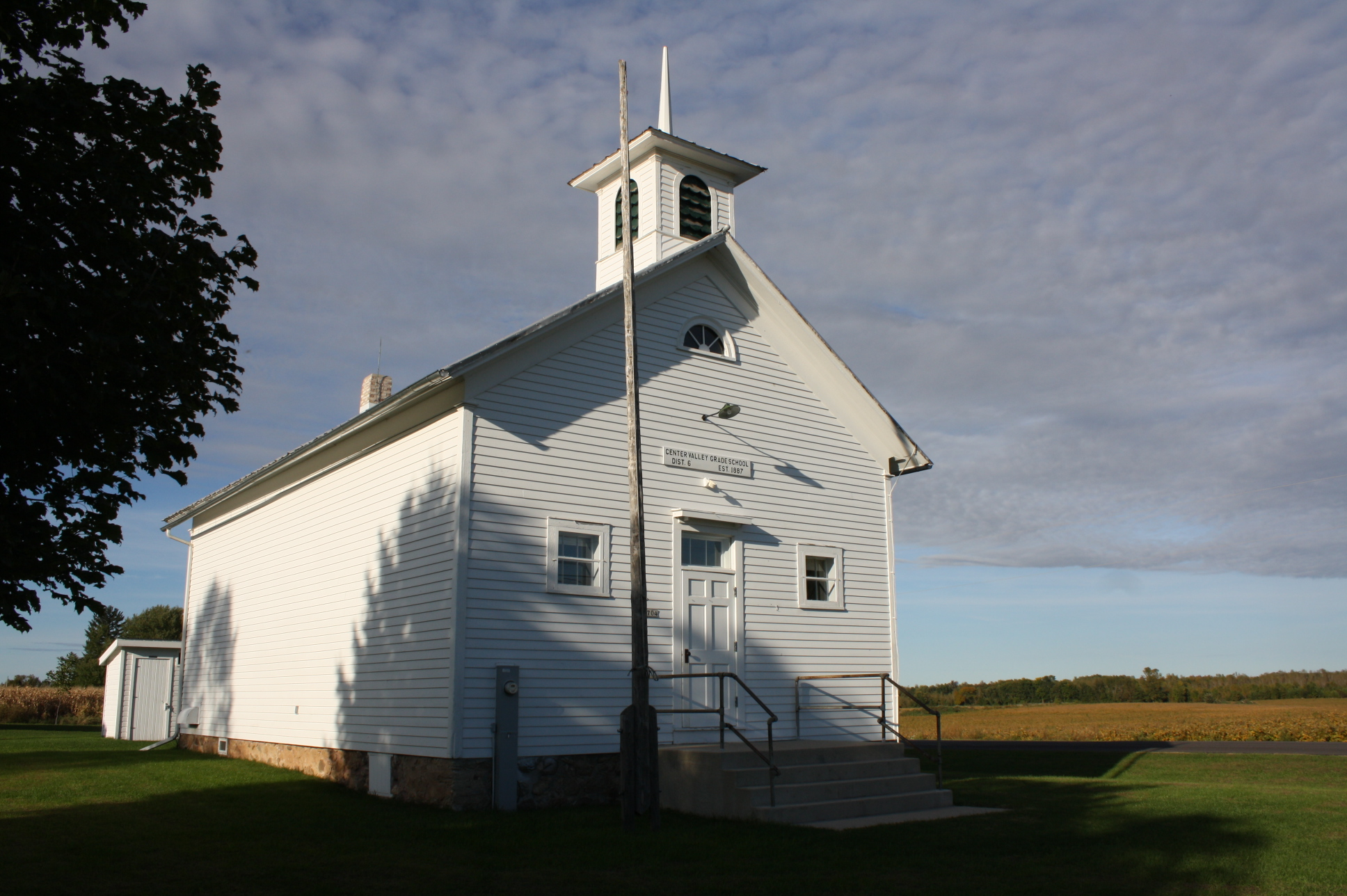
- Center Valley Grade School

- Location within Wisconsin Location within the United States
- Location: Center, Outagamie County, Wisconsin
- Coordinates: 44°24′9″N 88°28′33″W
- Built: 1888
- NRHP reference No.: 11000162
- Added to NRHP: April 8, 2011

Center Valley Grade School is a museum and former one-room school in Center, Outagamie County, Wisconsin. It was added to the National Register of Historic Places in 2011.

== History ==
During the nineteenth century, Center Valley Grade School was one of seven one-room schools serving Center. It closed in the 1950s after Wisconsin eliminated one-room schools.

In 2000, the Friends of the Center Valley Grade School purchased the building. The group spent seven years restoring the building and returning it to the appearance it had during the 1940s. It is open for scheduled tours.
