= Alexander House Center for Art & History =

Alexander House
- Established: 1991
- Location: Port Edwards, Wisconsin
- Coordinates: 44.35375°N 89.85982°W
- Type: Art Museum; History Museum
- Website: www.alexanderhouseonline.org

The Alexander House is an art gallery and local history museum in Port Edwards, Wisconsin, in the United States. The exhibits include local history, lumbering and papermaking industries, as well as changing exhibits from local, state, Midwestern and nationally prominent artists.

== History ==
The Alexander House was founded by members of the Alexander Charitable Foundation of Port Edwards in 1990 as a location for the extensive historical collection of the former Nekoosa-Edwards Paper Company. The Foundation was named after the late John E. Alexander, who was Chief Executive with the paper company for many years, and whose father and grandfather were instrumental in establishing the lumbering and paper industry in central Wisconsin.

In the short time since the gallery opened in 1991, tens of thousands of people have visited the art and history displays. Hundreds of artists have displayed their artwork in the main level gallery. They have included local, state, Midwestern and nationally prominent artists.

== Gallery ==
In addition to the art displays, the second floor of the Alexander House features a collection of historical materials that were originally on display or in storage at Nekoosa-Edwards Paper Company. This material is displayed in four different rooms, including one devoted to early lumbering, another to the history of papermaking, and the other two to the founding families and communities in which they settled.
