= H. S. Miller Bank =

- U.S. National Register of Historic Places
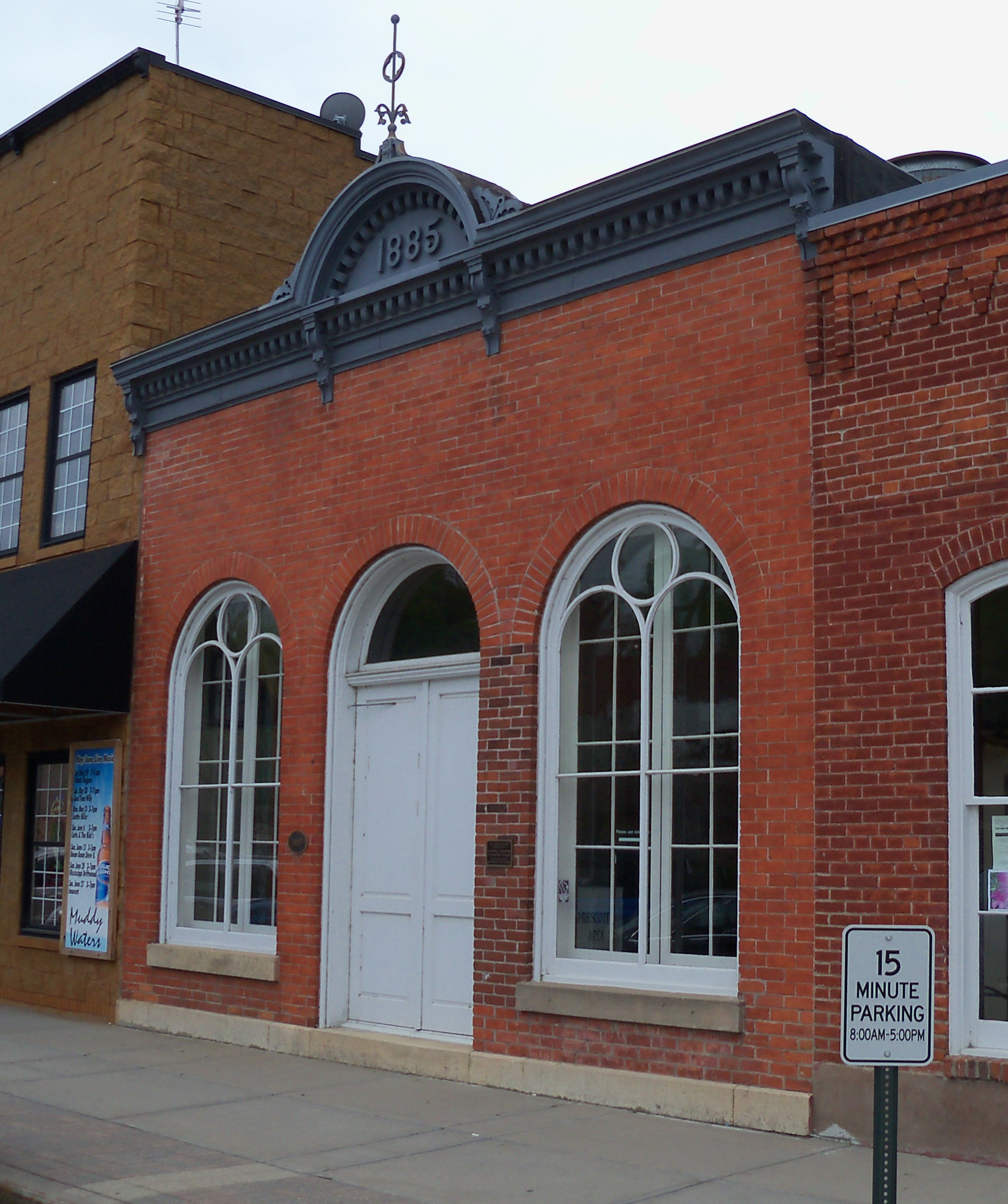
- H. S. Miller Bank

- Location within Wisconsin Location within the United States
- Location: 223 Broad St. Prescott, Wisconsin
- Coordinates: 44°44′59″N 92°48′8″W
- Area: less than one acre
- Built: 1885
- Architectural style: Romanesque/Italianate
- NRHP reference No.: 94000998
- Added to NRHP: August 19, 1994

H. S. Miller Bank is located in Prescott, Wisconsin. In addition to being a bank, the building also served as the city hall and was added to the National Register of Historic Places in 1994.

Currently, it houses the Prescott Historical Society Museum and the local chamber of commerce.
