= Mueller-Wright House =

Historic house in Wisconsin, United States

- U.S. National Register of Historic Places
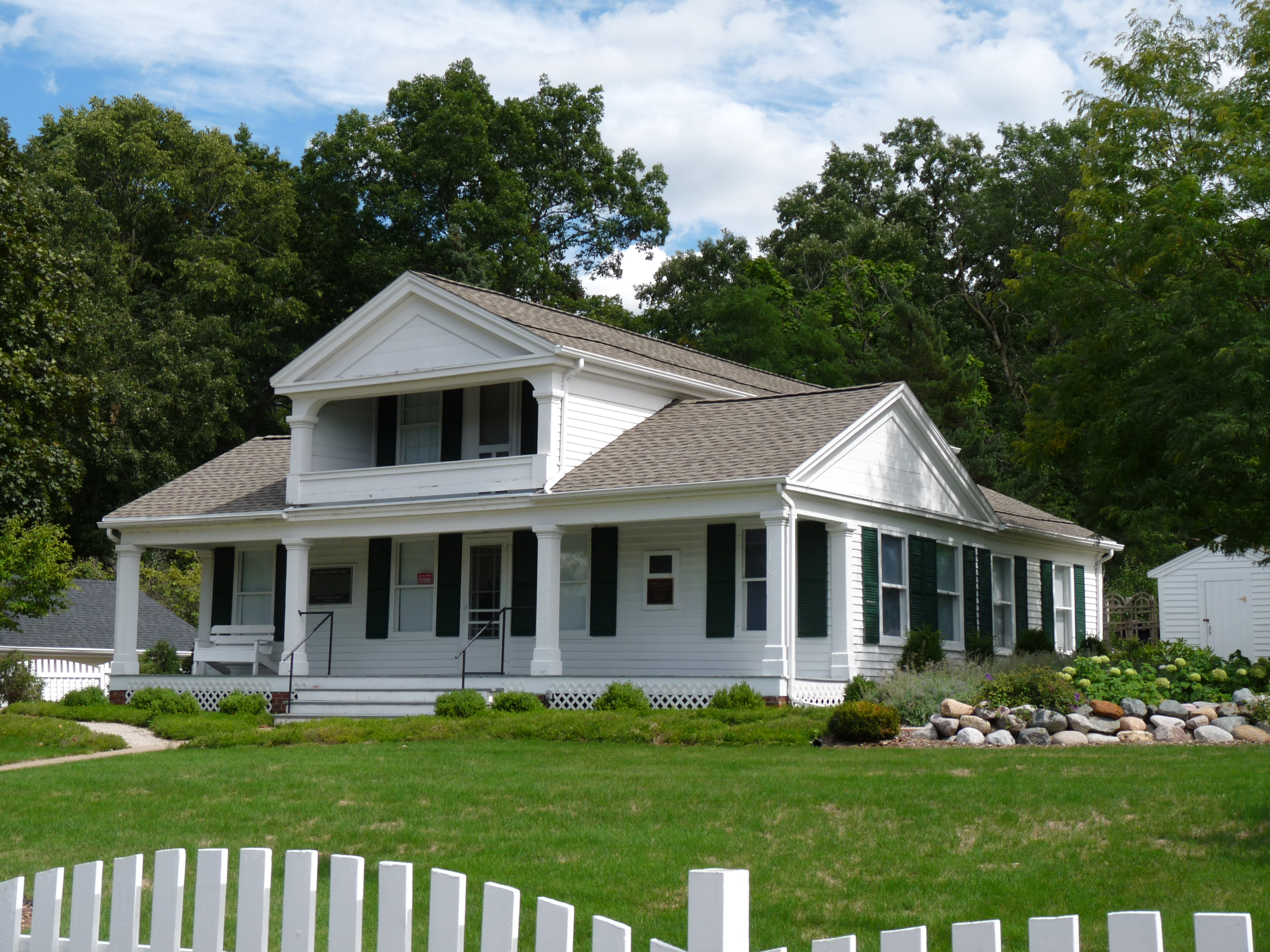
- Mueller-Wright House
- Location: Washington and Mueller Sts., Wrightstown, Wisconsin
- Coordinates: 44°19′35″N 88°09′43″W
- Area: 0.4 acres (0.16 ha)
- Built: 1872
- Architectural style: Greek Revival
- NRHP reference No.: 78000078
- Added to NRHP: March 29, 1978

The Mueller-Wright House is located in Wrightstown, Wisconsin.

== History ==
The house was constructed sometime during the 1840s. Currently, it serves as a museum and library. It was added to the National Register of Historic Places in 1978 and to the State Register of Historic Places in 1989.

It is regarded to be a good example of Greek Revival architecture, and to be significant for association with Hoel S. Wright and Carl G. Mueller, two men who greatly developed Wrightstown.
