= Marcellus Pedrick House =

Historic house in Wisconsin, United States

- U.S. National Register of Historic Places
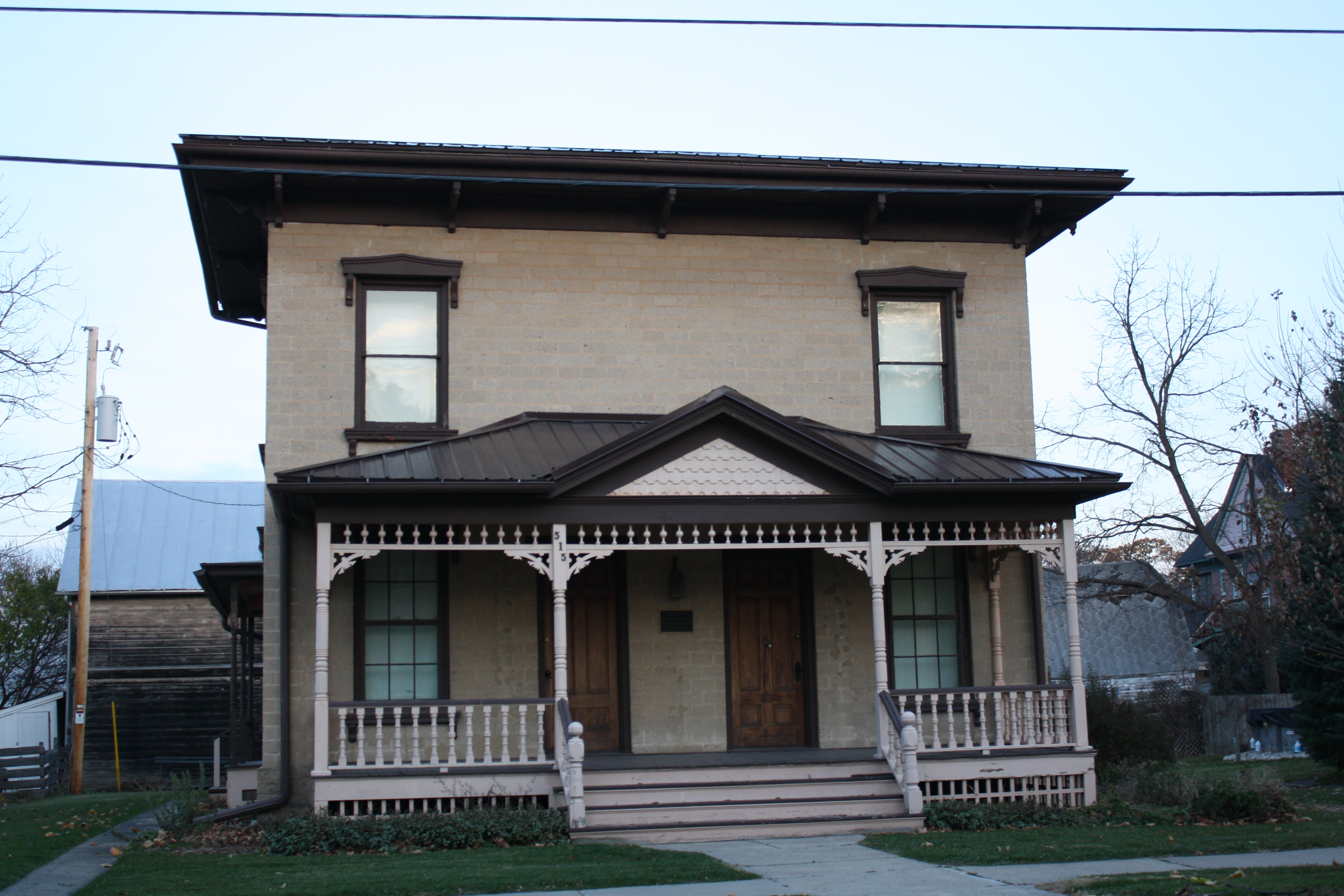
- Marcellus Pedrick House
- Location: 515 Ransom Ave. Ripon, Wisconsin
- Coordinates: 43.8411705°N 88.8397689°W
- Architectural style: Italianate
- NRHP reference No.: 76000061
- Added to NRHP: September 29, 1976

The Marcellus Pedrick House, also known as the Pedrick-Lawson House, is located in Ripon, Wisconsin, United States. It was added to the National Register of Historic Places in 1976.

The house is owned by the Ripon Historical Society and maintained as a historic house museum.

== History ==
The house was built by Marcellus Pedrick for himself and his wife in the 1850s. Pedrick had moved to Ripon from New York City in 1849. Later, the house was lived in by Hollis Atkins and his family from 1903 to 1918. In 1919, Louisa La Belle moved into the house. She remained there until her death in 1973, at which time she left the house to the Ripon Historical Society in her will.
