= Dr. Newman C. Rowley House =

Historic house in Wisconsin, United States

- U.S. National Register of Historic Places
- Dr. Newman C. Rowley House
- Location: 7410 Hubbard Ave., Middleton, Wisconsin
- Coordinates: 43°05′43″N 89°30′32″W
- Area: less than one acre
- Built: 1868
- Architectural style: Mid 19th Century Revival
- NRHP reference No.: 99000518
- Added to NRHP: April 29, 1999

The Dr. Newman C. Rowley House is a fine brick house built in 1868 in Middleton, Wisconsin. In 1999 it was listed on the National Register of Historic Places and is now a museum of the Middleton Area Historic Society.

== History ==
Middleton's first white settlers arrived in 1841, while Wisconsin was still a territory. The town of Middleton was established in 1848. In 1856, when the Milwaukee and Mississippi Railroad built its line through heading west, associates of the railroad platted the village of Middleton Station, which became an important shipping center for the surrounding farmers.

Newman Campbell Rowley was born in Vermont in 1815. He financed his own medical education by teaching and borrowing, and received his medical diploma in 1849. Around the same time he married Sarah H. Davis. In 1850 they moved to Wisconsin. He practiced medicine in early Verona for a bit, then Middleton Junction, then Verona again, but finally moved to Middleton Station in 1861 or '62. He was the first doctor in town, and he built a drugstore with medical offices above. His son Antinous completed his medical education at Rush Medical College in Chicago and joined N.C. in 1868, with the drugstore named "Rowley & Son."

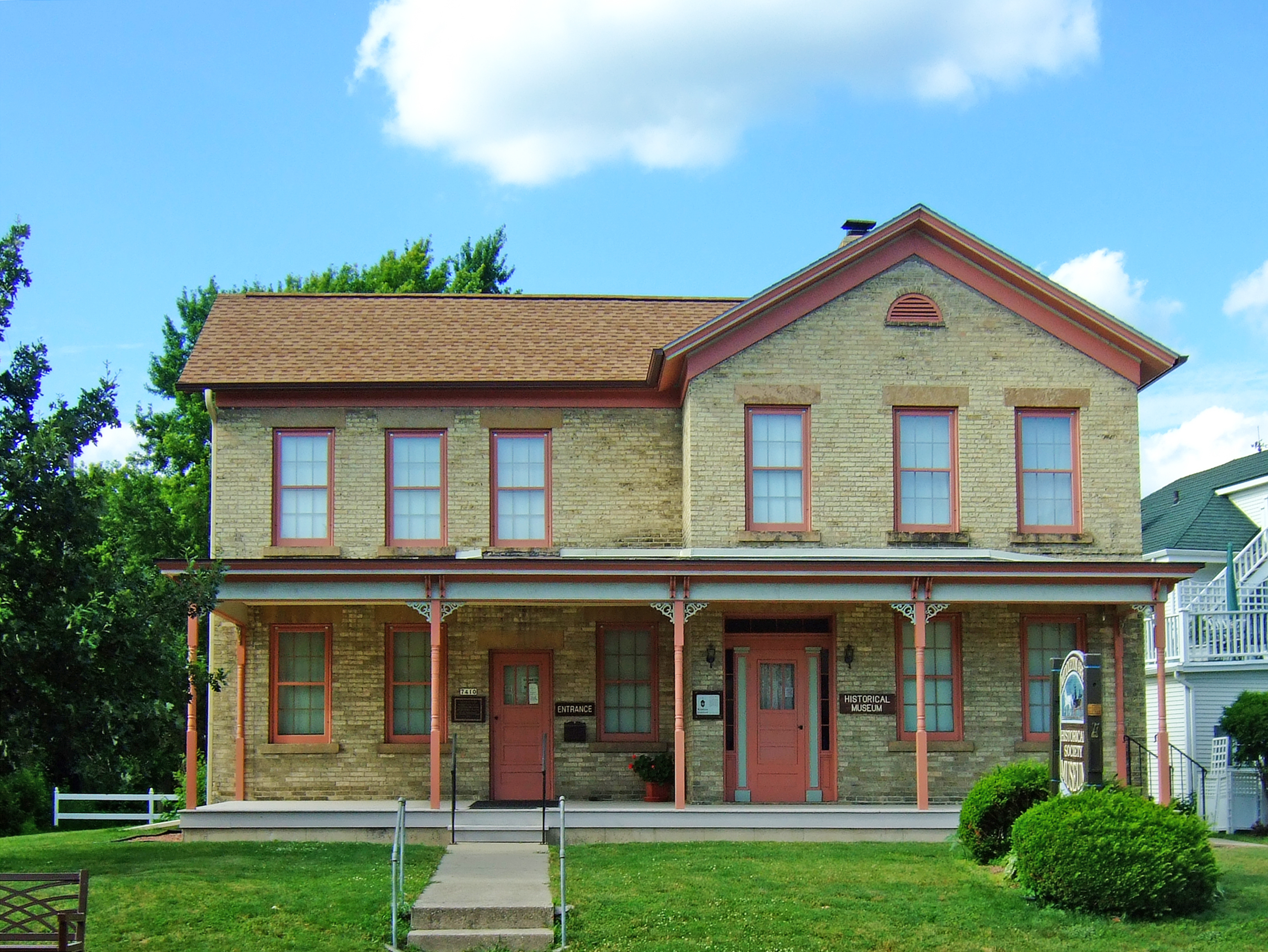
The house from the front

In 1868 Newman built the house which is the subject of this article, about a block from his drugstore, and a block from the important junction where Parmenter Street crossed the railway. It is a fairly simply styled two-story house with a gabled-ell footprint. The walls are cream brick made in Edgerton, sitting on a limestone foundation. The windows are six-over-six sash, with stone sills and lintels. The walls are topped by a frieze board, and then a rather low-pitched gable roof. A porch spans the whole front of the house, supported by turned posts decorated with brackets. The front door is framed in sidelights and transom. Inside are narrow wood floors, plaster walls, and some of the woodwork is painted to look like wood grain.

The two doctors Rowley established a "pest house" outside of town along Pheasant Branch Creek, (Note: Source says "Somewhere along Middleton Creek between Middleton and Pheasant Branch, hidden under brush and trees, are the remains of what was once the Pest House." However, there are no other records of a Middleton Creek; it was most likely Pheasant Branch Creek.) where people with smallpox could be cared for while under quarantine. The Rowleys also helped start the Presbyterian church in Middleton and then the Baptist church, helped found Masonic Lodge #180 in 1870, and N.C. was a charter member of the Odd Fellows Lodge.

Newman died in 1871. His son A.A. continued the practice, moving into his father's house with his wife and children. When A.A. died in 1902, his son Antinous Gilbert took over the practice. In 1909 A.G. built a new house at 7320 Rowley Avenue, but other relatives lived in N.C.'s house on Hubbard St. A.G. continued practice until 1955. When he retired, the three generations of Rowleys had provided medical care in western Dane County for 105 years.

Rowley descendants lived in the house until 1989. Then the Middleton Area Historical Society bought the house. They rebuilt the front porch, restored some parts of the house to be more historically authentic, and now use it as a house museum and their headquarters.
