= Old Plover Methodist Church =

Historic church in Wisconsin, United States

- U.S. National Register of Historic Places
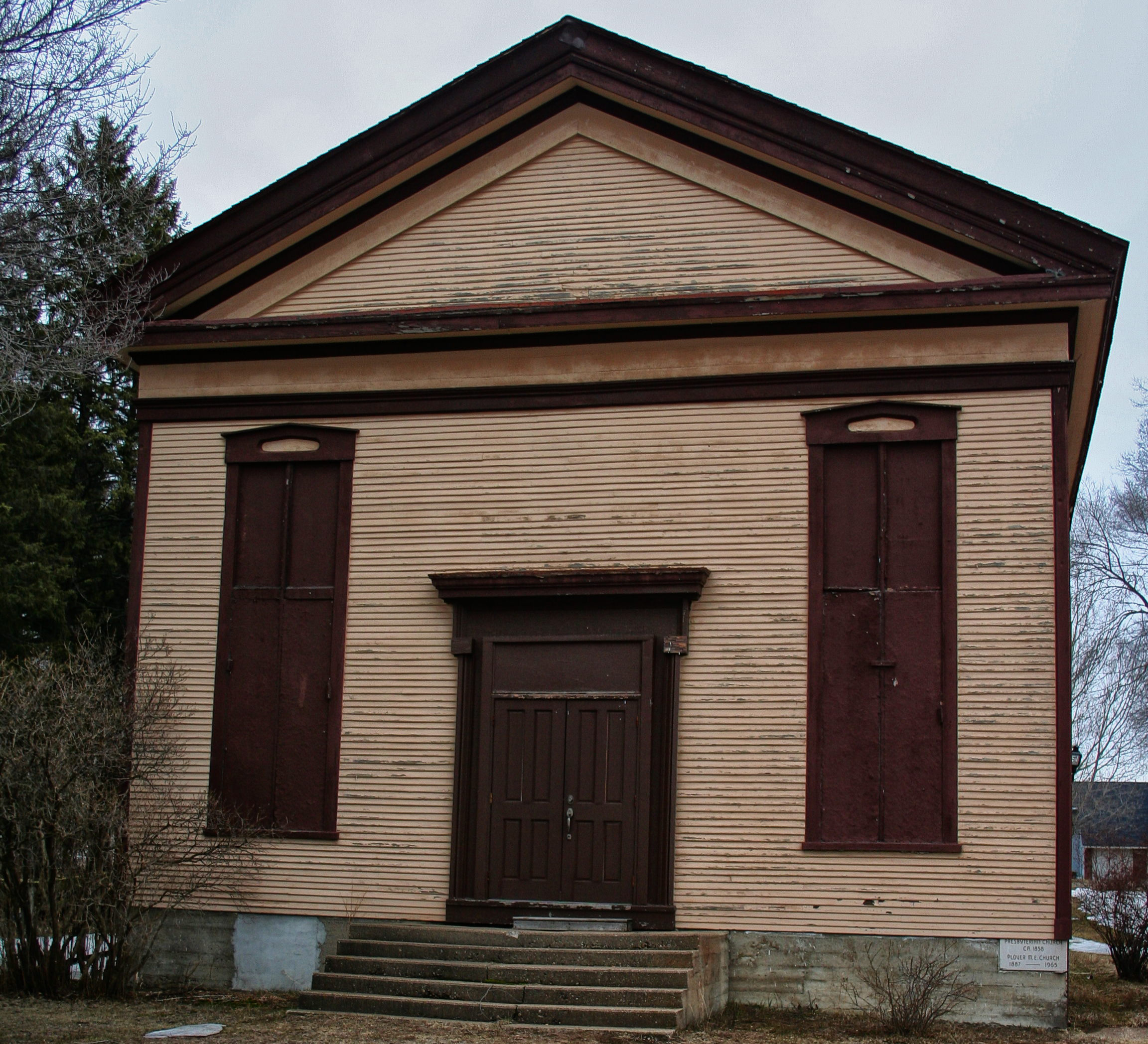
- Location: Madison Ave. Plover, Wisconsin
- Coordinates: 44.4569°N 89.54092°W
- NRHP reference No.: 80000393
- Added to NRHP: March 27, 1980

The Old Plover Methodist Church is located in Plover, Wisconsin. It was added to the National Register of Historic Places in 1980.

== History ==
The church was built around 1857 by a Presbyterian congregation in the Greek Revival style. In 1866, it was sold to a Methodist congregation who used it until 1963. The building is now the oldest remaining church building in Portage County and is a museum of the Portage County Historical Society.
