= Fairlawn Mansion =

42-bedroom Victorian House in Superior, Wisconsin

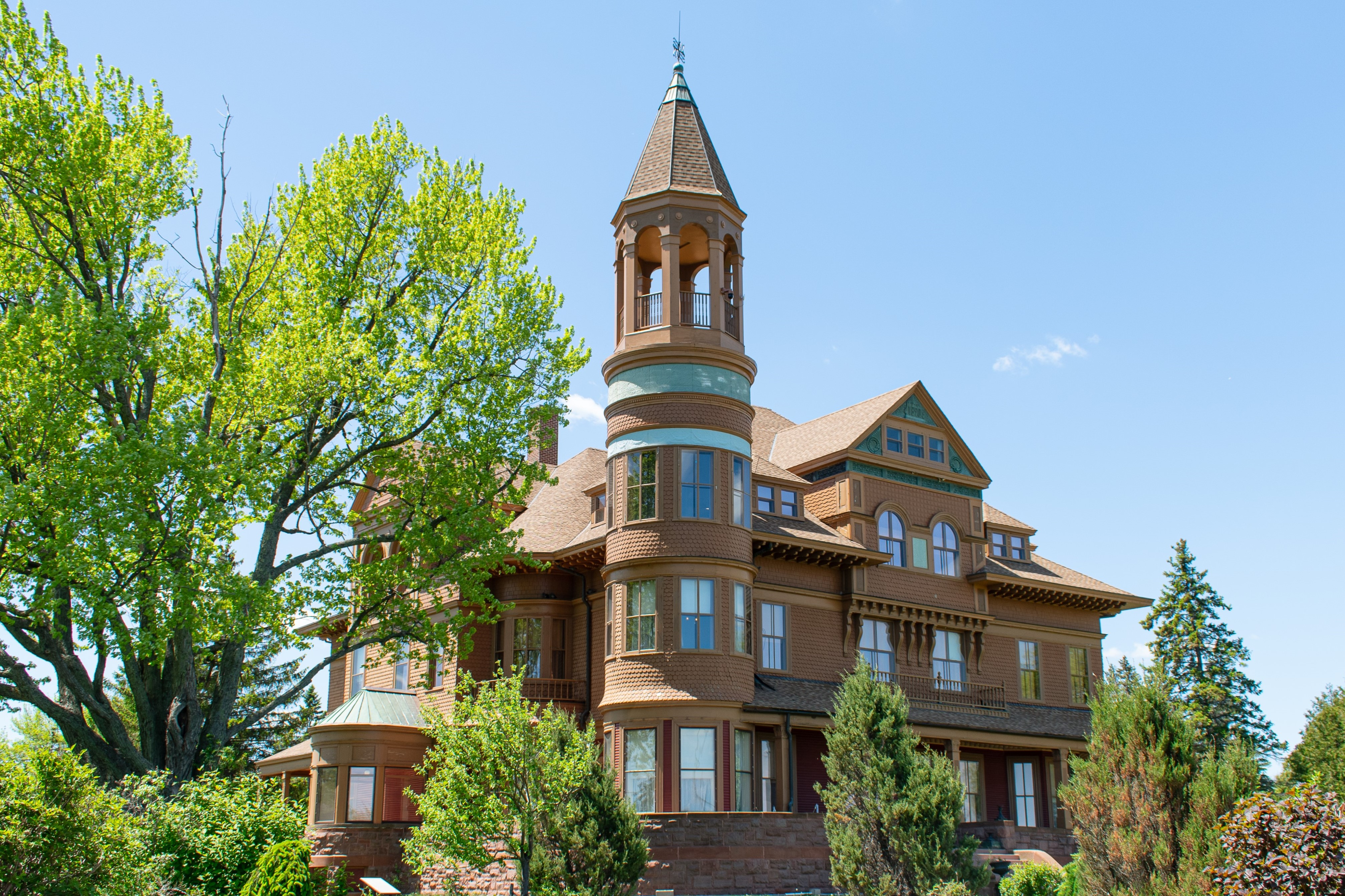
- Location: 906 E 2nd St #3245; Superior, Wisconsin
- Coordinates: 46°43′4″N 92°3′46″W
- Website: https://superiorpublicmuseums.org/fairlawn-mansion/

Fairlawn Mansion is a 4-story, 42 room Victorian House in Superior, Wisconsin. The mansion was built as a residence for former three-time mayor of Superior and lumber baron, Martin Pattison and his family. The residence, which was completed in 1891, cost over $150,000, the equivalent of $5 million now. It is said by Grace Pattinson, the matron of the home that with the additional furnishings, it cost $250,000 about $8 million today. Pattison and his family lived in the residence until 1918, after which, it became used as a Children's Home from 1920 to 1962. The building's floors were completely restored, and since the 1990s, the building has been used as a tourist attraction. Within the 42 rooms, the main floor consists of a library, a reception room, a parlor, music room, dining room and Martin's office. The main floor was restored in 1996 at the cost of about $1.6 million. It was restored to resemble a Victorian era home.
