= Schlegelmilch-McDaniel House =

Coordinates: 44.809373°N 91.496128°W

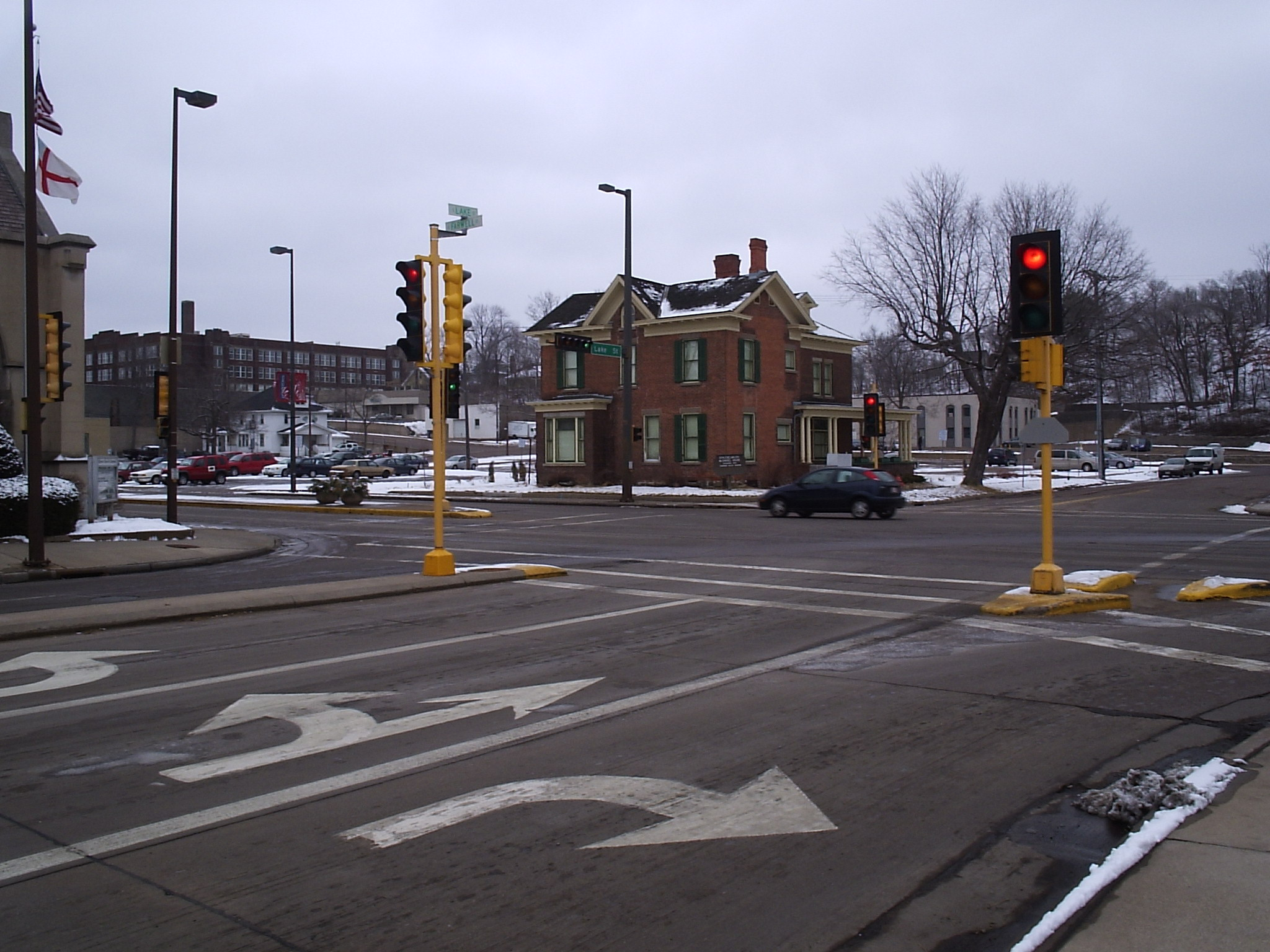
The Schlegelmilch-McDaniel House from diagonally-across Farwell and Lake Streets.

The Schlegelmilch-McDaniel House is a house-turned-museum in Eau Claire, Wisconsin. The house was built in 1871, one year before Eau Claire became a city. Today, the house, located at 517 S. Farwell St., directly across Farwell St. from the Christ Church Cathedral, is an exhibit of the Chippewa Valley Museum.
