= Brandon Village Hall and Library =

- U.S. National Register of Historic Places
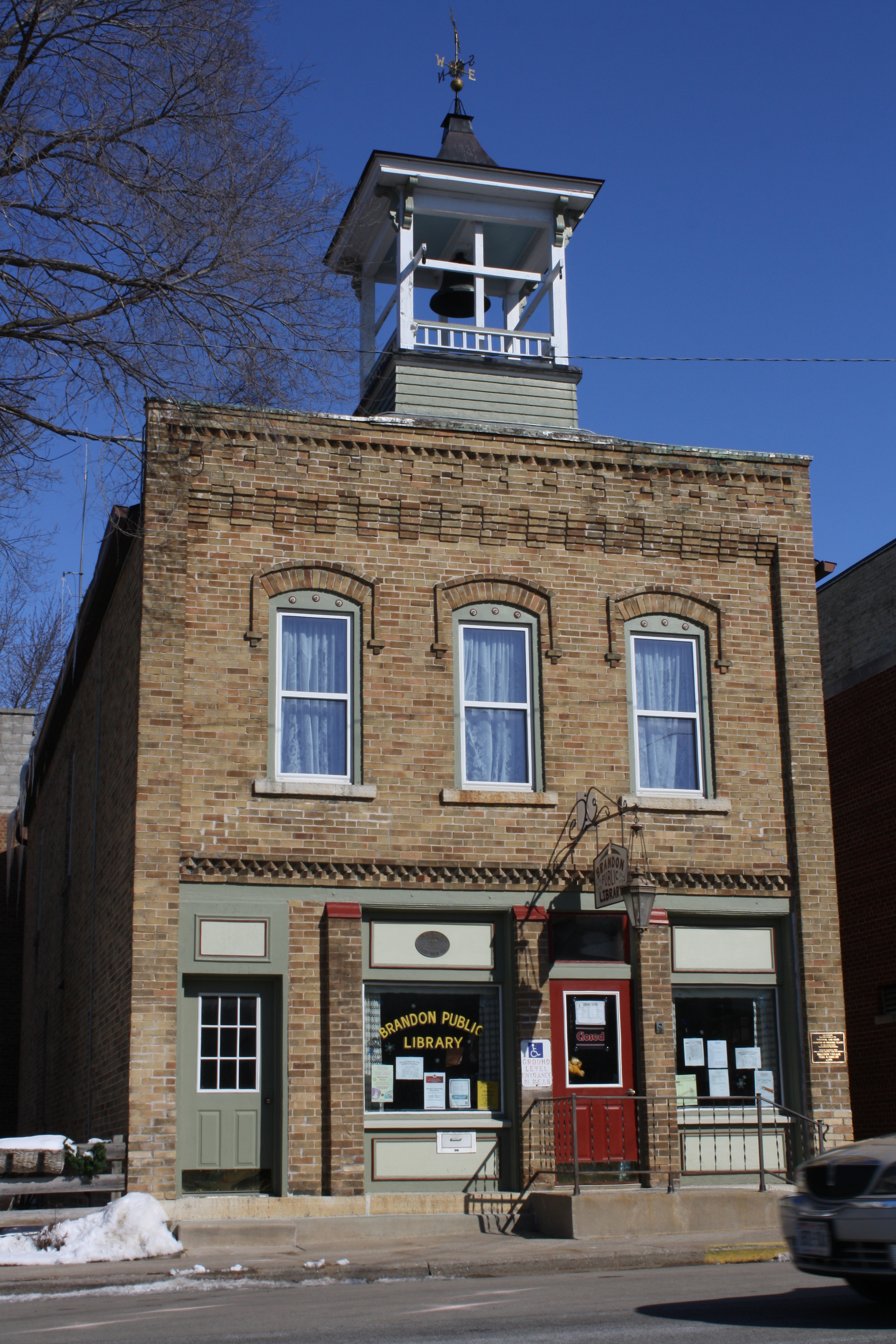
- Location: 117 E. Main St. Brandon, Wisconsin
- Coordinates: 43.73515°N 88.78225°W
- Built: 1894
- NRHP reference No.: 07001388
- Added to NRHP: January 9, 2008

The Brandon Village Hall and Library is located in Brandon, Wisconsin. It was added to the National Register of Historic Places in 2008.

== History ==
The building was originally constructed as retail building and cold storage plant. In 1897, it was purchased by the Village of Brandon. The village would transform the cold storage plant portions of the building to house meeting rooms and the fire department. Another portion of the building was still used for retail purposes until 1913, at which time the public library moved into the space. When the fire department moved to other quarters, that area became a garage. In 1973, the library expanded into the garage space. The meeting room areas later became the village hall. In 2001, the village hall portion became a museum for the Brandon Historical Society.
