= National Register of Historic Places listings in Ozaukee County, Wisconsin =

Location of Ozaukee County in Wisconsin

This is a list of the National Register of Historic Places listings in Ozaukee County, Wisconsin. It is intended to provide a comprehensive listing of entries in the National Register of Historic Places that are located in Ozaukee County, Wisconsin. The locations of National Register properties for which the latitude and longitude coordinates are included below may be seen in a map.

There are 42 properties and districts listed on the National Register in the county.

This National Park Service list is complete through NPS recent listings posted May 29, 2026.

== Current listings ==
	Name on the Register	Image	Date listed	Location	City or town	Description
1	Bigelow School	Bigelow School	July 27, 2000 (#00000851)	4228 W. Bonniwell Rd. 43°15′57″N 87°57′42″W	Mequon	Brick once-rural one-room school built in 1929, designed by William Redden in Classical Revival style. Served as a school until consolidation in the 1960s.
2	Harry W. Bolens House	Harry W. Bolens House	August 25, 1983 (#83003407)	842 W. Grand Ave. 43°23′14″N 87°53′14″W	Port Washington	2.5-story Queen Anne-style home built in 1900 for Bolens, newspaper-man, inventor, manufacturer (of printing presses, gas engines, two-cylinder automobile and garden tractors), Port Washington mayor and state senator.
3	Cedarburg Mill	Cedarburg Mill	May 8, 1974 (#74000115)	215 E. Columbia Ave. 43°17′48″N 87°59′10″W	Cedarburg	5-story gristmill with walls of local, high-quality limestone, built in 1855 by Frederick Hilgen and William Schroeder with monitor roofs and Greek Revival-style cornice returns.
4	Cedarburg Woolen Co. Worsted Mill	Cedarburg Woolen Co. Worsted Mill	June 30, 1983 (#83003408)	1350 14th Ave. 43°19′03″N 87°56′57″W	Grafton	Mill that made worsted yarn, combing, spinning, and dyeing wool from 1880 to 1980. The original 1880 part is 3 stories with limestone walls and a 4-story tower.
5	Jonathan Clark House	Jonathan Clark House	June 2, 1982 (#82000692)	13615 N. Cedarburg Rd. 43°15′57″N 87°59′23″W	Mequon	1.5-story house with fieldstone walls and limestone front, built in simple Greek Revival style for Vermonter Clark in 1848.
6	Columbia Historic District	Columbia Historic District	January 22, 1992 (#91001980)	Roughly bounded by Cedar Cr., Highland Dr. and Bridge Rd. 43°17′59″N 87°58′57″W	Cedarburg	Residential neighborhood NE of the downtown, including the 1860 limestone tinsmith shop/Gleitzmann Cooperage, the 1865 Greek Revival limestone Gleitzmann house, the 1869 Italianate Hilgen house, the 1889 Queen Anne Boerner house, the 1891 Gothic Revival Trinity Lutheran Church, the 1908 Craftsman Hilgen house, the 1925 Schaefer bungalow, and the 1931 Tudor Revival Scheunemann house.
7	Concordia Mill	Concordia Mill	April 26, 1974 (#74000116)	252 Green Bay Rd. 43°17′05″N 87°58′13″W	Cedarburg	4-story gristmill with walls of local limestone and a gambrel roof, built on Cedar Creek by Edward Janssen in 1853.
8	Covered Bridge	Covered Bridge	March 14, 1973 (#73000092)	1 Mi. N of Five Corners over Cedar Creek; 43°20′16″N 88°00′16″W	Cedarburg	180-foot bridge over Cedar Creek, built with a latticed pine truss frame covered with board and batten. The last remaining original covered bridge in Wisconsin. Built 1876, retired 1962.
9	Isham Day House	Isham Day House	December 28, 2000 (#00001558)	11312 N. Cedarburg Rd. 43°13′25″N 87°59′00″W	Mequon	One of the oldest known buildings in Mequon, the 1.5 story cottage was built by Yankee Isham Day in 1839, before the German influx. The construction is unusual, with walls framed in vertical sawn timbers joined by mortise and tenon and infilled with brick.
10	Edward Dodge House	Edward Dodge House	July 24, 1975 (#75000074)	126 E. Grand Ave. 43°23′16″N 87°52′10″W	Port Washington	1.5-story Greek Revival-styled home built in 1848 and faced rather whimsically with small cobblestones from the Lake Michigan beach, arranged in colored bands. Also known as Pebble House.
11	Grafton Flour Mill	Grafton Flour Mill	June 30, 1983 (#83003409)	1300 14th Ave. 43°19′06″N 87°56′58″W	Grafton	Mill on the Milwaukee River, originally built by Yankee farmers in 1846 as a flour mill. Produced "White Lily" flour in the 1880s. Bought by Badger Worsted Mills during the Depression.
12	Green Bay Road Historic District	Green Bay Road Historic District	November 26, 2004 (#04001278)	149-195 Green Bay Rd. 43°13′58″N 87°58′56″W	Thiensville	Cluster of 11 parcels on the west side of Green Bay Road, which the government built in the 1830s to connect Milwaukee with Fort Howard. Structures include the 1884 Queen Anne-styled Hoeft house, the 1889 Gierach Blacksmith/Grocery Shop, the 1909 Queen Anne Staudy house, and the 1929 Hadler Harness and Printing Shop.
13	Hamilton Historic District	Hamilton Historic District	July 1, 1976 (#76000070)	Hamilton and Green Bay Rds. 43°17′00″N 87°58′17″W	Cedarburg	The hamlet of Hamilton was once the bustling first stage stop from Milwaukee on the Green Bay Road, but development largely paused when the railroad bypassed it. Buildings include the 1847 Ranken-Schleifer house, the 1854 Greek Revival Janssen house, the ruins of the 1860 Lindner store, the 1861 Hentschel General Store, and the 1867 Italianate Turn Halle, many of which are stone.
14	Hilgen and Wittenberg Woolen Mill	Hilgen and Wittenberg Woolen Mill	December 22, 1978 (#78000124)	N70 W6340 Bridge Rd. 43°18′05″N 87°59′18″W	Cedarburg	Well-preserved mill complex on Cedar Creek, including the 1865 Greek Revival-styled mill office and store, the main mill building, the 1893 dye house, and the 1896 powerhouses. Produced yarns, flannels, blankets and mackinaws to substitute for cotton products after the Civil War, operating until 1968.
15	Hoffman House Hotel	Hoffman House Hotel	March 1, 1984 (#84003773)	200 W. Grand Ave. 43°23′16″N 87°52′22″W	Port Washington	3-story Queen Anne-styled hotel with corner oriel. Completed in 1901, it was one of the city's four first-class hotels during Port's boom period.
16	Island City (schooner) Shipwreck		November 10, 2011 (#11000810)	9 miles southeast of Port Washington in Lake Michigan; 43°14′18″N 87°50′43″W	Mequon vicinity	81-foot lakeshoring schooner built by Peter Perry on Harsens Island, Michigan in 1859. Sank in a storm in April 1894, on her way from Ludington to Milwaukee, with two men lost.
17	J.M. Allmendinger (Steambarge) Shipwreck	J.M. Allmendinger (Steambarge) Shipwreck	October 11, 2018 (#100003012)	2.5 mi. SSE of Concordia U. in Lake Michigan	Mequon	104 foot wood-hulled steam-screw barge built in 1883 by Albert Burgoyne at Benton Harbor. Hauled mostly lumber until November of 1895, when she ran aground during a gale and broke up.
18	William F. Jahn Farmstead	William F. Jahn Farmstead	August 10, 2000 (#00000978)	12112-12116 N. Wauwatosa Rd. 43°14′18″N 88°00′11″W	Mequon	Now-domesticated farm, including 1855 Greek Revival-styled farmhouse, an 1855 summer kitchen, an 1855 basement barn, and an 1861-1880 pig barn, now remodeled as a home. Jahn was an immigrant from Saxony who farmed, surveyed, and served in various local public offices.
19	Kendall Cabinet Shop	Kendall Cabinet Shop	November 29, 2016 (#14000887)	W4128 Mill St. 43°28′17″N 87°59′31″W	Waubeka	2-story clapboard industrial building built in 1863. The building was turned into a factory to manufacture pearl buttons from the shells of freshwater mussels in 1892 and operated into the first decade of the 20th century. At the button factory was Waubeka's largest employer.
20	Main Street Historic District	Main Street Historic District	November 26, 2004 (#04001279)	101 N. Main St., 105-130 S. Main St., 101 Green Bay Rd. & 107 W. Buntrock Ave. 43°13′49″N 87°59′02″W	Thiensville	Ten contributing buildings, including the 1895 Queen Anne-styled Commercial House Hotel, the 1898 Queen Anne Maas-Bublitz house, the 1914 Village Hall and Fire Department with its hose-drying tower, the 1915 American Foursquare Reimer house, the 1920 Craftsman-influenced Bublitz Grocery, and the 1927 20th Century Commercial-styled Thiensville Recreation Parlor.
21	Mequon Town Hall and Fire Station Complex	Mequon Town Hall and Fire Station Complex	July 18, 2000 (#00000779)	11333 N. Cedarburg Rd. 43°13′25″N 87°59′04″W	Mequon	1937 Art Deco building complex designed by Satre and Senescall of Sheboygan, including pool house and swimming pool built with WPA help.
22	Milwaukee Falls Lime Company	Milwaukee Falls Lime Company	January 27, 2012 (#11001071)	2020 Green Bay Rd; 43°18′17″N 87°57′24″W	Grafton	Remnants of lime production plant from the 1890s, including limestone quarry, kilns, and dam.
23	NIAGARA (steamer)	NIAGARA (steamer)	December 16, 1996 (#96001456)	one mile off shore 43°29′19″N 87°46′30″W	Belgium	The wreck of the Niagara, a 225-foot side-wheeled steamboat built in 1846 in Buffalo. Caught fire and sank in 1856, taking the lives of 60 of its 300 passengers.
24	Edwin J. Nieman Sr. House	Edwin J. Nieman Sr. House	April 12, 1996 (#96000418)	13030 N. Cedarburg Rd. 43°15′19″N 87°59′25″W	Mequon	Elaborate Tudor Revival-styled mansion designed by Herman Bruns of Milwaukee and built in 1928 in a unit of the Fromm Bros.-Nieman fox farm - at that time the nation's largest breeder of silver foxes.
25	NORTHERNER Shipwreck (Schooner)	NORTHERNER Shipwreck (Schooner)	December 10, 2010 (#10001005)	5 miles southeast of Port Washington Harbor in Lake Michigan; 43°18′53″N 87°49′27″W	Grafton	81-foot lakeshoring schooner, built in 1850 by John Oades of Clayton, NY. In 1868 she was damaged while loading wood, started leaking badly, and sank off Port Ulao while being towed to Milwaukee for repair.
26	O'Brien-Peuschel Farmstead	O'Brien-Peuschel Farmstead	October 24, 2000 (#00001236)	12510 N. Wauwatosa Rd. 43°14′43″N 88°00′10″W	Mequon	John O'Brien started the farm in 1846, building the Greek Revival-styled fieldstone farmhouse and the haybarn and granary around 1850. In 1855 German immigrants John and Henriette Pueschel bought the farm and their family farmed it for over 100 years, adding the 1874 barn, the 1900 corn crib, the 1900 well house, the 1900 outhouse and a 1910 silo.
27	Old Ozaukee County Courthouse	Old Ozaukee County Courthouse	December 12, 1976 (#76000071)	109 W. Main St. 43°23′18″N 87°52′16″W	Port Washington	Richardsonian Romanesque-styled courthouse with 4-story tower, clad in gray-blue Cedarburg limestone, designed by Frederick Graf and built in 1902.
28	Payne Hotel	Payne Hotel	March 14, 1991 (#91000220)	310 E. Green Bay Ave. 43°22′54″N 87°56′18″W	Saukville	1848 Greek Revival-styled stagecoach inn with a ballroom on the third floor, built by English immigrant and Saukville founder William Payne where the Dekorra Military Road (now roughly Highway 33) met the Green Bay Road.
29	Port Washington Downtown Historic District	Port Washington Downtown Historic District	September 8, 2000 (#00001070)	Roughly along N. Franklin St., from E Jackson St. to E Grand Ave. 43°23′22″N 87°52′07″W	Port Washington	The old commercial downtown, including the 1855 Italianate-styled Wisconsin House Hotel, the 1857 Federal Style Nosen building, the 1891 Queen Anne Bink saloon, the 1907 Richardsonian Romanesque Zimmerman saloon, the 1909 Neoclassical First National Bank, the 1930 Art Deco Schumacher Monument Co., the 1942 Art Moderne Schanen building, and the 1954 Colonial Revival Smith Bros. seafood restaurant.
30	Port Washington Fire Engine House	Port Washington Fire Engine House	November 5, 2009 (#09000894)	102 East Pier St. 43°23′24″N 87°52′15″W	Port Washington	Mediterranean Revival-styled fire station with red tile roof and hose drying tower. Designed by John Topzant and built in 1929.
31	Port Washington Light Station	Port Washington Light Station	September 29, 1999 (#99001222)	311 E. Johnson St. 43°23′28″N 87°52′03″W	Port Washington	Lighthouse built in 1860, where the light-keeper lived with his family. In 1934 it was remodeled into two apartments for use by the Light Service and later the Coast Guard.
32	Port Washington North Breakwater Light	Port Washington North Breakwater Light	December 3, 2018 (#100003160)	550 E Jackson St. 43°23′07″N 87°51′35″W	Port Washington	Art moderne-styled lighthouse built in 1935 with help from the WPA, as part of expanding the harbor for the Milwaukee Electric Railway & Light Co. power plant.
33	John Reichert Farmhouse	John Reichert Farmhouse	July 1, 1982 (#82000693)	14053 N. Wauwatosa Rd. 43°16′25″N 88°00′15″W	Mequon	Stick style house built around 1885, with unusual trompe-l'œil bay windows.
34	St. Mary's Roman Catholic Church	St. Mary's Roman Catholic Church	December 12, 1977 (#77000042)	430 N. Johnson St. 43°23′30″N 87°52′10″W	Port Washington	Gothic Revival-styled Catholic church designed by Henry Messmer and built in 1882, largely from limestone quarried 3 miles to the north.
35	St. Peter Shipwreck (Schooner)		December 19, 2024 (#100011163)	Address Restricted	Port Washington vicinity	90-foot wood-hulled 2-masted schooner built in 1868 by Peter Perry at New Baltimore, Michigan. Named for the builder and the patron saint of shipbuilders, she hauled staves, coal, lumber, salt, wheat, etc. around the Great Lakes, as far east as Oswego. On May 5, 1874 she left Chicago for Buffalo with a load of wheat (possibly an overload), hit stormy weather, was abandoned, and sank 35 miles northeast of Milwaukee under 450 feet of water.
36	SENATOR (steam screw) Shipwreck	SENATOR (steam screw) Shipwreck	April 12, 2016 (#15000738)	Address Restricted	Port Washington vicinity	402-foot steam screw built in 1896 by the Detroit Dry Dock Company. In October 1929, heading from Milwaukee to Detroit carrying 241 (or 268?) Nash autos, she collided with the Marquette in a heavy fog and sank quickly, with 7 men lost.
37	Stony Hill School	Stony Hill School	October 8, 1976 (#76000072)	NE of Waubeka on SR 1; 43°28′46″N 87°58′48″W	Waubeka	Location of the earliest formal observance of Flag Day, by schoolteacher Bernard Cigrand, in 1885.
38	TENNIE AND LAURA (Shipwreck)	TENNIE AND LAURA (Shipwreck)	April 11, 2008 (#08000288)	9 miles off shore from Port Washington; 43°15′39″N 87°43′38″W	Port Washington	73-foot scow-schooner built by Gunder Jorgenson in Manitowoc in 1876. In 1903, running from Muskegon to Milwaukee under Captain John Sather with a load of lumber, she sank in a storm ten miles from her destination, with one crewman lost.
39	Frank Vocke Octagonal Barn	Frank Vocke Octagonal Barn	October 24, 2016 (#16000740)	1901 W. Pioneer Rd. 43°16′48″N 87°56′03″W	Mequon	Octagonal barn with fieldstone foundation, wood sides, and small octagonal cupola, built by Ernst Clausing in 1891.
40	Jacob Voigt House	Jacob Voigt House	September 22, 2000 (#00001164)	11550 N. Wauwatosa Rd. 43°13′44″N 88°00′28″W	Mequon	Farmstead of German immigrants, with an 1855 house with walls of finely laid fieldstone and a gambrel-roofed barn built in 1880.
41	Washington Avenue Historic District	Washington Avenue Historic District	January 17, 1986 (#86000218)	Roughly bounded by Elm St., Cedar Creek, Hamilton Rd., and Washington Ave. 43°18′01″N 87°59′16″W	Cedarburg	Much of old downtown Cedarburg, including the 1847 Cedarburg Brewery Complex, the 1853 Greek Revival Schroeder house, the 1853 Stagecoach Inn, the 1870 Romanesque Revival St. Francis Borgia Catholic Church, the 1870 Italianate Hoehn Furniture Store, the 1873 Groth's Hardware, the 1882 Gothic Revival Immanuel Evangelical Lutheran Church, the 1885 Queen Anne-styled Weisler Hotel, the 1886 Washington House Inn, the 1894 Lincoln Public School, and the 1926 pagoda-styled Wadham's Filling Station.
42	Wayside House	Wayside House	March 17, 1982 (#82000694)	W61 N439 Washington Ave. 43°17′31″N 87°59′11″W	Cedarburg	Brick and stone Victorian home, built starting in 1846 by German immigrant Frederick Hilgen, the "father of Cedarburg."

== See also ==
- List of National Historic Landmarks in Wisconsin
- National Register of Historic Places listings in Wisconsin
- Listings in neighboring counties: Milwaukee, Sheboygan, Washington, Waukesha
