= Jacob Voigt =

Jacob Voigt may refer to

- Jaap Voigt (born 1941), Dutch field hockey player
- Jacob Voigt House in Mequon, Wisconsin, United States.
