= Kettle Moraine =

Large moraine in Wisconsin

Coordinates: 43°35′N 88°11′W

- Moraine
- Interactive map of Kettle Moraine
- Location: Wisconsin, United States

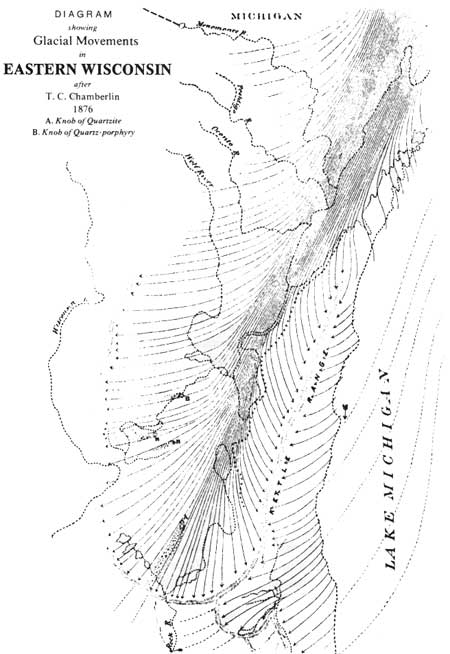
A map showing the area, labeled here as "Kettle Range"

Kettle Moraine is a large moraine in the state of Wisconsin, United States. It stretches from Walworth County in the south to Kewaunee County in the north. It has also been referred to as the Kettle Range and, in geological texts, as the Kettle Interlobate Moraine.

== Background ==
The moraine was created when the Green Bay Lobe of the Laurentide Ice Sheet, on the west, collided with the Lake Michigan Lobe of that glacier, on the east, depositing sediment. The western lobe formed Green Bay, Lake Winnebago and the Horicon Marsh. The major part of the Kettle Moraine area is considered interlobate moraine, though other types of moraine features, and other glacial features are common.

The moraine formed in an interlobate zone between the lobes during deglaciation, where sediment-laden meltwater flowed through ice-walled channels and cavities on or within stagnant ice. As the supporting ice melted, these ice-walled channel and cavity deposits collapsed, producing a complex assemblage of morainic ridges, kames, and kettles rather than a single end-moraine formed by direct ice-lobe collision.

This process left depressions ranging from small ponds to large lakes and enclosed valleys. Water-filled kettles range in depth from 3 to 200 ft (0.9 to 60 m). The topography of this area is widely varied between the lakes and kettles and the hills of glacial deposits, which can rise up to 300 ft (90 m) from the lakes. The largest include Holy Hill, Pulford Peak and Lapham Peak. Elkhart Lake, Geneva Lake, and Little Cedar Lake are among the larger kettles now filled by lakes. Kames are also found in the Kettle Moraine area, and are mounds of compressed glacial till.

Parts of the area have been protected in the Kettle Moraine State Forest.

== Recreation ==
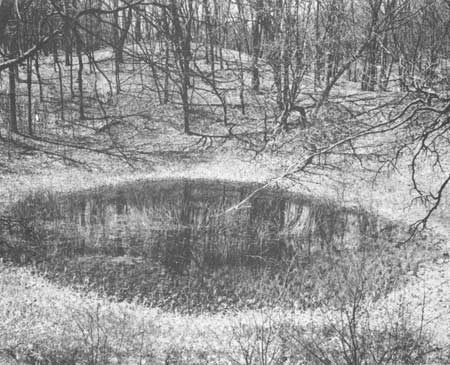
A small kettle in the area

Outdoor recreation opportunities include hiking, biking, cross-country skiing, snowshoeing, horseback riding, and snowmobiling. Fourteen trailheads are dispersed throughout the Northern Unit of the Kettle Moraine State Forest and 17 in the Southern Unit. Many Illinoisans tourists come during the summer to Kettle Moraine.

== Whitewater Lake & Rice Lake ==
There are some ports in Whitewater Lake and Rice Lake. These include The Boat House Whitewater Marina, Whitewater Lake Kayak Launch, Rice Lake Boat Launch, and Whitewater Lake Boat Launch. The shores of both lakes are muddy and sandy. The lakes are icy in the winter, allowing ATVs and other vehicles to be driven on the lakes; however, use caution when attempting to ride on the lakes.
