= Cedarburg (town), Wisconsin =

Town in Ozaukee County, Wisconsin

Town of Cedarburg, Wisconsin
- Town
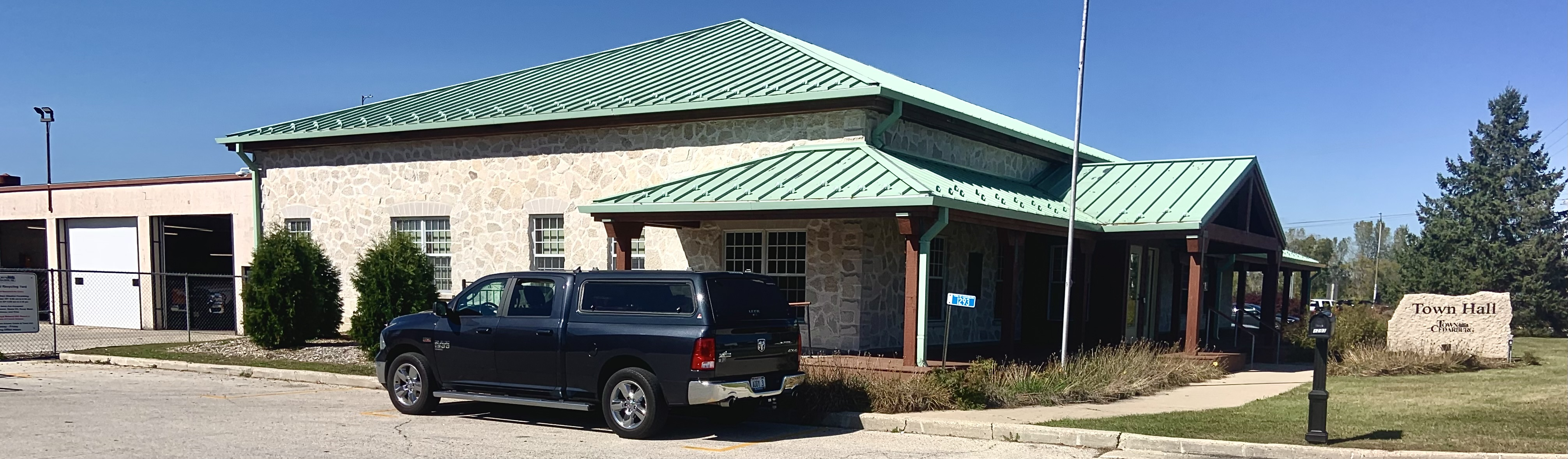
- Town hall

- Flag

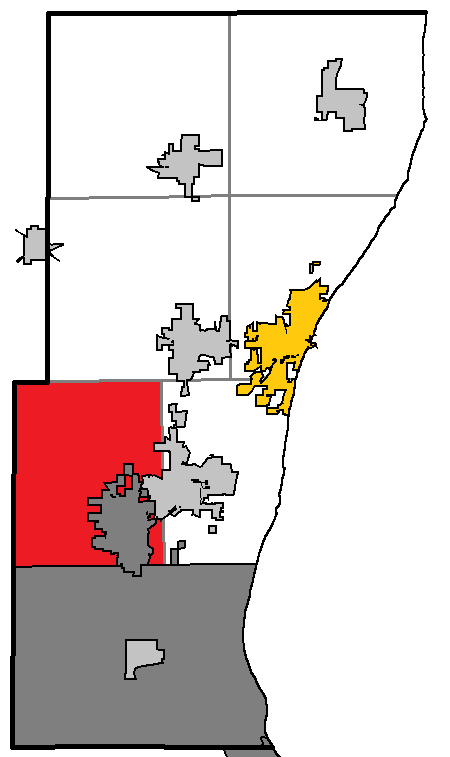
- Location of Cedarburg (town), within Ozaukee County
- Coordinates: 43°19′8″N 88°0′15″W
- Country: United States
- State: Wisconsin
- County: Ozaukee
- Settled: 1840s
- Incorporated: March 2, 1849; 177 years ago

Government
  - Town Chairman: David Salvaggio
  - Administrator: Eric Ryer
  - Clerk: Sara Jacoby
  - Treasurer: Katie LeBlanc
  - Town board: Supervisors: Wayne Pipkorn; Russ Lauer; Larry Lechner; Thomas Esser

Area
  - Total: 25.8 sq mi (66.9 km^{2})
  - Land: 25.6 sq mi (66.3 km^{2})
  - Water: 0.23 sq mi (0.6 km^{2})
- Elevation: 890 ft (270 m)

Population (2020)
  - Total: 6,162
  - Density: 241/sq mi (92.9/km^{2})
- Time zone: UTC-6 (Central (CST))
  - Summer (DST): UTC-5 (CDT)
- Area code: 262
- FIPS code: 55-13400
- GNIS feature ID: 1582937
- Website: www.townofcedarburgwi.gov

Cedarburg is a town in Ozaukee County, Wisconsin, United States, and is in the Milwaukee metropolitan area. The town was created in 1849 and at the time of the 2020 census had a population of 6,162.

German and Irish immigrants first settled in Cedarburg in the 1840s. Their centers of settlement became the unincorporated communities of Decker Corner, Hamilton, and Horns Corners, as well as the City of Cedarburg, which is located partially within the town.

The town contains three sites listed on the National Register of Historic Places: the Cedarburg covered bridge, the Concordia Mill, and the Hamilton Historic District. The bridge is the last historic covered bridge in the state and is featured on the town logo.

== History ==
The earliest evidence of humans in the Cedarburg area is the Hilgen Spring Mound Site, located in the eastern part of the city of Cedarburg, near Cedar Creek. The site consists of three conical burial mounds constructed by early Woodland period Mound Builders. In 1968, archaeologists from the Milwaukee Public Museum found human burials and artifacts, including stone altars, arrowheads, and pottery shards, during an excavation of one of the mounds. Radiocarbon samples from the excavation date the mounds' construction to approximately 480 BCE, making it one of the oldest mound groups in the state.

In the early 19th century, the land was inhabited by Native Americans, including the Potawatomi and Sauk tribes. The Potawatomi surrendered the land the United States Federal Government in 1833 through the 1833 Treaty of Chicago, which (after being ratified in 1835) required them to leave Wisconsin by 1838. While many Native people moved west of the Mississippi River to Kansas, some chose to remain, and were referred to as "strolling Potawatomi" in contemporary documents because many of them were migrants who subsisted by squatting on their ancestral lands, which were now owned by white settlers. Eventually the Potawatomi who evaded forced removal gathered in northern Wisconsin, where they formed the Forest County Potawatomi Community.

The first white settlement in the Cedarburg area was a community called "New Dublin," which later became Hamilton. The first resident was Joseph Gardenier, who built a log shanty on Cedar Creek as his headquarters for surveying for the construction of the Green Bay Road. In 1848, Hamilton became the first stop on the stagecoach route between Milwaukee and Green Bay.

Most of Cedarburg's early settlers were German immigrants. Ludwig Wilhelm Groth is usually credited with being the first settler of Cedarburg. He purchased land from the government on October 22, 1842, and began platting the banks of Cedar Creek. The Wisconsin state legislature created the Town of Cedarburg on March 2, 1849.

The first train line, which eventually became part of the Chicago, Milwaukee & St. Paul Railway, began running through Cedarburg in 1870. Cedarburg continued to grow and prosper due to its rail connections, while the surrounding communities of Hamilton, Decker Corner and Horns Corners remained more characteristically rural. The City of Cedarburg incorporated from some of the town's land in 1885.

The Excelsior Mill was built on Cedar Creek in the town in 1871 for $21,000. The mill produced both flour and lumber. In 1885, a large fire gutted the stone mill and destroyed the wooden outbuildings, causing the business to close. In 1890, John Weber, who owned the Columbia Mill upstream in the City of Cedarburg, bought the property and retooled the mill as a wire and nail factory.

Cedarburg grew rapidly during the post-war suburbanization and economic prosperity, and the City of Cedarburg began to annex land from the town for residential subdivisions.

== Geography ==
Cedar Creek

According to the United States Census Bureau, the Town of Cedarburg has a total area of 25.8 square miles (66.9 km^{2}), of which 25.6 square miles (66.3 km^{2}) of it is land and 0.2 square miles (0.6 km^{2}) (0.93%) is water.

The City of Cedarburg is mostly located in what was formerly the town's southeastern quadrant. The town is also bordered by the Town of Saukville and the Town of Trenton to the north, the Village of Grafton and the Town of Grafton to the east, the City of Mequon to the south, and the Town of Jackson to the west.

The unincorporated communities of Decker Corner, Hamilton, and Horns Corners are also located in the town.

The town is located in the Southeastern Wisconsin glacial till plains that were created by the Wisconsin glaciation during the most recent ice age. The soil in area is a mixture of well-draining material, loess, and loam, which all overlie a layer of glacial till. The town has some Silurian limestone deposits, including land around the City of Cedarburg. The early settlers utilized the area's limestone as a building material, and some mid-19th-century limestone structures still stand today.

Cedar Creek runs through the town from the Town of Jackson. It joins the Milwaukee River downstream in Grafton. The creek's lower reaches in the City of Cedarburg have high levels of PCB contamination, and in 1993, the Wisconsin Department of Natural Resources believed that Cedar Creek had the highest PCB contamination level in the state. Despite cleanup efforts, the Wisconsin DNR advises against eating any fish caught in the creek downstream from the Bridge Road dam. Mole Creek, a tributary of the Milwaukee River, flows through the Town of Cedarburg's Pleasant Valley Nature Park.

Before white settlers arrived in the area, much of the Cedarburg area was an upland forest dominated by American beech and sugar maple trees. There were also white cedars growing along Cedar Creek. Much of the original forest was cleared to prepare the land for agriculture, and in the 21st century much of the town's land continues to be used for agriculture.

As land development continues to reduce wild areas, wildlife is forced into closer proximity with human communities like Cedarburg. Large mammals, including white-tailed deer, coyotes, and red foxes can be seen in the town. There have been infrequent sightings of black bears in Ozaukee County communities, including a 2005 report of a bear in a Cedarburg city park. Many birds, including sandhill cranes and wild turkeys are found in and around the town. The Wisconsin Bird Conservation Initiative considers the Cedarburg Bog, located north of the town in the Town of Saukville, to be a Wisconsin Important Bird Area. The rare Goldenseal plant grows in a woodland on the northern boundary between the town and the City of Cedarburg.

The region struggles with many invasive species, including the emerald ash borer, common carp, reed canary grass, the common reed, purple loosestrife, garlic mustard, Eurasian buckthorns, and honeysuckles.

== Demographics ==
As of the census of 2010, there were 5,760 people, 2,055 households, and 1,755 families residing in the town. The population density was 225 people per square mile (86.9/km^{2}). There were 2,127 housing units at an average density of 83.1 per square mile (32.1/km^{2}). The racial makeup of the town was 98.0% White, 0.4% Black or African American, 0.1% Native American, 0.7% Asian, 0.2% from other races, and 0.6% from two or more races. 1.3% of the population were Hispanic or Latino of any race.

There were 2,055 households, out of which 36.0% had children under the age of 18 living with them, 78.5% were married couples living together, 4.4% had a female householder with no husband present, and 14.6% were nonfamily households. 11.6% of all households were made up of individuals, and 5.4% had someone living alone who was 65 years of age or older. The average household size was 2.80 and the average family size was 3.05.

The median age was 45.1 years, with 26.6% of the population under the age of 18 and 13.5% aged 65 or older.

The 2017 American Community Survey estimated the median household income at $96,771 per year, with a median per capita income of $51,185; 3.9% of people in the town were estimated to have income below the poverty level.

== Law and government ==
The Town of Cedarburg is governed by an elected town board, comprising a chairman and four town supervisors. The current town chairman is David Salvaggio.

As part of Wisconsin's 6th congressional district, the town is represented by Glenn Grothman (R) in the United States House of Representatives, and by Ron Johnson (R) and Tammy Baldwin (D) in the United States Senate. Duey Stroebel (R) represents Cedarburg in the Wisconsin State Senate, and Robert Brooks (R) represents Cedarburg in the Wisconsin State Assembly.

=== Cedarburg Fire Department ===
Cedarburg's volunteer fire department was founded in 1866. There are two active fire stations in the community: one on Mequon Avenue in the City of Cedarburg, and the other on Covered Bridge Road in the Town of Cedarburg. Jeffrey Vahsholtz has served as fire chief since 2014.

Since 1966, the fire department has organized "Maxwell Street Days" flea markets each summer as a fundraiser.

== Education ==
Most of the Town of Cedarburg's public school students are served by the Cedarburg School District. The district has three elementary schools, serving grades kindergarten through fifth grade: Parkview Elementary, Thorson Elementary, and Westlawn Elementary. Each elementary school serves areas of the town and the city. Webster Middle School serves the entire district for grades six through eight, and Cedarburg High School serves grades nine through twelve. Some residents living in the northeastern part of the town are served by the Grafton School District.

The district is governed by a seven-member elected school board, which meets on the third Thursday of each month at Cedarburg High School. The district also a superintendent. Todd Bugnacki, the current superintendent, has held the position since 2015.

The district frequently appears on lists of the best schools in the state.

== Transportation ==
Cedarburg is located west of Interstate 43, which passes through the Town of Grafton. Wisconsin Highway 60 also runs through the town.

Cedarburg has limited public transit compared with larger cities. Ozaukee County and the Milwaukee County Transit System run the Route 143 commuter bus, also known as the "Ozaukee County Express," to Milwaukee via Interstate 43. The bus stops at the park-and-ride lot by Cedarburg's interstate on- and offramps. The bus operates eight trips to Milwaukee on weekday mornings and nine trips from Milwaukee on weekday evenings, corresponding to peak commute times. Ozaukee County Transit Services' Shared Ride Taxi is the public transit option for traveling to sites not directly accessible from the interstate. The taxis operate seven days a week and make connections to Washington County Transit and Milwaukee County Routes 12, 49 and 42u.

== Parks and recreation ==
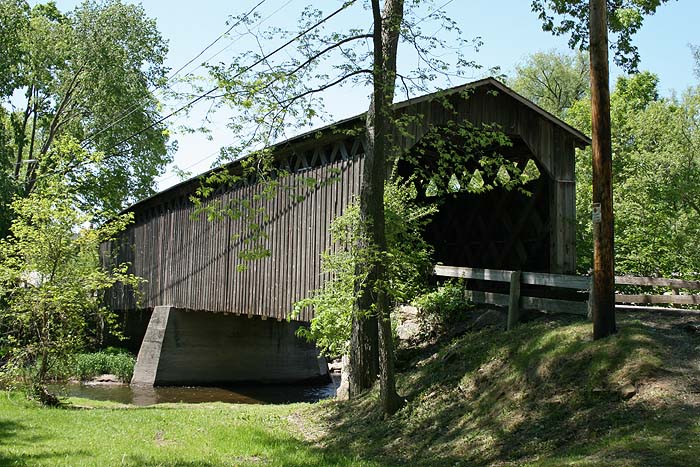
The historic Cedarburg covered bridge in Ozaukee County's Covered Bridge Park

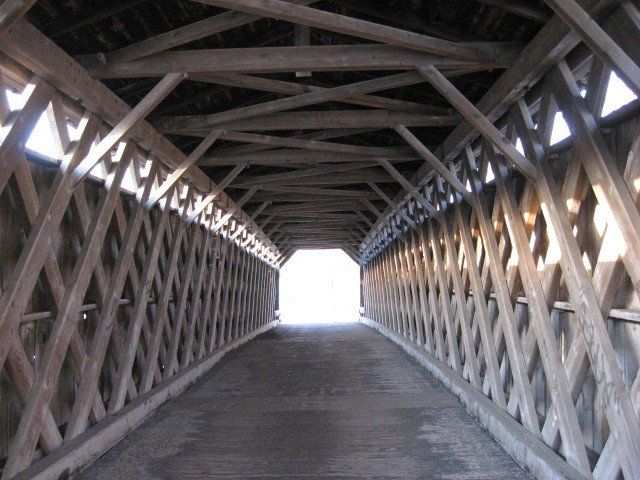
The interior of the Cedarburg covered bridge

The Town of Cedarburg maintains seven public parks, including three canoe access points on Cedar Creek, and the town also has parks maintained by Ozaukee County and the Ozaukee Washington Land Trust. The town recreation department offers little league baseball, flag football, track and field, and soccer.

=== Town parks ===
- Cedar Creek Farms Canoe Launch: A 0.33-acre park on Cedar Creek with a paved parking lot and a wooden canoe launch platform, which functions best in spring when water levels are at their peak.
- Creekside Park: A 0.56-acre park with a canoe access point and gravel parking area. The parks wooded and riparian areas also provide opportunities for birdwatching.
- Hamilton Park: Located in the Hamilton Historic District, this 1-acre park has picnic tables and an historical marker.
- Krohn Park: An 11-acre park on the banks of Cedar Creek, alone Covered Bridge Road. The park has walking trails, a canoe access point, and an historical marker about the 19th century Kaehlers Mill settlement which was located at the site.
- Orthopaedic Hospital of Wisconsin Fields: A 5.26-park outdoor athletic area with two baseball fields.
- Pleasant Valley Park: An 88-acre park co-owned by the Town of Cedarburg and the City of Cedarburg on the site of a former landfill. Visitors can experience a variety of biomes, including woodlands, prairies, and a bog, as well as landforms including glacially formed kettles and Mole Creek. The park has a parking lot, a picnic shelter with restrooms, a Boy Scout campground, mountain biking trails, walking trails, and boardwalks.

=== County and land trust parks ===
- Covered Bridge Park: A 12-acre park maintained by Ozaukee County and contains the last 19th century covered bridge in Wisconsin, which spans Cedar Creek. Constructed in 1876, the bridge was once one of over 40 covered bridges in the state and was used for wagon and automobile traffic until 1962. It was listed on the National Register of Historic Places in 1973 and is now used only for pedestrian traffic. The park also has picnic and fishing areas and canoe access points.
- Cedarburg Environmental Study Area: A 38-acre nature area maintained by the Ozaukee Washington Land Trust and containing wetlands, ponds, open meadow, conifer forests and mixed hardwood forests with a diversity of wildlife and opportunities for birdwatching.

== Notable people ==
- Paul Clement, United States Solicitor General, was born in the town
- Humphrey J. Desmond, Wisconsin legislator, lawyer, writer, and newspaper editor
- William Henry Fitzgerald, Wisconsin State Representative, was born in the town prior to Wisconsin's statehood
- George P. Harrington, Wisconsin legislator
- Eugene J. Poole, Wisconsin State Representative, was born in the town
