= Wayside House =

Historic house in Wisconsin, United States

- U.S. National Register of Historic Places
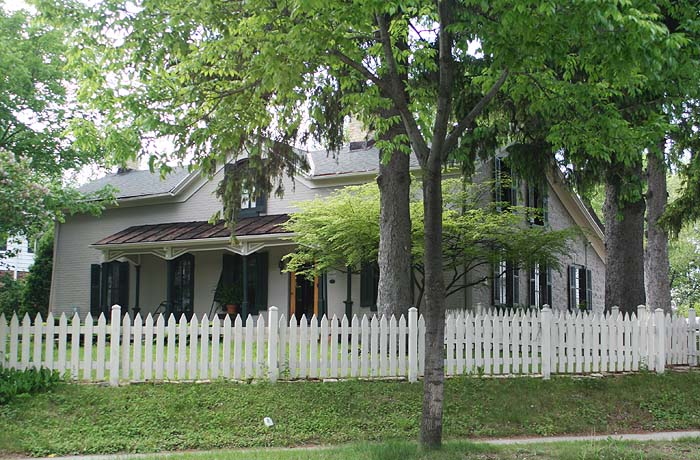

- Location within Wisconsin Location within the United States
- Interactive map showing the location of Wayside House
- Location: W61 N439 Washington Ave. Cedarburg, Wisconsin
- Coordinates: 43°17′31″N 87°59′11″W
- Area: 0.22 acres (0.089 ha)
- Built: 1846
- Architect: Fredrick Hilgen
- Architectural style: Victorian
- NRHP reference No.: 82000694
- Added to NRHP: March 17, 1982

The Wayside House (also known as the Hilgen-Schuette House) is a historic house located in Cedarburg, Wisconsin. It was built by Frederick Hilgen, who later co-owned the Cedarburg Mill, and is considered the father of Cedarburg. It was added to the National Register of Historic Places on March 17, 1982.

== Description and history ==
Frederick Hilgen immigrated from Germany in 1832, working as a clerk and serving in a state militia. In 1844, he bought undeveloped land northwest of Milwaukee, including the site of this house. He had that land platted and it became the village of Cedarburg. He and William Schroeder built a grist mill on Cedar Creek in 1845.

In 1846, he built the first section of what would become the Wayside House on a wooded knoll. It was originally one story, with walls of coursed fieldstone, but it's difficult to tell because Hilgen kept expanding the house over the years. The current house is two stories, with a cross-gable roof and some walls clad in cream bricks. The front entrance is sheltered by an open wooden porch. By 1900, it had reached its current configuration. The house's second owner was John Schuette, and it's sometimes called the Hilgen-Schuette House.

Hilgen went on to found the Cedarburg Mill in 1855 and the Wittenberg Woolen Mill in 1864.
