= Covered Bridge (Cedarburg, Wisconsin) =

- U.S. National Register of Historic Places
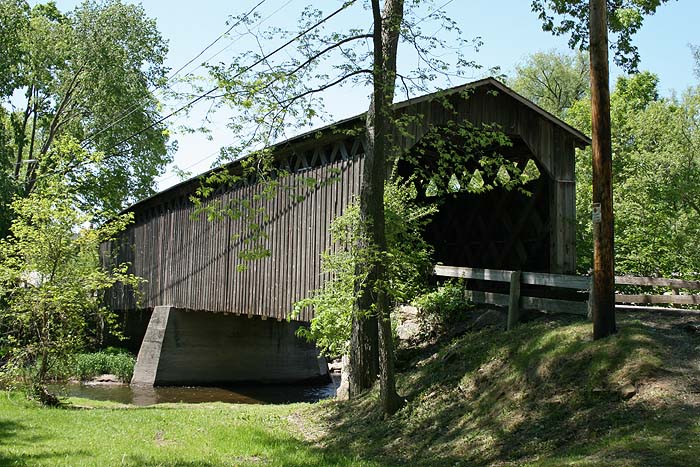
- Covered Bridge in May 2009

- Location within Wisconsin Location within the United States
- Nearest city: Cedarburg, Wisconsin
- Coordinates: 43°20′15″N 88°0′18″W
- Area: Less than 1 acre (0.40 ha)
- Built: 1876
- Architectural style: Latticed timber truss
- NRHP reference No.: 73000092
- Added to NRHP: March 14, 1973

The Covered Bridge (originally called Red Bridge) in Cedarburg, Ozaukee County, Wisconsin, United States, is one of the last remaining covered bridges in that state, which once had about 40 covered bridges. Built in 1876 to cross Cedar Creek, the bridge is 120 feet (37 m) long and is made of pine with oak lattices. It was listed on the National Register of Historic Places in 1973 and is now used only for pedestrian traffic.

== History ==
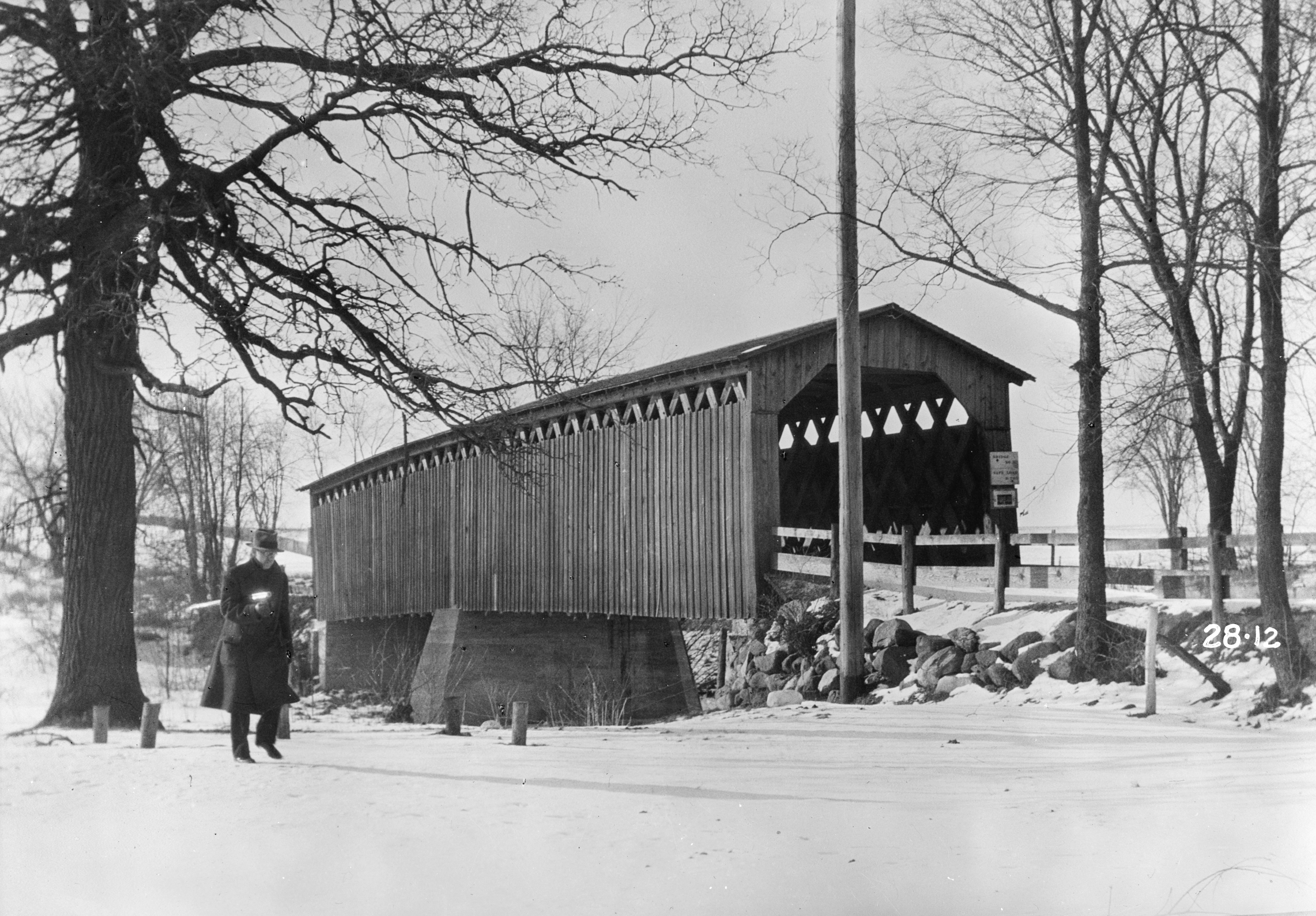
The Covered Bridge in 1937

The bridge was built in 1876, the result of a petition by area farmers. It was constructed to serve as a permanent replacement for previous bridges that had washed out on various occasions. In 1927, an abutment was added under the center of the bridge to support heavier vehicle traffic, such as cars and trucks, which were not present at the time of the original construction.

The Ozaukee County Board took over the bridge's preservation and maintenance in 1940.

In 1960, Ozaukee County bought the bridge and surrounding land for $7,500 and developed the area into Covered Bridge County Park.

After nearly a century of continuous use, the bridge began to suffer, with the heavy traffic loosening the planks. It was decided that the only way to preserve the bridge was to alleviate the burden. In 1962, the Park Commission made the choice to relocate the bridge by moving it off the abutments to a location approximately 50 feet (15 m) east of where it was. It was also restricted to pedestrian traffic. A second, modern bridge was built beside it to the west, only a few yards away. This new bridge is now used for vehicular traffic on the adjacent Covered Bridge Road. The original bridge was listed on the National Register of Historic Places on March 14, 1973.

In 2009, the county planned to spend over $19,000 on capital improvements for the Covered Bridge County Park, with part of the money to be used for new decking and railings for the bridge.

== Construction and specifications ==
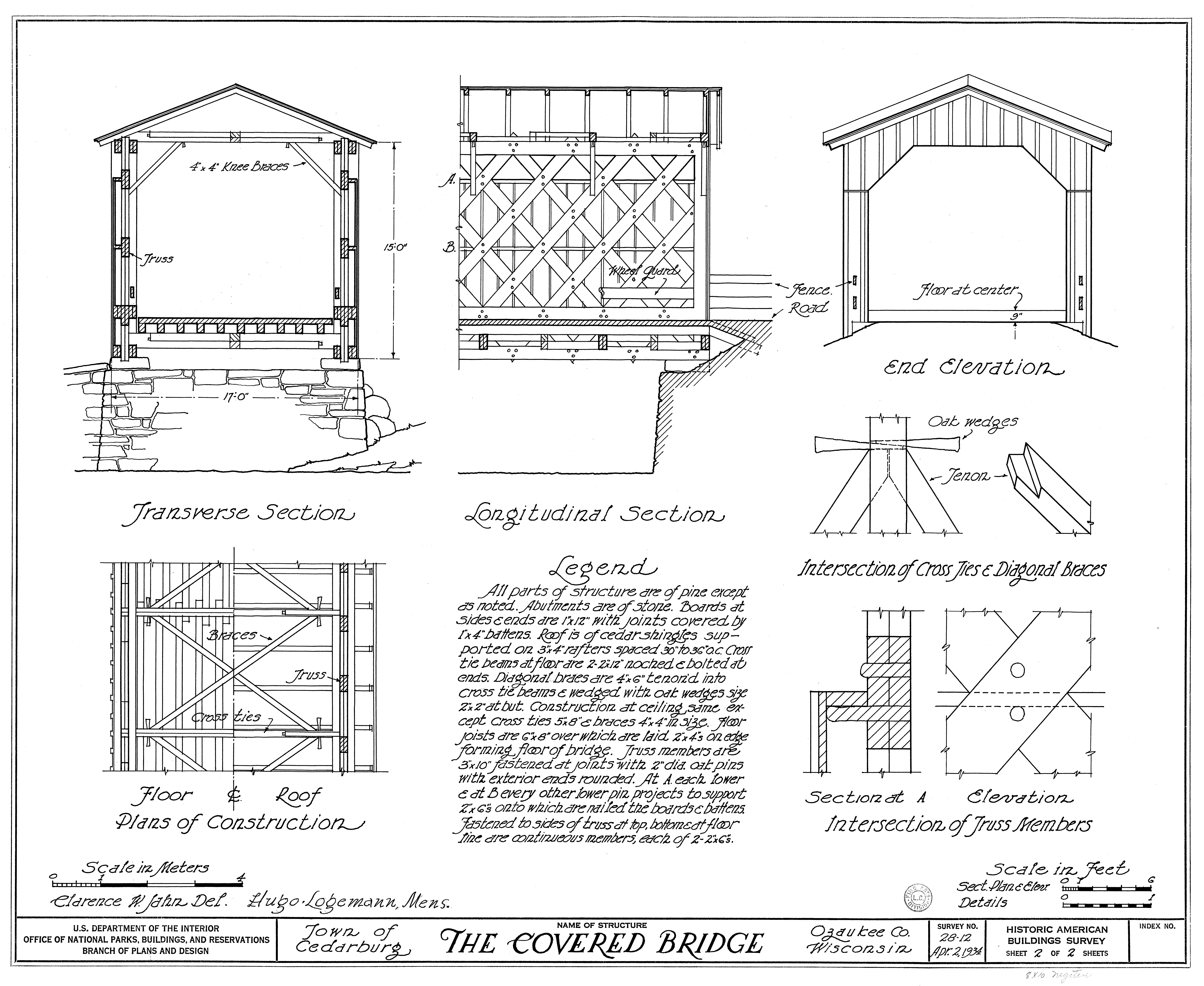
1937 Historic American Buildings Survey sketch

The Covered Bridge is situated in a north–south orientation over Cedarburg Creek. It is a timber lattice truss bridge, and was originally 120 feet (37 m) long. It is 17 feet (5.2 m) wide, and has a height of about 18 feet (5.5 m) from the top of the abutments to the tip of the roof. The interior, from the deck to the top of the knee braces is approximately 13 feet (4.0 m).

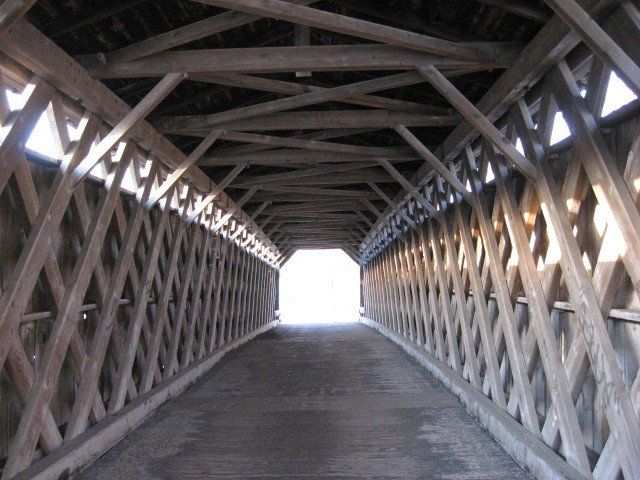
Interior

The bridge was built using oak and pine timbers, wood that was prepared at a site near Baraboo, Wisconsin. The lattices are very large, made of oak, and were assembled without the use of bolts or nails. Instead, the trusses, consisting of 3-by-10-inch (76 by 254 mm) planks, are secured at the joints using oak pegs measuring 2 inches (51 mm) in diameter, and having rounded ends. The boards used at the sides and ends measure 1 by 12 inches (25 by 305 mm), and have joints covered by 1-by-4-inch (25 by 102 mm) battens. There are diagonal braces that measure 4 by 7 inches (100 by 180 mm), and are tenoned to fit into cross tie beams, and fitted with 2-by-2-inch (51 by 51 mm) oak wedges.

The roof is shingled with cedar over 3-by-4-inch (76 by 102 mm) rafters spaced 30 to 36 inches (760 to 910 mm) apart. The cross tie beams at the floor are notched and bolted at each end.

The floor joists, measuring 6 by 8 inches (150 by 200 mm), are decked with 2-by-4-inch (51 by 102 mm) wood laid on edge forming the deck. The interior walls were lined with a protective wheel guard about one foot above the deck.

The abutments are made of fieldstone set in white mortar. They are 17 feet (5.2 m) wide where they meet the deck of the bridge, widening toward the ground to about 18 feet (5.5 m). The center abutment was originally also made of fieldstone, but sometime before 1937 was replaced with concrete.

== Plaques and historical markers ==
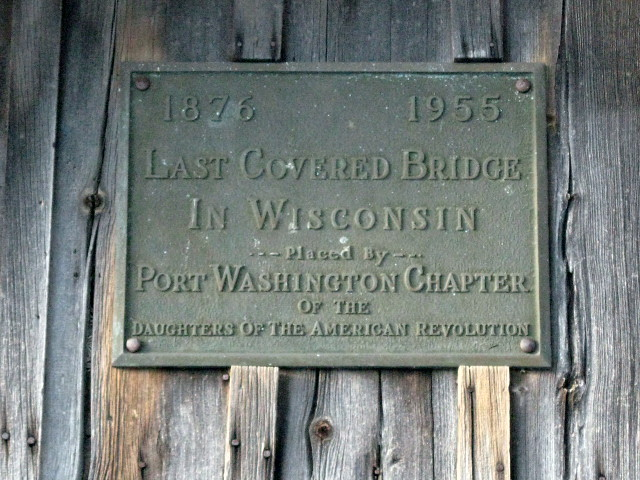
Plaque placed by the Port Washington Chapter of the Daughters of the American Revolution

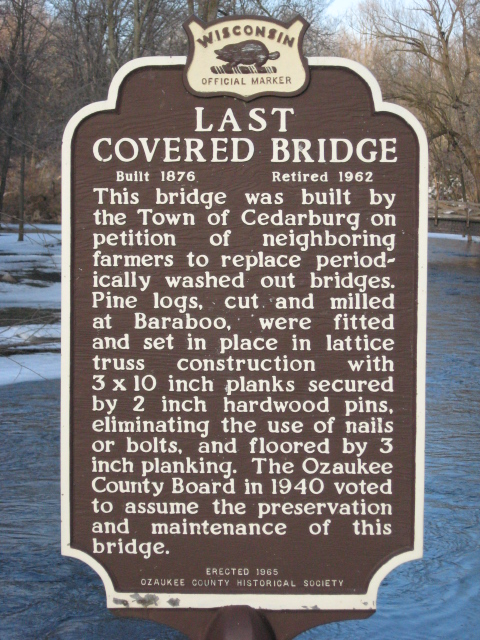
Historical marker

The bridge displays a plaque, placed on it in 1955 by the Port Washington Chapter of the Daughters of the American Revolution, that identifies it as the "last covered bridge in Wisconsin" and lists the dates of 1876 and 1955. In 1965 a historical marker was erected in front of the bridge by the Ozaukee County Historical Society which identifies it as "Last Covered Bridge" and states that it was built in 1876 and "retired" in 1962.

== Replicas ==
A replica of the Covered Bridge, named the Springwater Volunteer Bridge, was built in 1997 in Waushara County, Wisconsin.

The Covered Bridge at Stonefield (Wisconsin) historic site near Cassville, Wisconsin is based upon the Cedarburg Bridge. The 50' span was constructed by the Wisconsin Historical Society based upon the WPA drawings.

== See also ==
- List of bridges documented by the Historic American Engineering Record in Wisconsin
- List of bridges on the National Register of Historic Places in Wisconsin
- National Register of Historic Places listings in Ozaukee County, Wisconsin
