= Hamilton, Ozaukee County, Wisconsin =

Unincorporated community in Ozaukee County, Wisconsin

Hamilton, Wisconsin
- Unincorporated community
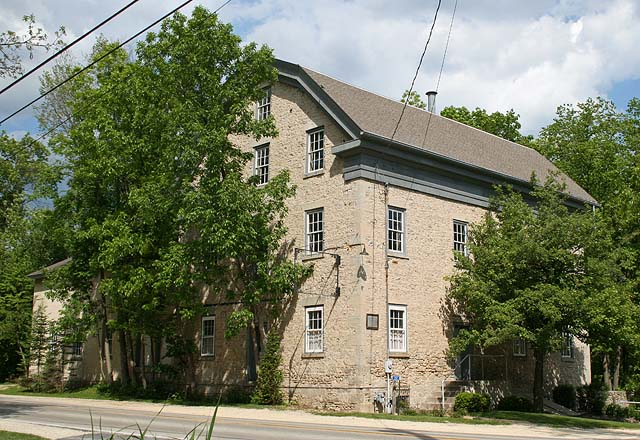
- Concordia Mill

- Location within Wisconsin Location within the United States
- Coordinates: 43°17′03″N 87°58′18″W
- Country: United States
- State: Wisconsin
- County: Ozaukee
- Elevation: 696 ft (212 m)
- Time zone: UTC-6 (Central (CST))
  - Summer (DST): UTC-5 (CDT)
- Area code: 262
- GNIS feature ID: 1566010
- Hamilton Historic District
- U.S. National Register of Historic Places
- U.S. Historic district
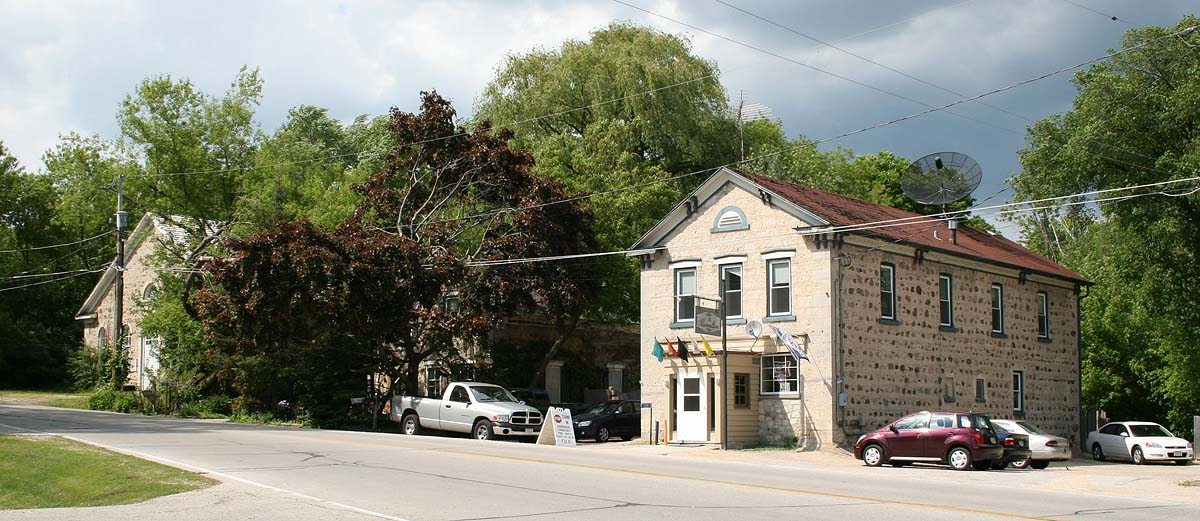
- A portion of the district.
- Location: Cedarburg, Wisconsin
- NRHP reference No.: 76000070
- Added to NRHP: July 1, 1976

Hamilton is an unincorporated community located in the Town of Cedarburg, Ozaukee County, Wisconsin, United States. Much of the community is part of the Hamilton Historic District, a site listed on the National Register of Historic Places. The NRHP-listed Concordia Mill is also located in the community.

== History ==
Hamilton was settled by Irish immigrants in the early 1840s. It was originally named "New Dublin" and was the first white settlement in the Cedarburg area. The first documented resident was Joseph Gardenier, who built a log shanty on Cedar Creek as his headquarters for surveying for the construction of the Green Bay Road. It was renamed in 1847 after William S. Hamilton, a member of the legislature of the Wisconsin Territory and son of Alexander Hamilton, the first U.S. Secretary of Treasury. In 1848, Hamilton became the first stop on the stagecoach route between Milwaukee and Green Bay. The community prospered until the Chicago, Milwaukee & St. Paul Railway was built in nearby Cedarburg in 1870. Cedarburg grew into an incorporated city, overshadowing rural Hamilton.

In 1974, Hamilton was designated a historic site by the Wisconsin State Historical Society, and the Hamilton Historic District was added to the National Register of Historic Places in 1976.
