= Cedar Creek (Wisconsin) =

Stream in southeastern Wisconsin

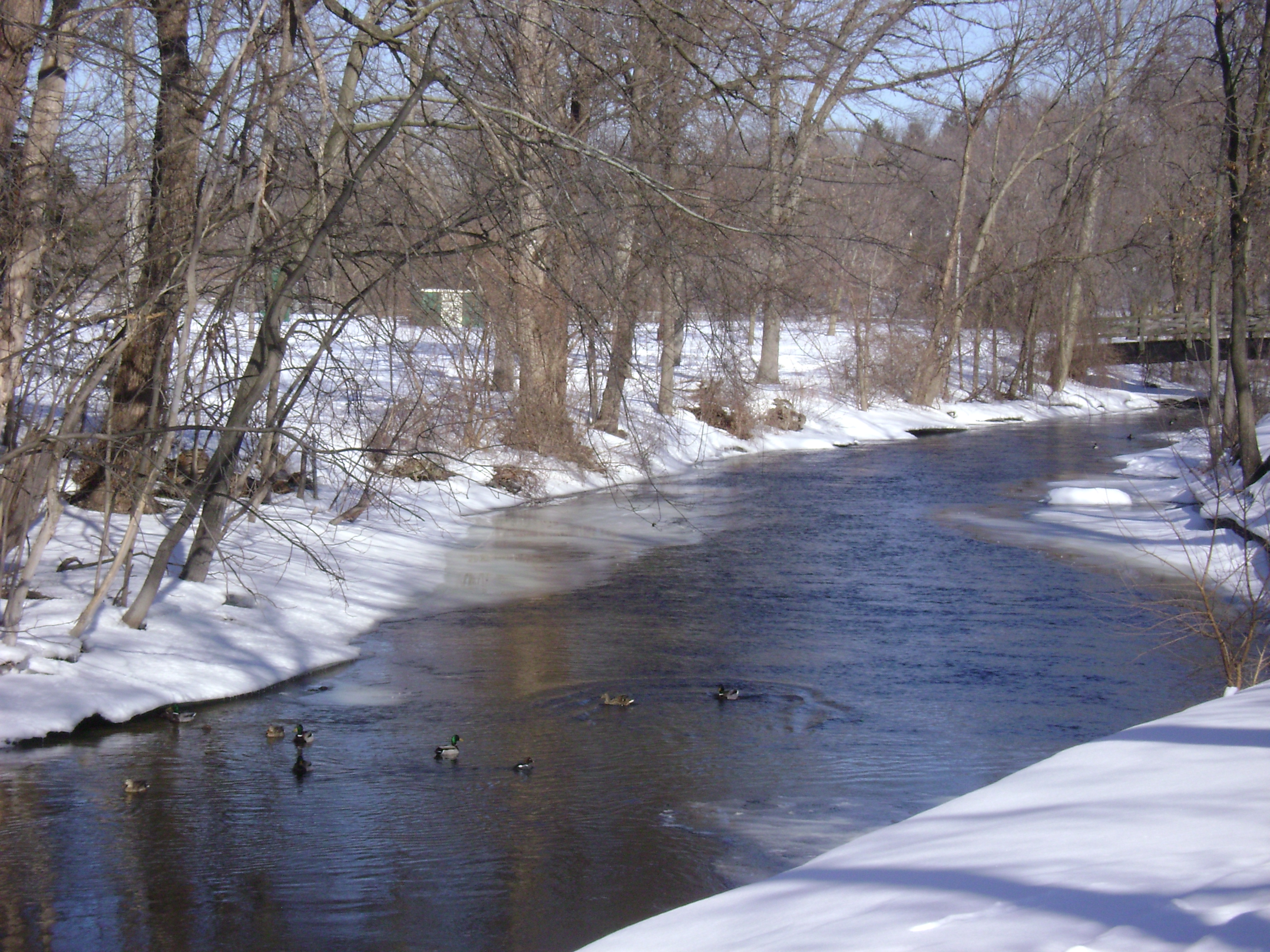

Location
- Country: United States
- State: Wisconsin

Physical characteristics
- Source: Big Cedar Lake
  - location: West Bend, Wisconsin
  - elevation: 1,000 feet (300 m)
- Mouth: Milwaukee River
  - location: Grafton, Wisconsin
  - elevation: 678 feet (207 m)
- Length: 33 miles (53 km)
- Basin size: 127 square miles (330 km^{2})
- Width
  - average: 57 feet (17 m)
- Depth
  - average: 1.6 feet (0.49 m)
- Discharge
  - location: Wisconsin Highway 60 (USGS 04086500)
  - average: 52 cubic feet per second (1.5 m^{3}/s)

Basin features
- Progression: Cedar Creek→ Milwaukee River→ Lake Michigan
- Landmarks: Covered Bridge; Cedarburg Mill; Cedar Creek
- Population: 1.3 million
- Waterbodies: Little Cedar Lake
- Bridges: 40

Cedar Creek is a 53-kilometre-long (33 mi) stream in southeastern Wisconsin in the United States. The Cedar Creek watershed is a 330 km^{2} (127 mi^{2}) sub-basin of the larger Milwaukee River watershed.

== Description ==
Cedar Creek originates from Big Cedar Lake in the Town of West Bend and flows east into Little Cedar Lake. It then flows east through Jackson before turning south, crossing State Highway 60 where there is a USGS gauge and briefly flows through Grafton before entering Cedarburg's north side. The creek flows through downtown Cedarburg, and empties into the Milwaukee River southeast of Cedarburg in the Town of Grafton. The lower section through Cedarburg is notable for its the steep slope, and early settlers made use of this by building several mills and accompanying dams.

The lower portion of the creek through downtown Cedarburg until its confluence with the Milwaukee River is impacted by the milldams and PCB pollution produced by Mercury Marine and Amcast automotive. Numerous cleanups have occurred, including a 2018 cleanup from the Cedarburg Mill's pond to the Cedarburg Wire and Nail Factory dam was completed in 2018.

== Mills ==
Several mills dammed the lower portion of Cedar Creek in the mid and late 19th century. The mills proved successful and had large impacts on the local economy. By the early 20th century many of the mills had moved away from hydropower to more reliable steam or electric power. Financial trouble for the mills began during the Great Depression and continued into later decades as larger mills and factories outcompeted the small mills. By the late 1960s, all the mills had either ceased operations, and some buildings have been converted to commercial uses, while others were abandoned unused or demolished.

Mills on Cedar Creek
Mill Name	Year built	Products Produced	Notes
Concordia Mill	1853	Grain	Dam washed out and removed 1996
Cedarburg Wire and Nail Factory	1871	Grain, lumber, drawn steel, hydroelectricity	
Columbia Mill	1843	Grain	Demolished
Cedarburg Mill	1844	Grain	Rebuilt 1855 with current stone structure
Hilgen and Wittenberg Woolen Mill	1864	Textiles	

== Flooding ==
Cedar Creek is normally a small low discharge stream, however like many streams it experiences regular flooding. In 1881, a sudden spring melt caused severe flooding that washed out all the dams on Cedar Creek except the one at the Cedarburg Mill. The flood also washed away at least one bridge. Large floods occurred in 1952, 1959, 1960, and 1975. In 1996, flooding washed out the dam at the Concordia Mill. Its millpond contained PCBs, and the washout complicated the cleanup by sending PCBs downstream.

Cedar Creek Flood Discharges
Location	Drained Area (km^{2})	20 Year Flood (m^{3}/s)	50 Year Flood (m^{3}/s)	100 Year Flood (m^{3}/s)	500 Year Flood (m^{3}/s)
County Highway I	280	71	128	157	184
State Highway 60 USGS Gage 04086500	303	75	134	165	194
At outlet	320	76	138	169	200

== Parks ==
Public Parks along Cedar Creek
Name	Municipality
Adlai Horn Park, Cedar Creek Park, Boy Scout Park	Cedarburg
Grafton Lions Park	Grafton
Covered Bridge Park, Town of Cedarburg Canoe Launch	Town of Cedarburg
Jackson Marsh State natural Area	Jackson

== Bridges ==
Road and Railroad Bridges and Crossings on Cedar Creek
Road/Railroad Name	Times Crossed	Notes
Green Bay Rd	1	
Lakefield Rd	1	Washed out in the great spring flood of 1881, later rebuilt.
Canadian National Railroad	4	
Private	1	
Highland Avenue	1	Site of the Highland Avenue Bridge, built in 1939 as a PWA project.
Columbia Rd	1	
Bridge Rd	1	Original stone arch bridge re-decked, but original arches still visible.
State Highway 60	5	
Cedar Creek Rd	3	
County Highway I	1	
Covered Bridge Rd	1	Site of the last covered bridge.
Kaehlers Mill Rd	1	
County Highway NN	2	
County Highway Y	1	
County Highway M	1	
County Highway G	1	
Hickory Ln	1	
Sherman Rd	2	
Western Ave	1	
County Highway P	1	
Interstate 45	1	
South Mayfield Rd	1	
Lily Rd	2	
Scenic Dr	2	
County Highway C	1	
Pleasant Valley Rd	1	
Hillside Rd	1	
