= Eugene J. Poole =

American farmer and politician

Eugene J. Poole (November 5, 1880 – April 10, 1958) was an American farmer and politician.

Born in the Town of Cedarburg, Ozaukee County, Wisconsin, Poole was a farmer. He was also in the funeral home and tavern businesses. Poole served in the Wisconsin State Assembly in 1915 and 1917 and was a Democrat. Poole died at a hospital in West Bend, Wisconsin.
