= Decker Corner, Wisconsin =

Unincorporated community in Ozaukee County, Wisconsin

- Unincorporated community
- Location within Wisconsin Location within the United States
- Coordinates: 43°21′05″N 88°02′42″W
- Country: United States
- State: Wisconsin
- County: Ozaukee
- Elevation: 863 ft (263 m)
- Time zone: UTC-6 (Central (CST))
  - Summer (DST): UTC-5 (CDT)
- Area code: 262
- GNIS feature ID: 1563796

Decker Corner is an unincorporated community in the Town of Cedarburg, Ozaukee County, Wisconsin, United States.

Decker Corner was named for a family who lived at the local crossroads.
