= Horns Corners, Wisconsin =

Unincorporated community in Ozaukee County, Wisconsin

- Unincorporated community
- Location within Wisconsin Location within the United States
- Coordinates: 43°20′29″N 88°01′26″W
- Country: United States
- State: Wisconsin
- County: Ozaukee
- Elevation: 843 ft (257 m)
- Time zone: UTC-6 (Central (CST))
  - Summer (DST): UTC-5 (CDT)
- Area code: 262
- GNIS feature ID: 1566705

Horns Corners is an unincorporated community in the Town of Cedarburg, Ozaukee County, Wisconsin, United States.

== History ==
A post office called Horn's Corners was established in 1857, and remained in operation until 1910. The community was named for Frederick W. Horn, who owned land in the area.
