= Edwin J. Nieman Sr. House =

Historic house in Wisconsin, United States

- U.S. National Register of Historic Places
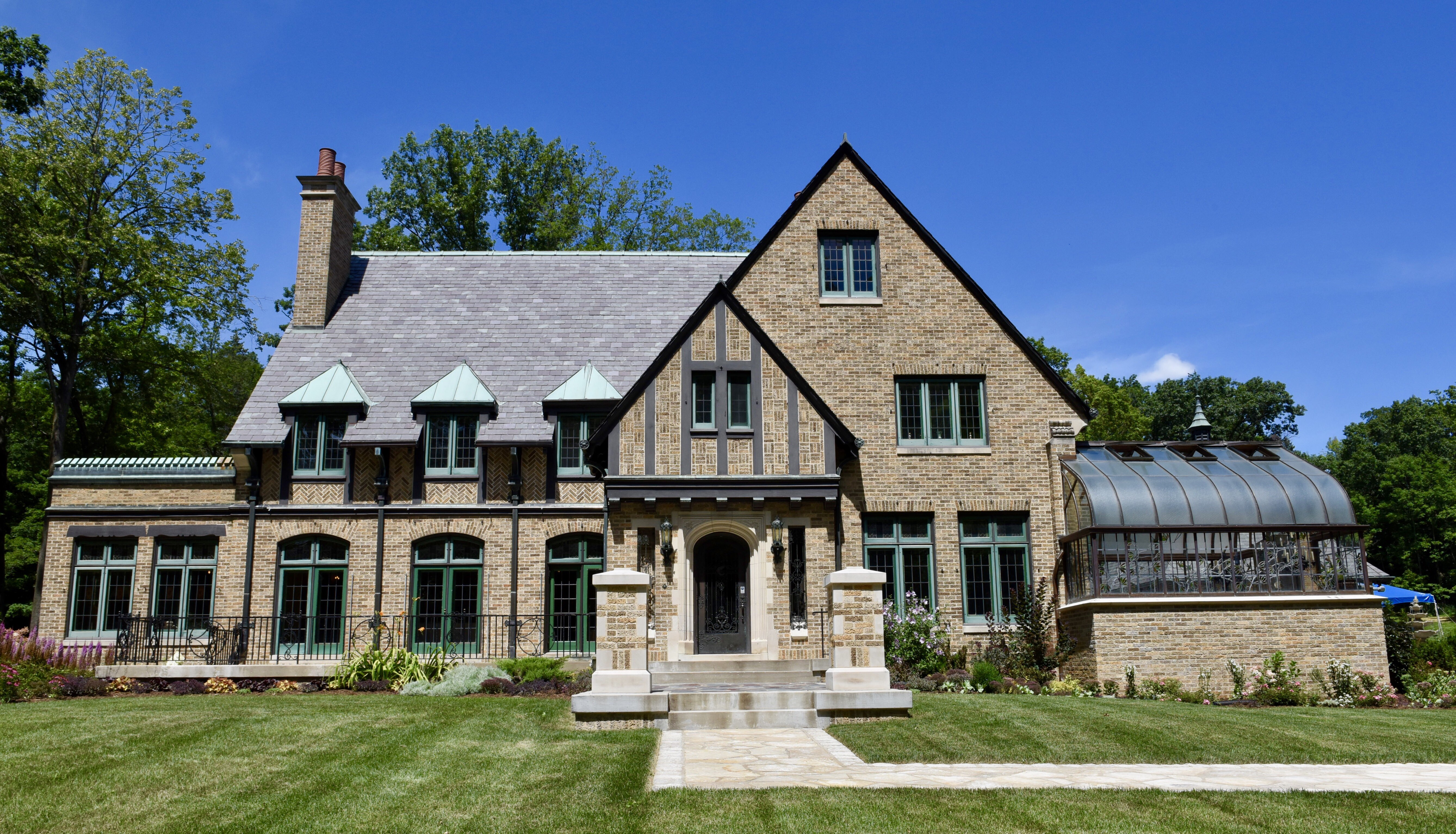
- Edwin J. Nieman Sr. House

- Location within Wisconsin Location within the United States
- Location: 13030 N. Cedarburg Rd., Mequon, Wisconsin
- Coordinates: 43°15′19″N 87°59′25″W
- Area: 4 acres (1.6 ha)
- Built: 1928
- Architect: Bruns, Herman; Vollmar & Gruenwald
- Architectural style: Tudor Revival
- NRHP reference No.: 96000418
- Added to NRHP: April 12, 1996

The Edwin J. Nieman Sr. House is a historic house located at 13030 North Cedarburg Road in Mequon, Wisconsin. The house was added to the National Register of Historic Places on April 12, 1996.

== Description and history ==
Built in 1928, the house was designed by Herman Bruns in the Tudor Revival style. Designed to resemble a country house, the house includes a glass conservatory with a fountain, stained glass windows, and wrought iron fixtures. Edwin J. Nieman Sr., the home's owner, was a partner in the Fromm Bros.-Nieman Co., at the time the largest silver fox breeder in the nation; the home originally bordered one of the firm's fox farms on all sides. Nieman lived in the house until he died in 1985.
