= Little Cedar Lake (Wisconsin) =

Lake in Wisconsin, United States

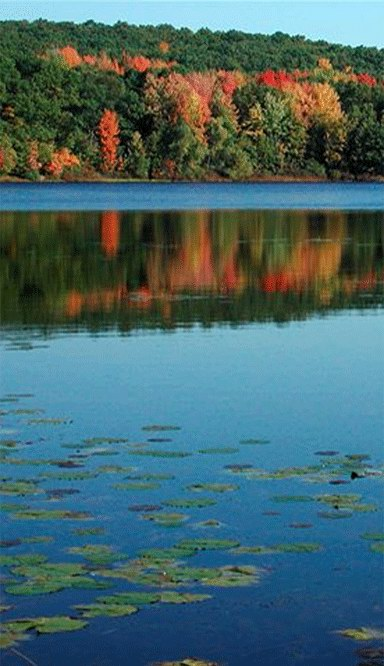

- Location within Wisconsin Location within the United States
- Location: Town of West Bend, Town of Polk, in Washington County, Wisconsin
- Coordinates: 43°22′35″N 88°13′38″W
- Primary inflows: Cedar Creek
- Primary outflows: Cedar Creek
- Basin countries: United States
- Max. length: 1.5 mi (2.4 km)
- Max. width: 0.7 mi (1.1 km)
- Surface area: 246 acres (1 km^{2})
- Max. depth: 56 ft (17 m)
- Shore length^{1}: 4.5 mi (7.2 km)
- Surface elevation: 1,014 ft (309 m)
- Islands: 1 (Unnamed)
- ^{1} Shore length is not a well-defined measure.

Little Cedar Lake is a lake in Southeastern Wisconsin; United States. It is located at the geographic center of Washington County, in the Town of West Bend, and Town of Polk. The lake covers an area of 246 acres (1 km^{2}), has a shoreline of 4.5 miles (7 km), and reaches a maximum depth of 56 feet (17 m). Its source is Cedar Creek which flows into the northwest side of the lake, and its outflow is Cedar Creek, which continues to flow south at the bottom a small dam at the extreme southern tip of the lake. Spring, summer and autumn activities on the lake include boating, fishing, and water skiing. In winter the lake freezes over completely with ice up to 36 inches thick, Winter activities on the lake include ice fishing and snowmobiling. Many species of fish are found in Little Cedar Lake, including northern pike, walleye, rock bass, smallmouth bass, bluegills, carp, and bullheads. The Lake is located approximately 30 mi (48 km) NNW of Milwaukee, and 5 mi (8.0 km) SW of the City of West Bend and accessible by Ackerman's Grove County Park.

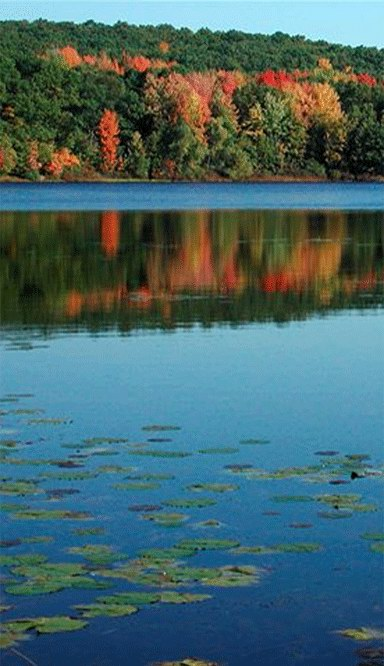
Fall Colors Reflecting on the Lake

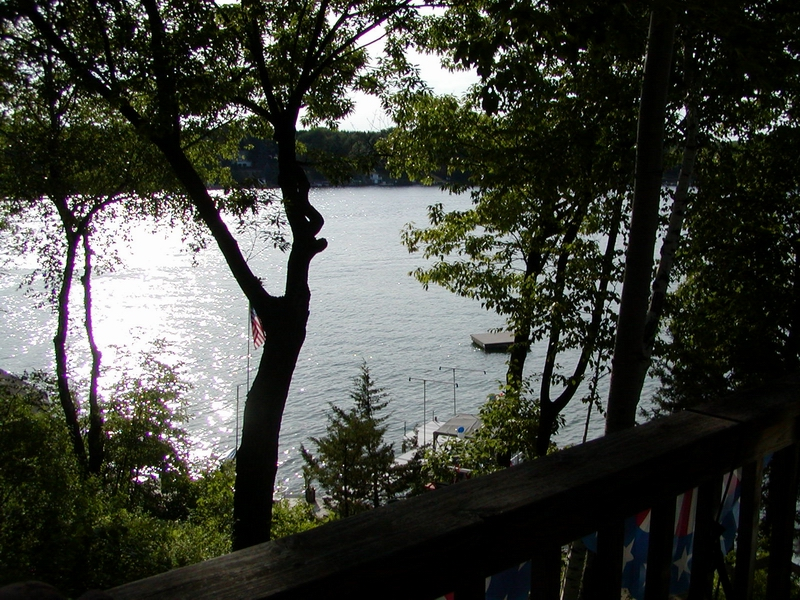
Reflecting Sun

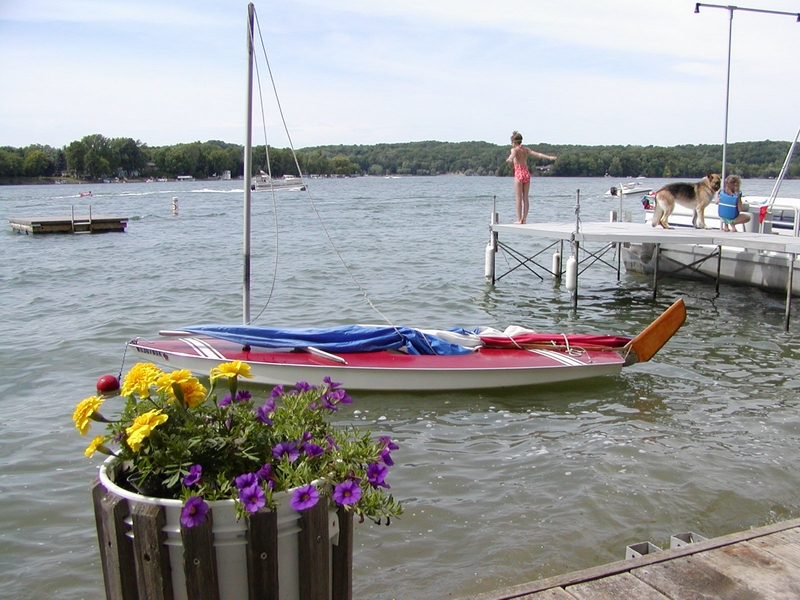
Summer Recreation

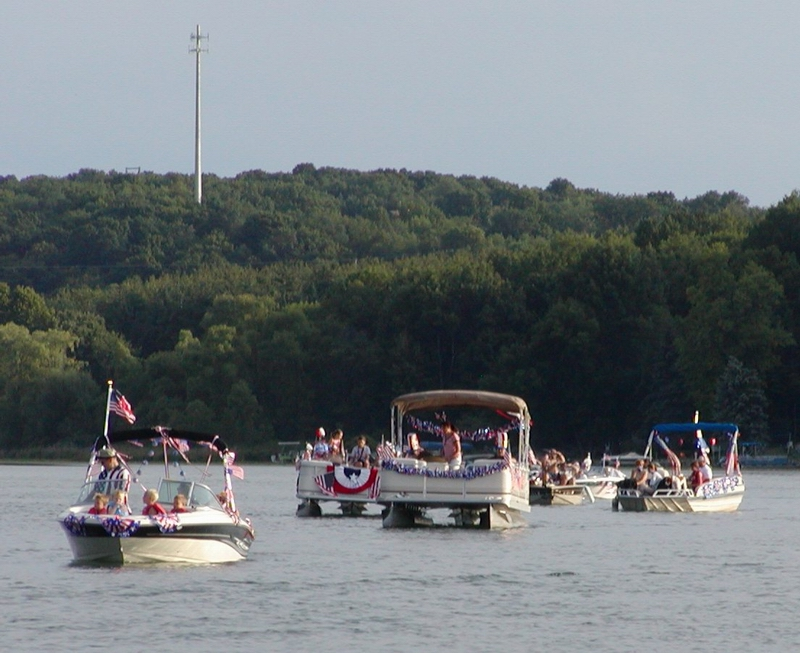
Independence Day Boat Parade

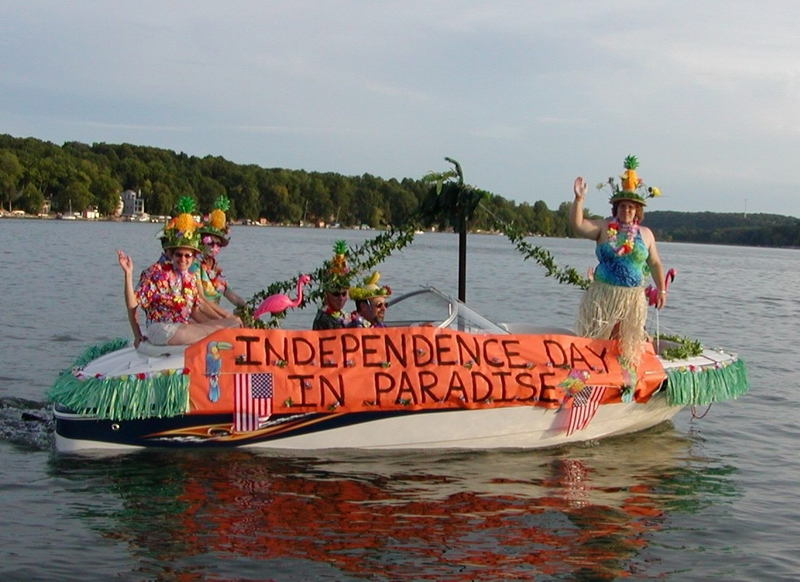
Best Parade Boat

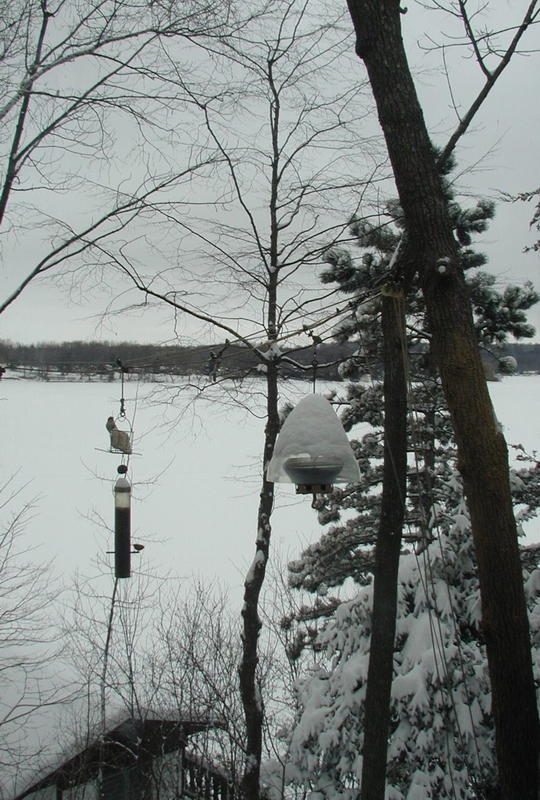
Frozen lake
