= Thiensville, Wisconsin =

Village in Ozaukee County, Wisconsin

Thiensville
- Village
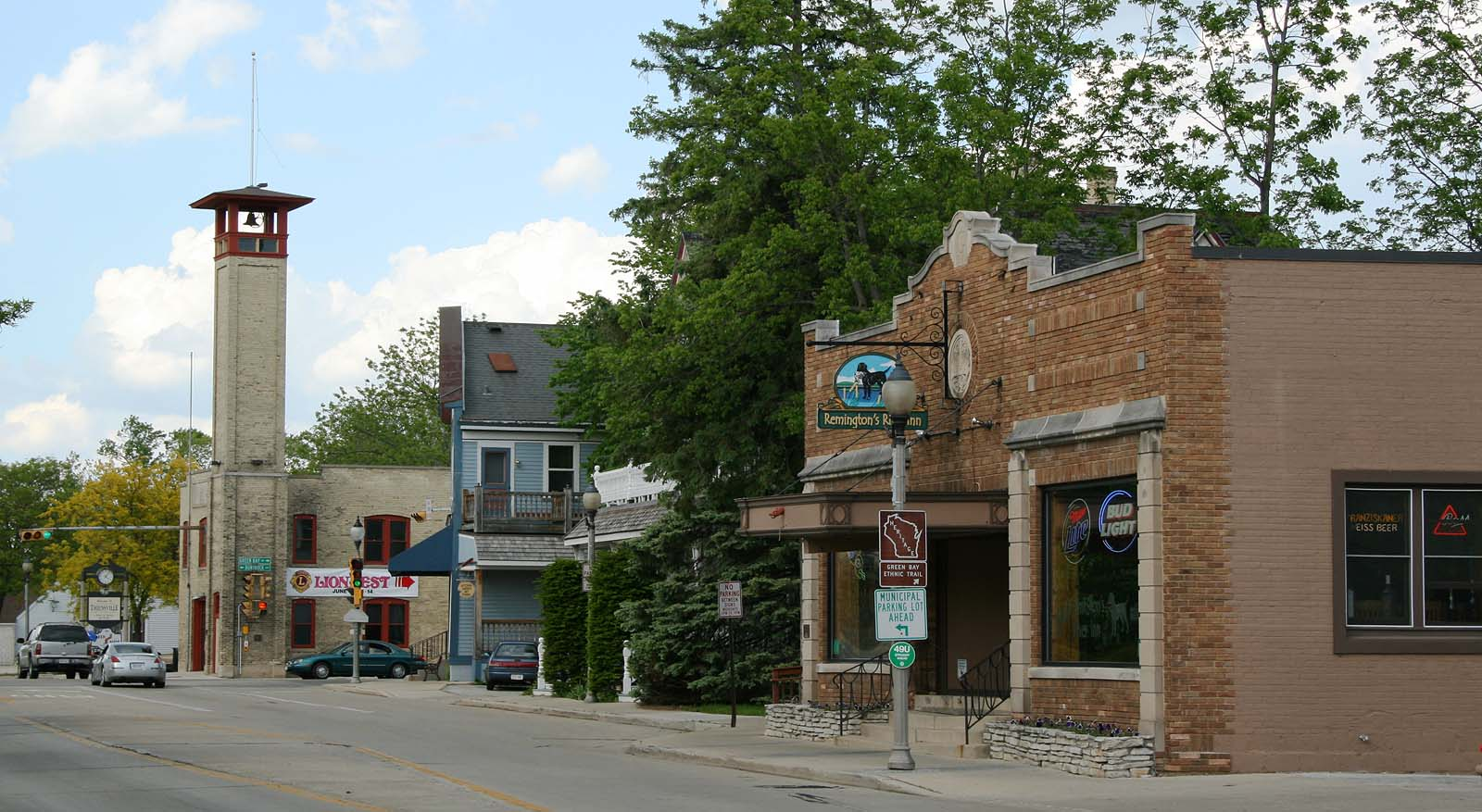
- Thiensville's Main Street Historic District

- Location of Thiensville in Ozaukee County, Wisconsin.

- Location within Wisconsin
- Coordinates: 43°14′13″N 87°58′48″W
- Country: United States
- State: Wisconsin
- County: Ozaukee
- Settled: c. 1837
- Incorporated: 1910; 116 years ago

Government
  - Village President: John R. Rosing
  - Administrator: Colleen Landisch-Hansen
  - Clerk/treasurer: Amy Langlois
  - Village board: Trustees: Angelina Apostolos; Jennifer Abraham; Rob Holyoke; Kenneth C. Kucharski; David A. Lange; Kristina Eckert

Area
  - Total: 1.08 sq mi (2.79 km^{2})
  - Land: 1.04 sq mi (2.69 km^{2})
  - Water: 0.039 sq mi (0.10 km^{2})
- Elevation: 676 ft (206 m)

Population (2020)
  - Total: 3,290
  - Density: 3,170/sq mi (1,220/km^{2})
- Time zone: UTC-6 (Central (CST))
  - Summer (DST): UTC-5 (CDT)
- Area code: 262
- FIPS code: 55-79475
- GNIS feature ID: 1575351
- Website: village.thiensville.wi.us

Thiensville is a village in Ozaukee County, Wisconsin, United States. Located on the west bank of a bend in the Milwaukee River, the community is bordered on all sides by the City of Mequon and is a suburb in the Milwaukee metropolitan area. The population was 3,290 at the 2020 census.

Thiensville was the site of a Potawatomi village in the early 19th century before white settlers began arriving in the 1830s and 1840s. Many of the community's earliest settlers were German immigrants who were members of freethinker societies. One prominent freethinker was Joachim Heinrich Thien, for whom the village is named. Thien played a significant role in the Town of Mequon's early politics and organized the Thiensville Volunteer Fire Department. The freethinkers were opposed to organized religion and actively prevented churches from being established in the community for the first eight decades of its history. Thiensville grew and prospered in the late 1800s when it became a railway stop; the community became more urban with stores, mills and services for farmers in the rural Town of Mequon. The Village of Thiensville formally incorporated in 1910.

Both Mequon and Thiensville experienced significant development during the suburbanization that followed World War II, with Mequon incorporating as a city in 1957. The two communities have close ties, with a shared chamber of commerce, library, fire and emergency medical services, and school district.

== History ==
In the early 19th century, the Potawatomi lived on the west bank of the Milwaukee River and had a village in present-day Thiensville, located on Pigeon Creek, north of Freistadt Road. They surrendered their land to the United States federal government through the 1833 Treaty of Chicago, which was ratified in 1835 and required them to leave the area by 1838.

The first permanent white settlers arrived in the mid-1830s from New York, England, and Ireland. One of the first settlers was John Weston, who settled near present-day Thiensville in 1837 and served as the first postmaster of the Town of Mequon. The first Germans arrived in 1839, and in the 1840s Germans became the largest ethnic group in Thiensville, the Town of Mequon, and Ozaukee County.

Joachim Heinrich Thien moved to the area in 1842 from Oldenburg, Prussia, and helped design a plan for the settlement that would become Thiensville. A year later he employed a group of Native American laborers to construct a dam and a canal on the Milwaukee River. He then built a sawmill and a store. Thien hosted the first town meeting for the Town of Mequon in 1846, and in 1857 he established the volunteer fire department and served as its first captain.

Thien was a freethinker, as were many of the early German settlers. The influence of the freethinker societies kept formal churches out of the village until 1919, when St. Cecilia Catholic Church was built.

Thiensville grew in part because of its location on the Chicago, Milwaukee & St. Paul Railway, which was constructed in the early 1870s. In the late 19th and early 20th centuries, Thiensville was one of the most concentrated communities in the Town of Mequon. While most of Mequon was quite rural, Theinsville functioned as a downtown area with stores, mills, and professional services. The Village of Theinsville incorporated in 1910 with a population of 289.

In 1945, eighty German prisoners of war from Camp Fredonia in Little Kohler, Wisconsin were contracted to work at the Herbert A. Nieman Canning Company in the village to make up for the loss of labor due to local men fighting in World War II. German prisoners from Camp Rockfield in Rockfield, Wisconsin, (located in present-day Germantown) also worked at the Fromm Bros., Nieman & Co. Fox Ranch in northern Mequon.

In the 20th century, Mequon and the village of Theinsville developed a close relationship, with a shared school district, chamber of commerce, and library. The communities merged their fire and emergency medical response services to form the Southern Ozaukee Fire and Emergency Medical Services Department on January 1, 2023.

== Geography ==
According to the United States Census Bureau, the village has a total area of 1.10 square miles (2.85 km^{2}), of which 1.09 square miles (2.82 km^{2}) is land and 0.01 square miles (0.03 km^{2}) is water.

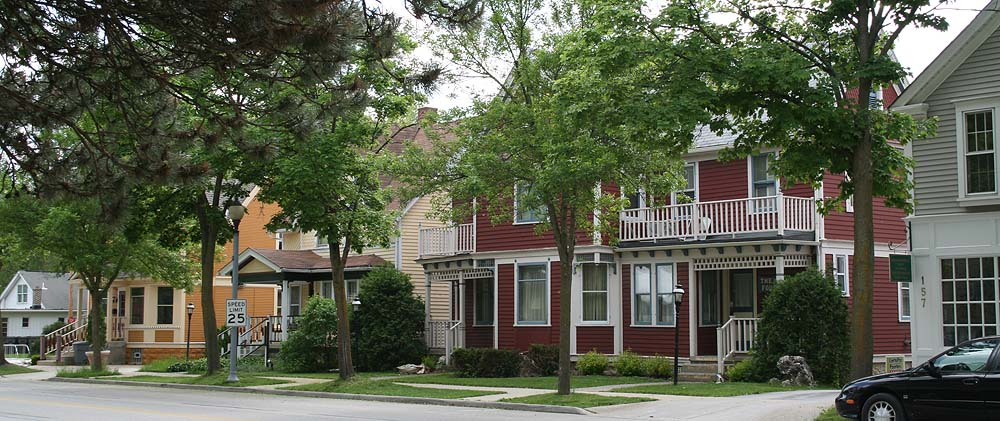
Many of the houses in Thiensville's Green Bay Road Historic District date to the 1890s and early 1900s.

The Village of Thiensville is an enclave, surrounded by the City of Mequon on all sides. The village is located on the northern and western banks of a bend in the Milwaukee River. Pigeon Creek also flows through downtown Thiensville into the river, with the confluence near the old village hall at the intersection of Main Street and Green Bay Road. There is a dam on the Milwaukee River, upstream of the confluence of the river and the creek.

The village is located in the Southeastern Wisconsin glacial till plains that were created by the Wisconsin glaciation during the most recent ice age. The village is south of the Devonian Thiensville formation, a large limestone deposit lying mostly below the soil with the exception of an exposed rock face at the Cedarburg Road cut in northern Mequon. The Wisconsin Department of Natural Resources considers the eastern part of Thiensville to be in the Central Lake Michigan Coastal ecological landscape, while the western part of the village is in the Southern Lake Michigan Coastal ecological landscape. Before white settlers arrived in the area, the area was an upland forest dominated by American beech and sugar maple trees. While some areas of Mequon have remained undeveloped, most of Thiensville has been developed and little-to-none of the old growth forest remains.

The region struggles with many invasive species, including the emerald ash borer, common carp, reed canary grass, the common reed, purple loosestrife, garlic mustard, Eurasian buckthorns, and honeysuckles.

== Demographics ==
Historical population
Census	Pop.	Note	%±
1920	334		—
1930	500		49.7%
1940	500		0.0%
1950	897		79.4%
1960	2,507		179.5%
1970	3,182		26.9%
1980	3,341		5.0%
1990	3,301		−1.2%
2000	3,254		−1.4%
2010	3,235		−0.6%
2020	3,290		1.7%
U.S. Decennial Census

=== 2010 census ===
As of the census of 2010, there were 3,235 people, 1,532 households, and 865 families living in the village. The population density was 2,967.9 inhabitants per square mile (1,145.9/km^{2}). There were 1,644 housing units at an average density of 1,508.3 per square mile (582.4/km^{2}). The racial makeup of the village was 93.3% White, 1.7% African American, 0.4% Native American, 2.1% Asian, 0.5% from other races, and 1.9% from two or more races. Hispanic or Latino of any race were 2.8% of the population.

There were 1,532 households, of which 24.5% had children under the age of 18 living with them, 45.6% were married couples living together, 7.7% had a female householder with no husband present, 3.2% had a male householder with no wife present, and 43.5% were non-families. 38.5% of all households were made up of individuals, and 17.6% had someone living alone who was 65 years of age or older. The average household size was 2.11 and the average family size was 2.82.

The median age in the village was 46.3 years. 20.8% of residents were under the age of 18; 5.6% were between the ages of 18 and 24; 21.5% were from 25 to 44; 31% were from 45 to 64; and 21% were 65 years of age or older. The gender makeup of the village was 45.8% male and 54.2% female.

=== 2000 census ===
As of the census of 2000, there were 3,254 people, 1,503 households, and 933 families living in the village. The population density was 2,964.7 people per square mile (1,142.2/km^{2}). There were 1,570 housing units at an average density of 1,430.4 per square mile (551.1/km^{2}). The racial makeup of the village was 96.56% White, 0.74% African American, 0.06% Native American, 1.26% Asian, 0.18% from other races, and 1.20% from two or more races. Hispanic or Latino of any race were 1.04% of the population.

There were 1,503 households, out of which 25.6% had children under the age of 18 living with them, 50.7% were married couples living together, 9.0% had a female householder with no husband present, and 37.9% were non-families. 33.3% of all households were made up of individuals, and 14.8% had someone living alone who was 65 years of age or older. The average household size was 2.17 and the average family size was 2.77.

In the village, the population was spread out, with 20.7% under the age of 18, 5.0% from 18 to 24, 27.8% from 25 to 44, 25.9% from 45 to 64, and 20.6% who were 65 years of age or older. The median age was 43 years. For every 100 females, there were 86.6 males. For every 100 females age 18 and over, there were 81.2 males.

The median income for a household in the village was $55,962, and the median income for a family was $69,286. Males had a median income of $46,088 versus $29,500 for females. The per capita income for the village was $30,748. About 1.9% of families and 2.7% of the population were below the poverty line, including 2.1% of those under age 18 and 2.1% of those age 65 or over.

== Arts and culture ==
=== Events ===
Events include a Memorial Day parade, "Fun Before the Fourth", and a public Christmas Tree lighting. The village also hosts a farmers market in Village Park (299 Elm St.) every Tuesday from June through October, 9 a.m. to 3:00 p.m.

The Lions Club hosts an annual Lionfest, with a softball tournament, bingo, live entertainment, carnival rides, a chicken dinner, and a car show.

The Best "Dam" Blues Fest is a two-day blues festival.

=== Library ===
The Frank L. Weyenberg Library is a public library serving Mequon and Thiensville. It is a member of the Monarch Library System, comprising thirty-one libraries in Ozaukee, Sheboygan, Washington, and Dodge counties. In 2018, the library made 307,796 loans to patrons.

=== Religion ===
Many of Thiensville's founders were German immigrants who were members of freethinker societies. They actively worked to keep organized churches out of the community, and succeeded for the first eight decades of the village's existence. When St. Cecilia Catholic Church and School was built in 1919, it was the first church in the village. St. Cecilia merged with St. James Catholic Church of Mequon in 1984 to form Lumen Christi Catholic Church and School. Services were held in Thiensville until 2019, when a new, larger facility was completed in nearby Mequon.

As of 2020, Grace Lutheran Church, which is affiliated with the Evangelical Lutheran Church in America and Christ Alone Evangelical Lutheran Church's North Campus, which is affiliated with the Wisconsin Evangelical Lutheran Synod, are located in the village. Christ Alone also operates a parochial school serving students from kindergarten through eighth grade in the village.

== Parks and recreation ==
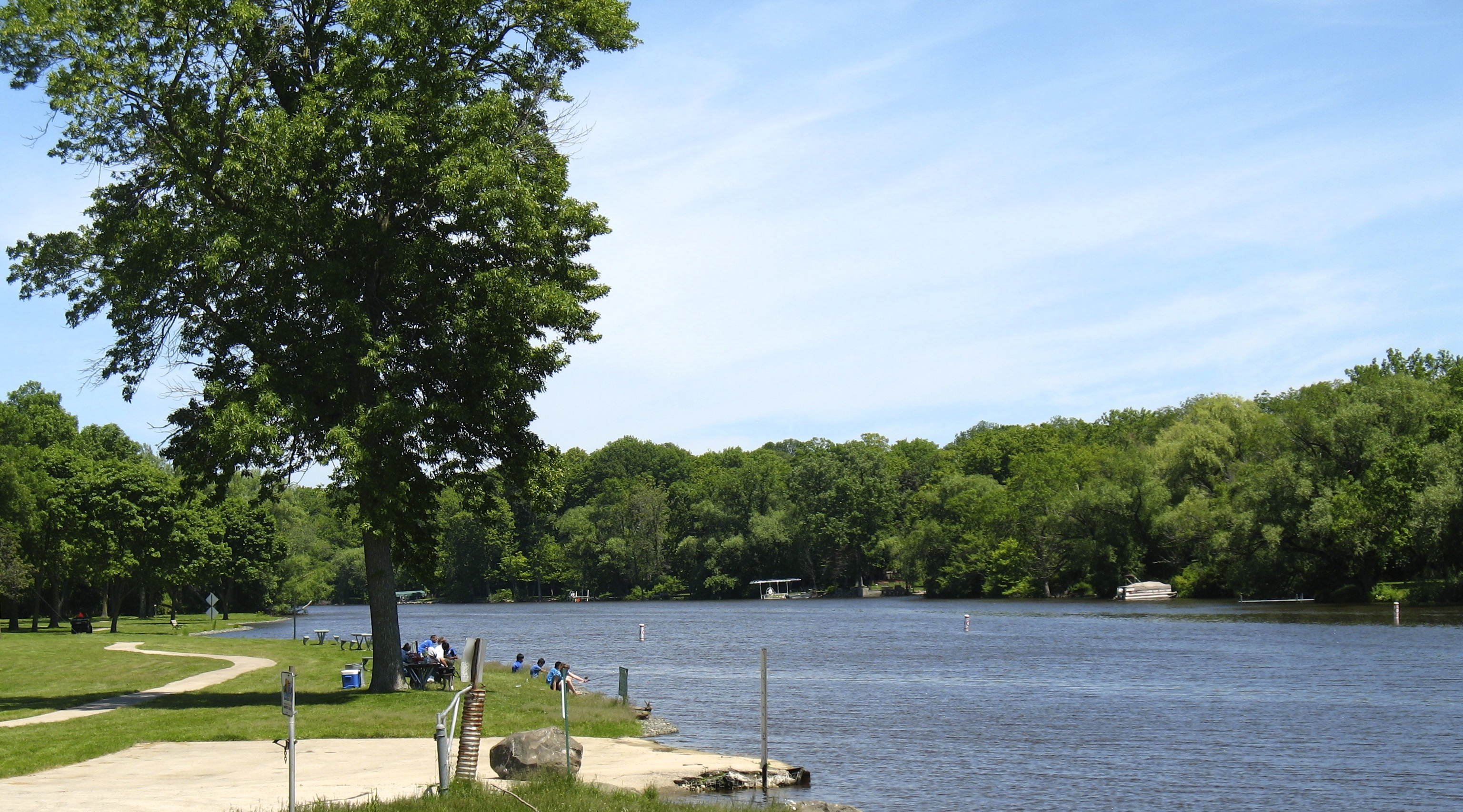
Village Park on the Milwaukee River

Parks include Molyneux Park, Village Park, and a pedestrian riverwalk.

The Ozaukee Interurban Trail runs through the city.

== Government ==
Thiensville is organized as a village governed by an elected board of trustees, comprising a village president and six trustees, all of whom are elected for three-year terms. The current president is John R. Rosing, a Thiensville-Mequon Rotary Club for over 30 years who was elected president in April 2024. The board meets on the third Monday of each month at 6 p.m. in the Thiensville Village Hall. Since 1984, the village's day-to-day operations have been managed by a full-time city administrator.

As part of Wisconsin's 6th congressional district, Thiensville is represented by Glenn Grothman (R) in the United States House of Representatives, and by Ron Johnson (R) and Tammy Baldwin (D) in the United States Senate. Dan Knodl (R) represents Thiensville in the Wisconsin State Senate, and Deb Andraca (D) represents Thiensville in the Wisconsin State Assembly.

After the 2024 redistricting act, Dan Knodl no longer resides in the 8th Senate district and announced he would seek election in the 24th Assembly district instead. Jodi Habush Sinykin has announced her candidacy for the 8th Senate district.

From	To	Village President
1910	1912	John F. Gierach
1912	1917	John E. Mueller
1917	1920	Charles A. Maas
1920	1922	Charles Friedrich
1922	1927	Charles A. Maas
1927	1935	Julius W. Schaefer
1935	1945	Dr. Alfred H. Carthaus
1945	1955	Theodore O. Liebscher
1955	1959	Harold H. Roethel
1959	1961	Edward Langley
1961	1967	Theodore O. Liebscher
1967	1968	William T. Flynn
1968	1971	Richard R. Sitman
1971	1977	Ned A. Kellner
1977	1987	Robert C. Warber
1987	1987	William C. Roselle
1987	1989	Donald A. Molyneux
1989	1991	John V. Kitzke
1991	1995	Roy Wetzel
1995	2006	Donald A. Molyneux
2006	2012	Karl V. Hertz
2012	2024	Van Mobley
2024	present	John R. Rosing

== Education ==
Thiensville's public schools are operated by the Mequon-Thiensville School District. The villages students attend two of the district's three elementary schools, serving grades kindergarten through fifth grade. Students in northern and eastern Thiensville attend Oriole Lane Elementary, while students from southwestern Thiensville attend Wilson Elementary. All students from Thiensville attend Steffen Middle School for sixth through eighth grades and Homestead High School for grades nine through twelve.

Christ Alone Evangelical Lutheran Church also operates a parochial school in Thiensville for students from kindergarten through eight grade.

== Infrastructure ==
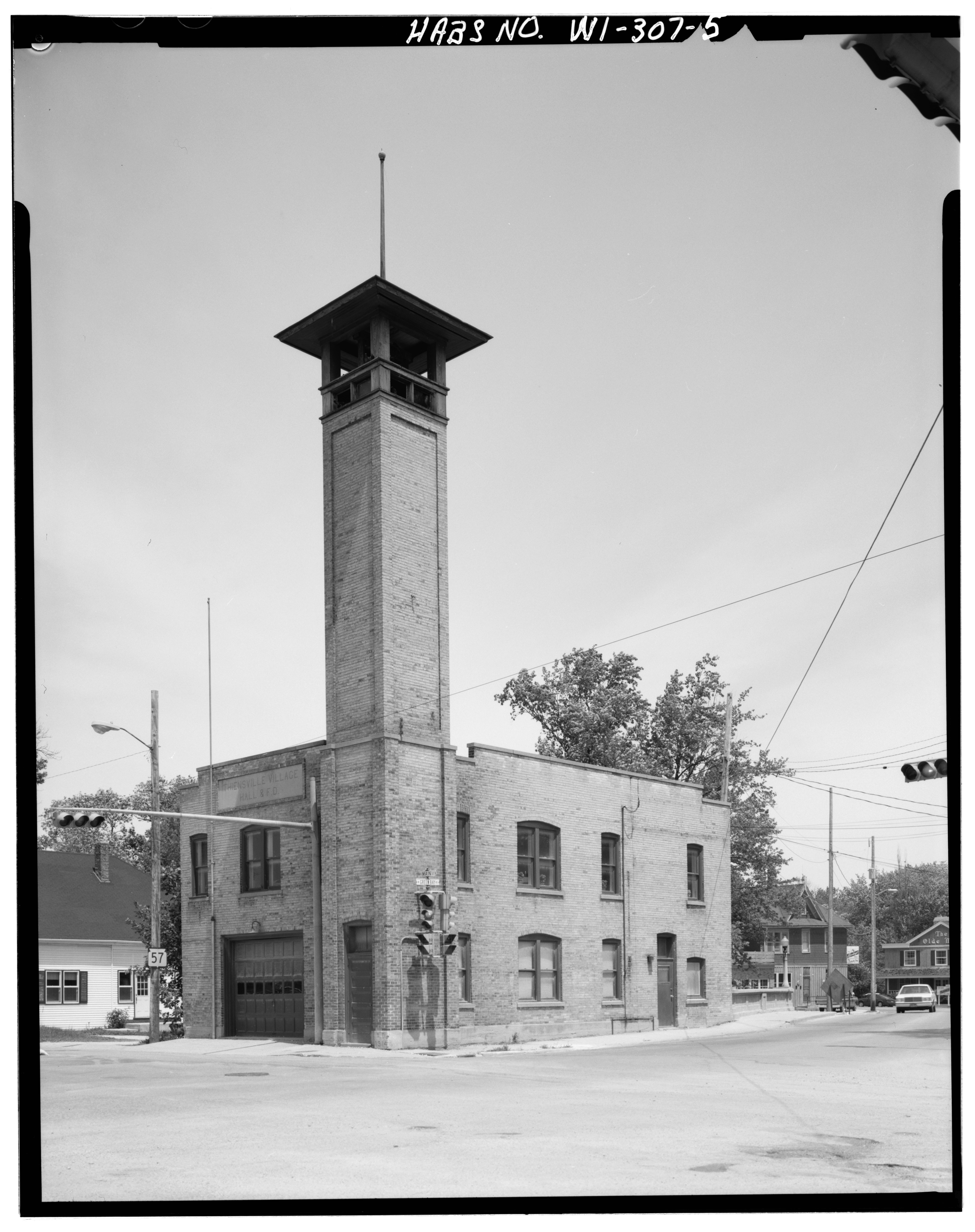
The William F. Rausch Fire Museum is located in the former Village Hall and Fire Station, built in 1914

=== Transportation ===
Ozaukee County Transit Services' Shared Ride Taxi operate within the county and makes connections to Washington County Transit.

The Wisconsin Central Ltd. railroad, a subsidiary of the Canadian National Railway, operates a freight rail line parallel to the Ozaukee Interurban Trail in the village.

=== Emergency services ===
Thiensville's volunteer fire department was organized in 1857 by village founder Joachim Heinrich Thien. Mequon and Thiensville fire departments merged in 2023, forming the Southern Ozaukee Fire and Emergency Medical Services Department. They operate from two stations in Mequon and one station in Thiensville, and maintain the William F. Rausch Fire Museum in the 1914 Fire Department and Village Hall.

Historically, the village had a part-time village constable or village marshal. Thiensville's full-time police department was established in 1967, and employs eight full-time sworn officers, one civilian administrator, and fourteen reserve officers.

== Notable people ==
- Glenn Grothman, United States Congressman serving Wisconsin's 6th congressional district.
- William Carbys Zimmerman, architect, was born in Thiensville.

== See also ==
- List of villages in Wisconsin
