= William F. Jahn Farmstead =

- U.S. National Register of Historic Places
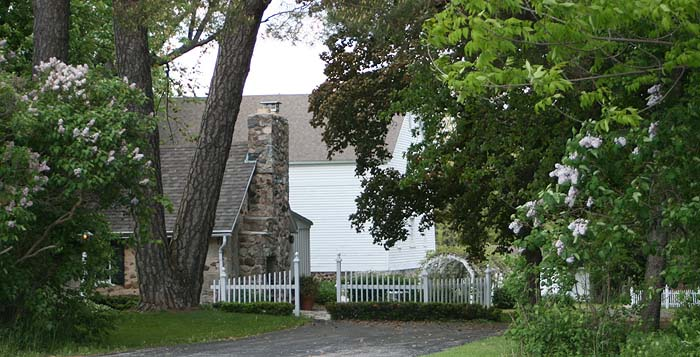
- William F. Jahn Farmstead

- Location within Wisconsin Location within the United States
- Location: 12112-12116 Wauwatosa Rd. Mequon, Wisconsin
- Coordinates: 43°14′18″N 88°0′11″W
- Area: 3 acres (1.2 ha)
- Built: 1855
- Architectural style: Greek Revival
- NRHP reference No.: 00000978
- Added to NRHP: August 10, 2000

The William F. Jahn Farmstead is located in Mequon, Wisconsin, United States. The farmstead includes a farmhouse, two barns, a summer kitchen, and two outbuildings. While the farmstead is not longer used for agriculture, portions have been converted to facilitate bed and breakfast lodging.

== History ==
Jahn was a German immigrant, arriving with his family at Mequon from Saxony in 1844 at the age of 12. He became a surveyor, Superintendent of Schools for the city, a farmer, and a prominent local politician. The farm was a successful diversified operation, by 1880 it had grown to 100 acres with dairy cows, pigs, and chickens, and grew wheat, corn, and oats.

The farmstead is significant as a relatively intact and well-preserved example of a Greek Revival farmhouse in Mequon. The property was added to the National Register of Historic Places in 2000.
