= Concordia Mill =

- U.S. National Register of Historic Places
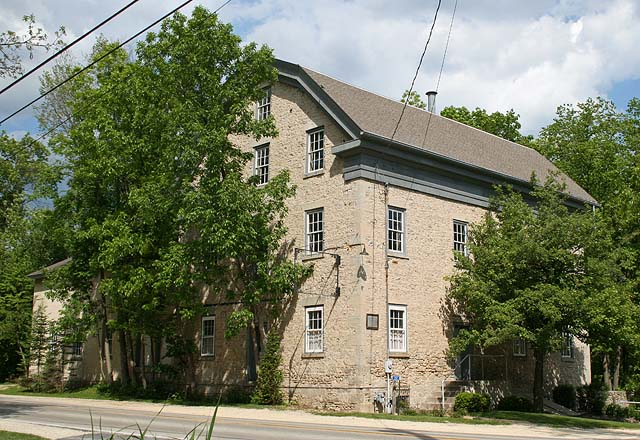
- Concordia Mill

- Location within Wisconsin
- Location: 252 Green Bay Rd. Hamilton, Ozaukee County, Wisconsin
- Coordinates: 43.2848°N 87.97037°W
- Built: 1853
- Architectural style: Greek Revival
- NRHP reference No.: 74000116
- Added to NRHP: April 26, 1974

The Concordia Mill is a former gristmill on Cedar Creek located in Hamilton, Wisconsin, United States. The limestone mill was built in 1853 by Edward H. Janssen and his brother, Theodore, along with a Mr. Gaitsch with locally quarried limestone. In 1881, the mill's dam washed out during heavy spring flooding and was rebuilt sometime later. The mill operated until World War II when it was converted into a distillery that operated for several years. On April 26, 1974, it was added to the National Register of Historic Places, and the surrounding area, known as the Hamilton Historic District was added to the NRHP two years later.

== See also ==
Mills on Cedar Creek
Mill Name	Year built	Products Produced	Notes
Concordia Mill	1853	Grain	Dam washed out and removed 1996
Excelsior Mill, later Cedarburg Wire and Nail Factory	1871	Grain, lumber, drawn steel, hydroelectricity	
Columbia Mill	1843	Grain	Demolished
Cedarburg Mill	1844	Grain	Rebuilt 1855 with current stone structure
Hilgen and Wittenberg Woolen Mill	1864	Textiles	
