= Main Street Historic District (Thiensville, Wisconsin) =

Historic district in Wisconsin, United States

- U.S. National Register of Historic Places
- U.S. Historic district
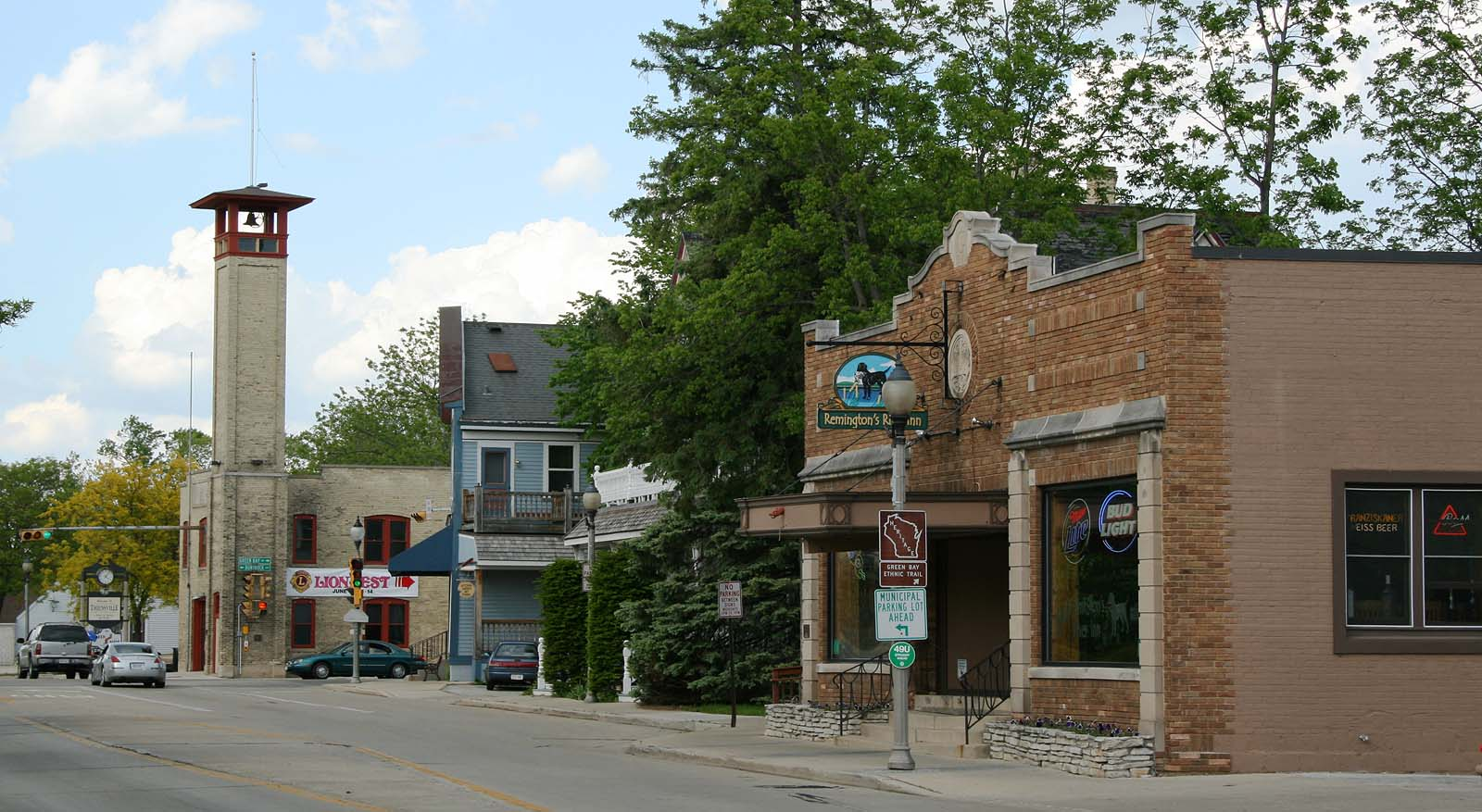
- A portion of the district.

- Location within Wisconsin
- Location: Thiensville, Wisconsin
- Coordinates: 43.228808°N 87.984227°W
- NRHP reference No.: 04001279
- Added to NRHP: November 26, 2004

The Main Street Historic District was added to the National Register of Historic Places in 2004.

== History ==
The area that would become Main Street was originally a plank road designed for travelers on horses. With the arrival of the Wisconsin Central Railroad in 1871, a series of new businesses sprung up and the area began transitioning into Thiensville's new commercial center. Previously, the center of Thiensville's commercial activity was located to the east in what is now the Green Bay Road Historic District. Business continued to grow on Main Street with the introduction of an interurban in 1907. In 1915, the street was paved to accommodate automobiles and several automobile-related business opened up in response.
