= Cedarburg Mill =

Gristmill in Cedarburg, Wisconsin

- U.S. National Register of Historic Places
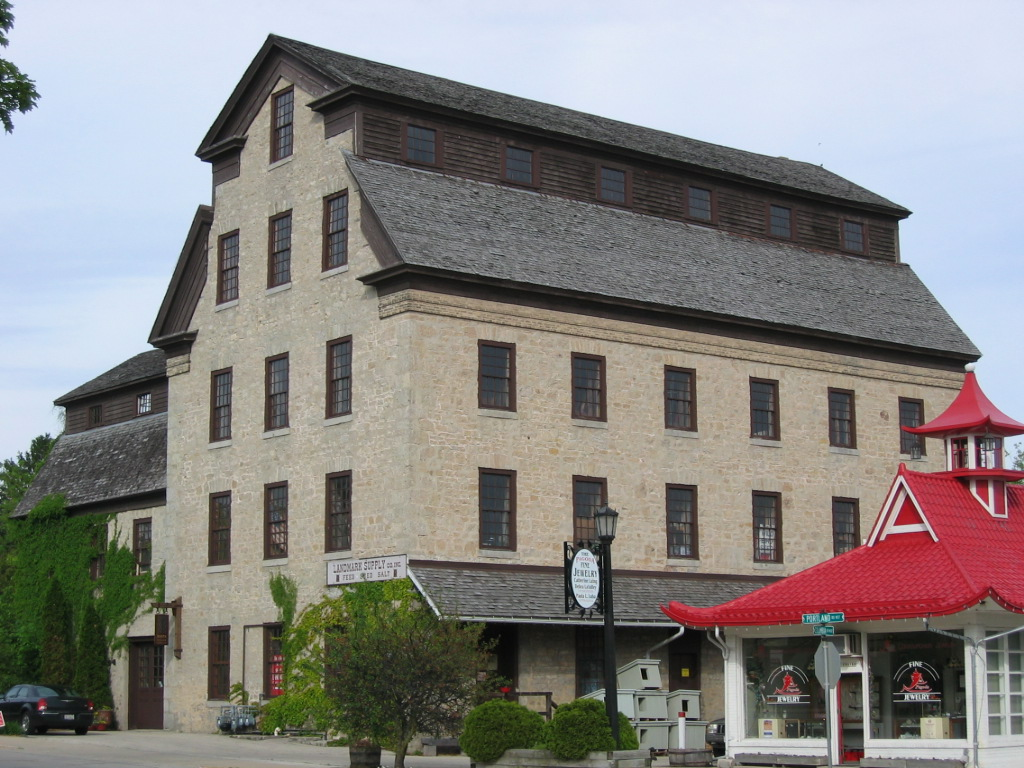
- Cedarburg Mill

- Location within Wisconsin
- Location: N70 W6340 Bridge Road or 215 E. Columbia Ave. Cedarburg, Wisconsin
- Coordinates: 43°17′48″N 87°59′10″W
- Built: 1855
- Architect: Burchard Weber
- Architectural style: Vernacular Greek Revival
- NRHP reference No.: 74000115
- Added to NRHP: May 8, 1974

The Cedarburg Mill is a former gristmill in Cedarburg, Wisconsin that is listed on the U.S. National Register of Historic Places. Located the on Cedar Creek, the building was commissioned in 1855 by Frederick Hilgen and William Schroeder to replace a smaller wooden mill from the 1840s. It was designed and built by Burchard Weber. At the time of its construction, the five-story structure was the tallest building in Cedarburg.

== History ==
In 1844, Frederick Hilgen and William Schroeder built a wooden gristmill on the west bank of Cedar Creek in what would become the City of Cedarburg. By the 1850s, the millers needed a new structure to expand their business, and they employed Burchard Weber to design and build a new, stone mill. The east wing of the building was built first, followed by the main building, which employed a large earthen ramp to move locally quarried stone to higher levels. In 1855, Weber completed the five-story building, which cost $22,000. The new mill could produce 120 barrels of flour each day, which Hilgen and Schroeder sold at a store across the street. Other 19th century mills on Cedar Creek included the 1864 Hilgen and Wittenburg Woolen Mill and the 1871 Excelsior Mill.

During Wisconsin's "Great Indian Scare" of September 1862, the mill was used as a makeshift fortress by some residents in response to rumors of a Native American uprising in the state. 30,000 men were out of state, serving in the American Civil War, and would not be able to respond to such an uprising inflating residents fears. The rumors were ultimately false, however the rumor caused mass hysteria in state's population.

In 1881, Cedar Creek experienced severe spring flooding, and the Cedarburg Mill's dam was the only dam to survive the year. In 1882, John Grundke bought the building. In 1901, Grundke sold the mill to Christian, Louis, and William Ruck. In 1913, Christian's son Louis Ruck bought out the other family members and became the sole proprietor. The milldam and pond still bear the Ruck name. In January, 1930, Louis Ruck sold the mill to the Cedarburg Supply Company, which converted the structure from hydropower to electric power and still owns the property, though it is now known as Landmark Supply Company. In 1974, the mill building was added to the National Register of Historic Places.

== Pollution and EPA Superfund site ==
From the 1950s through the early 1970s, the City of Cedarburg's sewers carried waste oil containing PCBs from the local Mercury Marine plant to the Cedarburg Mill's millpond. The contamination also spread downstream to Cedar Creek's confluence with the Milwaukee River. Cedar Creek became an EPA Superfund clean-up site in 1994, and the millpond was dredged to remove contaminated sediments. In 2016, additional PCB remediation was completed in the mill race.

== See also ==
Mills on Cedar Creek
Mill Name	Year built	Products Produced	Notes
Concordia Mill	1853	Grain	Dam washed out and removed 1996
Excelsior Mill, later Cedarburg Wire and Nail Factory	1871	Grain, lumber, drawn steel, hydroelectricity	
Columbia Mill	1843	Grain	Demolished
Cedarburg Mill	1844	Grain	Rebuilt 1855 with current stone structure
Hilgen and Wittenberg Woolen Mill	1864	Textiles	
