= Jacob Voigt House =

Historic house in Wisconsin, United States

- U.S. National Register of Historic Places
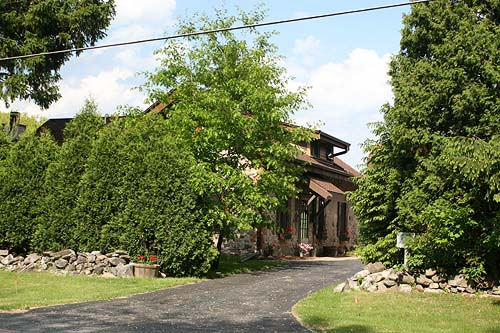
- Jacob Voigt House

- Location within Wisconsin
- Location: 11550 N. Wauwatosa Rd. Mequon, Wisconsin
- Coordinates: 43.228271°N 88.003277°W
- Built: 1855
- NRHP reference No.: 00001164
- Added to NRHP: September 22, 2000

The Jacob Voigt House is a historic farm located in Mequon, Wisconsin, United States. It was added to the National Register of Historic Places in 2000.

After the Black Hawk War in 1832, Europeans began to settle around Mequon. The first settlers were mostly Yankees, but by 1839 Germans began to join them. Jacob and Johanna Voigt were German immigrants who bought part of this farm by 1860. Jacob was a tailor, but they also raised wheat, oats, and hay on their 10 acres, and sold butter from their two cows. The Voigt family had the farm until the 1920s, when it was divided up.

The main block of the house was built around 1855. It is 1.5 stories with well-constructed walls of randomly-coursed fieldstone, with corner quoins of limestone. Arches above the windows are limestone or brick. The roof is rather low-pitched, with a shed-roofed dormer - a more modern design than the original roof. In the living room is a large stone oven which may be original to the house.

Also remaining is a very intact gambrel-roofed bank barn with vertical wood siding built around 1880.

The NRHP considers the Voigt farmstead significant because the house is a fine example of stone construction and the farm represents German settlement in the area.
