= Columbia Historic District (Cedarburg, Wisconsin) =

Historic district in Cedarburg, Wisconsin

- U.S. National Register of Historic Places
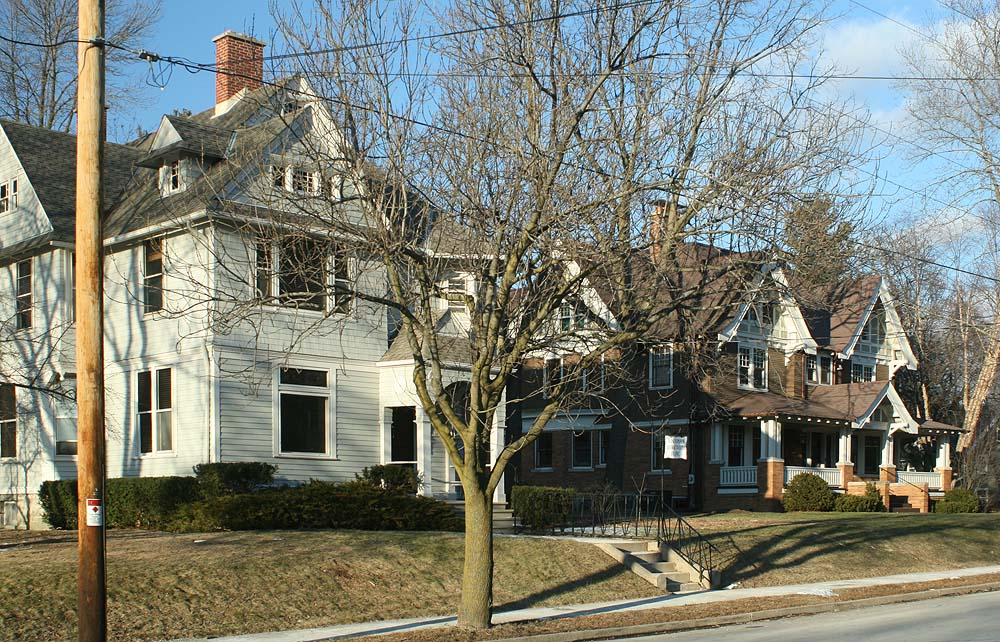
- Houses in the district

- Location within Wisconsin Location within the United States
- Location: Roughly bounded by Cedar Cr., Highland Dr. and Bridge Rd., Cedarburg, Wisconsin
- Coordinates: 43.298°N 87.986°W
- Area: 52 acres (21 ha)
- Architectural style: Bungalow/craftsman, Greek Revival, Queen Anne
- NRHP reference No.: 91001980
- Added to NRHP: January 22, 1992

The Columbia Historic District is a neighborhood in Cedarburg, Wisconsin, that is listed on the National Register of Historic Places. At the time the district was listed on the register, its contributing properties included 128 historic homes, one church, and eighty-seven historic outbuildings, including garages and barns, all constructed between 1844 and 1938. The district also contained several dozen buildings that do not contribute to the historic district, including modern homes from the post-war era as well as modern garages and other additions to historic properties.

== History ==
In 1842, a family of Old Lutheran German immigrants named Groth settled in the Cedarburg area and constructed a cabin on the eastern bank of Cedar Creek. Although the Groth cabin not longer exists, it was the first building in the area of the Columbia Historic District. Between 1843 and 1846, Dr. Frederick A. Luening built the Columbia Mill on Cedar Creek as well as a dam to power his gristmill. It was the first mill on Cedar Creek, and its dam flooded nearby properties, causing a dispute with neighboring settlers. Luening had to tear down the original structure and move his mill further east. In 1844, Frederick Hilgen and William Schroeder built the Cedarburg Mill on the western bank of Cedar Creek, directly west of the present-day historic district. Cedarburg's town center grew along Washington Avenue, closer to Hilgen and Schroeder's mill, so Columbia Road was cut to facilitate transportation between the community's center and the Columbia Mill, and houses began to spring up along the road.

The neighborhood was primarily a residential area. While some wealthier Cedarburg merchants built several large houses along Columbia Road close to downtown Cedarburg, most of the houses along Columbia Road and the surrounding streets were occupied by German working-class families in the 19th and early 20th centuries. The oldest homes were built on large lots in a vernacular style of locally quarried limestone. As time went on, the large lots were subdivided to accommodate the families of Cedarburg's mill workers and other factory workers settled in the area.

Other buildings in the district include the limestone Trinity Evangelical Lutheran Church, constructed in 1891; the Gleitzmann Cooperage, constructed in the mid-1860s to manufacture flour barrels for the local gristmills; and the Columbia Mill's now-demolished factory store, constructed in 1874 and destroyed in a fire in 1876.

While the Columbia Mill was a major employer in the community's early history, and could produce eighty barrels of flour per day in the 19th century the business was frequently sold from one entrepreneur to another. Between 1851 and 1900, the mill changed hands nine times, including being auctioned at sheriff's sales in 1851 and 1880. In the 1890s, production shifted from flour to animal feed, and in 1926 the Cedarburg Wire and Nail Factory—located east of the mill and the historic district—purchased the mill solely to use its dam for water power. During the Great Depression, Gerhard and Elmer Weber began operating a feed mill in the Columbia Mill, which the Weber family continued until sometime after 1965, when the mill was demolished, although the dam and millrace remain intact.

== Architecture ==
The district's dominant architectural styles are Queen Anne Revival, bungalow, Colonial Revival, and English Cottage, although some houses do not have enough detail to be considered to have a distinct style. Queen Anne Revival buildings account for 23% of contributing properties to the historic district and bungalows account for 10%. Many houses are of vernacular construction, making use of locally quarried Lannon stone, Cream City brick, and Wisconsin timber.

Some of the district's oldest homes are vernacular Greek Revival and Italianate structures from the 1860s, including the Gleitzmann Cooperage and the 1869 home of Ernst Hilgen, co-owner of the Columbia Mill and son of one of Cedarburg's founding millers. Other 19th-century structures include wood-frame houses and cream brick houses. Many wooden structures are in a vernacular Queen Anne Revival style, though some turn-of-the-century homes blend characteristics of the Queen Anne Revival and American Craftsman styles. The district's houses are particularly characterized by decorative soffits and string courses on the houses' front gables, in line with the lintels of the second-story windows.

The Highland Avenue Bridge is also located adjacent to the historic district, over the Columbia Mill's dam. Designed by local engineer Charles S. Whitney, the single-span arch bridge was constructed of in 1939 by the Public Works Administration, a New Deal program. The bridge's concrete structure is clad with a medieval revival stone facade, and pillars on the four abutment corners, are each crowned by a metal lantern. While not a contributing property to the historic district, the Wisconsin Department of Transportation identified it in 1986 as a structure worthy of historic preservation.
