= Green Bay Road Historic District (Thiensville, Wisconsin) =

Historic district in Wisconsin, United States

- U.S. National Register of Historic Places
- U.S. Historic district
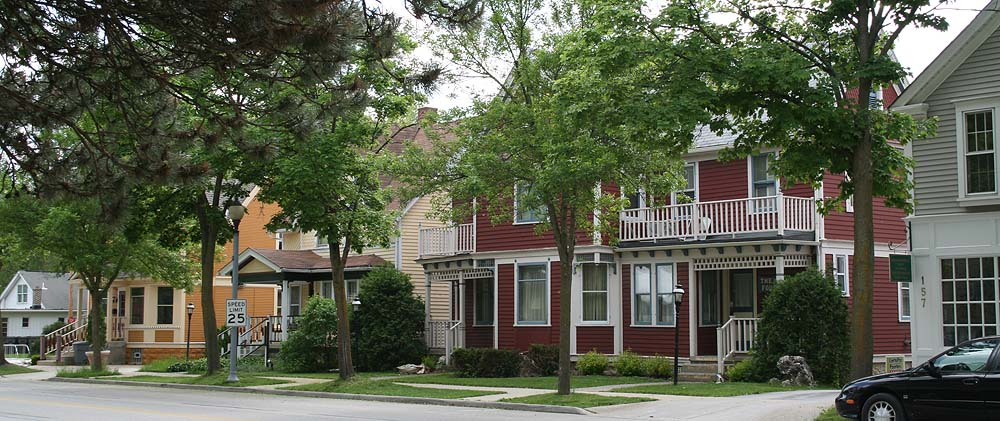
- A portion of the district.

- Location within Wisconsin
- Location: Thiensville, Wisconsin
- Coordinates: 43.231182°N 87.982537°W
- NRHP reference No.: 04001278
- Added to NRHP: November 26, 2004

The Green Bay Road Historic District is located in Thiensville, Wisconsin.

== History ==
Most of the buildings in the district were constructed between 1850 and 1900. The businesses in the area were largely designed to serve the needs of customers during the horse and buggy era. After the arrival of a railroad, an interurban and automobiles, the village's commercial center moved west. That area would become the Main Street Historic District. Additionally, a number of private homes were built in the district, most were designed in the Queen Anne architectural style.
