= Ulao Creek =

River in Wisconsin, United States of America

Coordinates: 43°15′45″N 87°56′38″W

Physical characteristics
- Source
  - location: South of Port Washington, Grafton, Ozaukee County, Wisconsin
- Mouth
  - location: Milwaukee River at Bonniwell Road, Mequon
- Length: 9.2 mi (14.8 km)

Basin features
- Progression: Milwaukee River

Ulao Creek is a 9.2-mile-long (14.8 km) tributary of the Milwaukee River in Ozaukee County, Wisconsin, United States. It begins in a swampy area south of Port Washington in the town of Grafton and flows south through Ulao. It roughly parallels Interstate 43 before crossing to the west of the freeway just south of Lakefield Road. The creek then flows to the southwest into Mequon, where it joins the Milwaukee River at Bonniwell Road.
