= Grafton, Wisconsin =

Village in Ozaukee County, Wisconsin

- Village
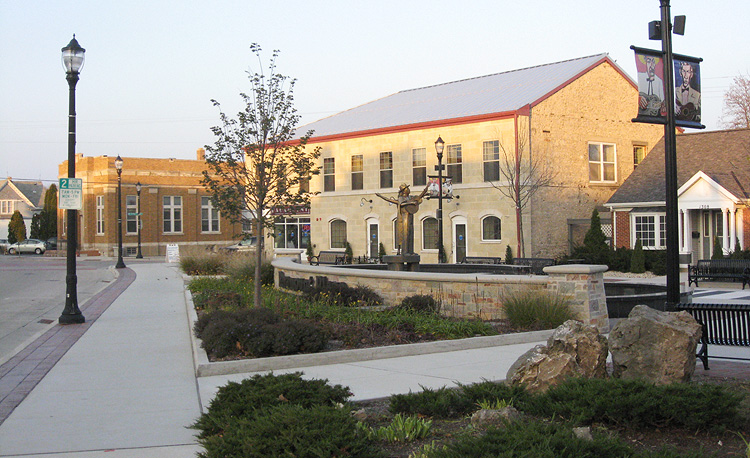
- Downtown Grafton, at the Paramount Plaza

- Location of Grafton in Ozaukee County, Wisconsin
- Coordinates: 43°19′9″N 87°55′54″W
- Country: United States
- State: Wisconsin
- County: Ozaukee
- Settled: 1839
- Incorporated: March 30, 1896; 130 years ago

Government
  - Village President: David Armstrong
  - Administrator: Tim Wellnitz
  - Clerk: Kaity Olsen
  - Village board: Trustees: Sarah Scarpace; Kevin Curtis; Danielle Autotte; Luke Spykstra; Russell MacRae; Scott Rishel

Area
  - Total: 5.15 sq mi (13.34 km^{2})
  - Land: 5.09 sq mi (13.18 km^{2})
  - Water: 0.062 sq mi (0.16 km^{2})
- Elevation: 709 ft (216 m)

Population (2020)
  - Total: 12,094
  - Estimate (2021): 12,298
  - Density: 2,300/sq mi (889/km^{2})
- Time zone: UTC-6 (Central (CST))
  - Summer (DST): UTC-5 (CDT)
- ZIP code: 53024
- Area code: 262
- FIPS code: 55-30025
- GNIS feature ID: 1583294
- Website: villageofgraftonwi.gov

Grafton is a village in Ozaukee County, Wisconsin, United States. Located approximately 20 miles (32 km) north of Milwaukee and in close proximity to Interstate 43, it is a suburban community in the Milwaukee metropolitan area. The village incorporated in 1896, and at the time of the 2020 census the population was 12,094.

Like many of Ozaukee County's cities and villages, the Village of Grafton has rural roots and began as a mill town. The German and Irish immigrants who settled in Grafton in the 1840s utilized the Milwaukee River as a source of hydropower for gristmills and woolen mills. Manufacturing grew and prospered in the village in the 20th century, including the Paramount Records studio and plant, which was in Grafton from 1929 to 1935. Paramount was one of the first and largest producers of blues and jazz records marketed to African-American consumers. Paramount's role in Grafton's history and Blues music history earned the village a spot on the historic Mississippi Blues Trail.

Grafton changed significantly during the period of post-World War II suburbanization. Even though the last woolen mill closed in 1980, the village experienced rapid population growth and the development of new commercial properties and housing subdivisions. The construction of Interstate 43 in the mid-1960s eased travel to neighboring communities. In the 21st century, Grafton is home to many big-box stores as well as an Aurora hospital.

== History ==
The first Europeans to visit the area were the Jesuit missionaries Claude-Jean Allouez and Claude Bablon, who visited a Native American village on the Milwaukee River near the future site of Grafton around 1670.

Timothy Wooden, who arrived in 1839 from the eastern United States, is considered Grafton's first permanent white resident. The majority of the early residents were immigrants from Germany and Ireland. In the early 1840s, the village was called Hamburg, because Jacob Eichler, one of the village founders, was an immigrant from Hamburg, Germany. A post office for "Hamburgh" was established in 1844.

The Wisconsin territorial legislature officially created the town of Grafton in 1846. The village of Grafton was officially incorporated from some of the town's land on March 30, 1896.

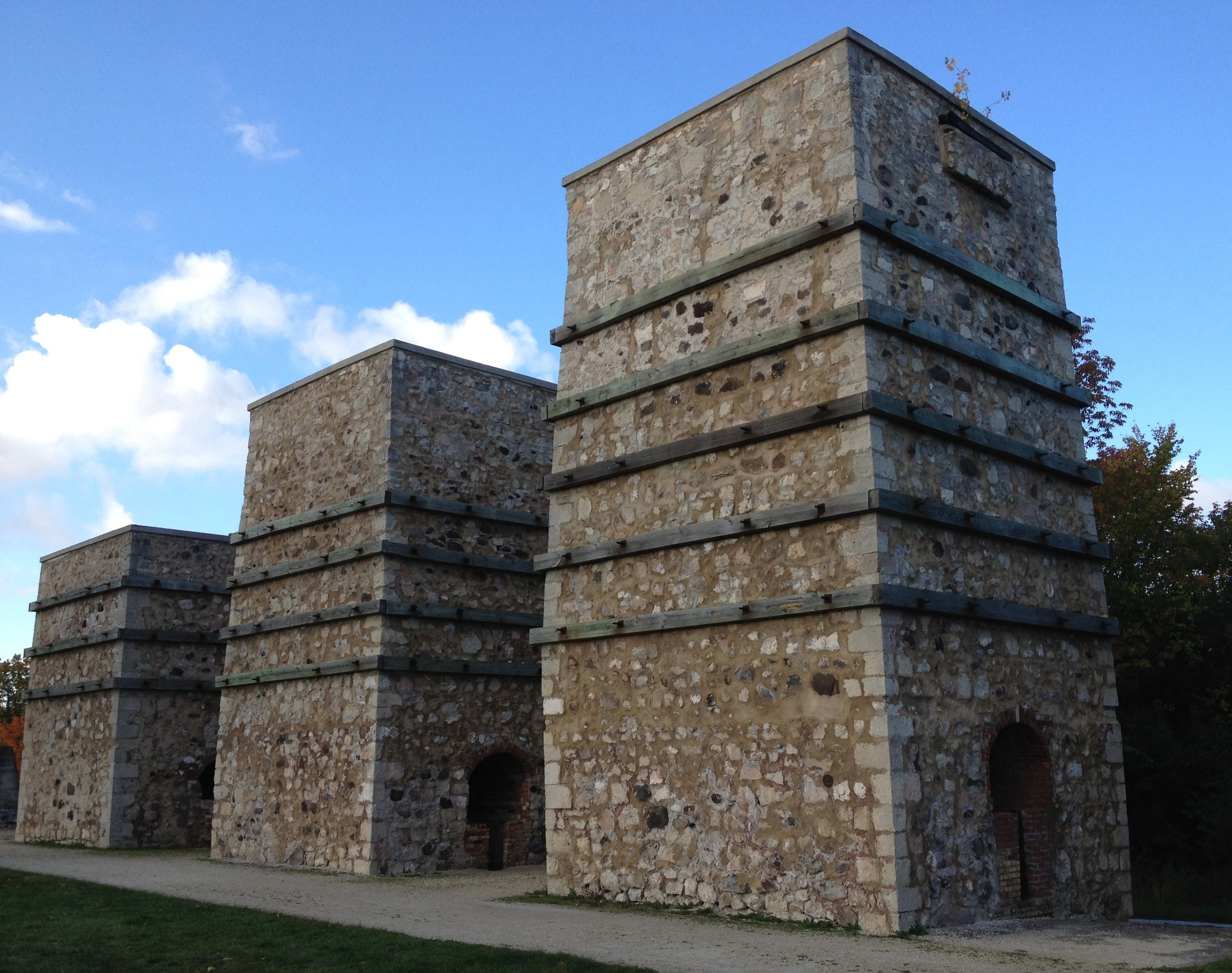
Of five original lime kilns of the Milwaukee Falls Lime Company, three remain.

The village's early settlers utilized the Milwaukee River as a source of power for milling. In 1846, a group farmers built the Grafton Flour Mill. In 1880, the owner of Cedarburg's woolen mill opened a mill in Grafton to make worsted yarn. At its height, Grafton's woolen mill employed 100 people.

Grafton was also the site of the Milwaukee Falls Lime Company, which quarried limestone in the village and operated lime kilns to manufacture slaked lime. The kilns are preserved in Grafton's Lime Kiln Park, on the west bank of the Milwaukee River. Lime production played an important part in the village economy until the 1920s.

In the early 20th century, the Wisconsin Chair Company of Port Washington operated a furniture factory in the village, which manufactured phonographs among other things. The company originally manufactured phonographs exclusively for Edison Records, but in 1917 it started its own Paramount Records subsidiary, which became famous for producing some of the first blues and jazz records, called race records because they were by African-American artists and were marketed to African-American consumers. It is estimated that a quarter of all race records released between 1922 and 1932 were on the Paramount label. Music was originally recorded in Chicago, until the Paramount headquarters and studio moved to the Grafton factory in 1929. Artists including Charley Patton, Son House, Willie Brown, and Louise Johnson journeyed from the American South to record in Grafton. The studio stopped recording music in 1932, due to the Great Depression, and Paramount Records closed in 1935 and the building was razed in 1938. Today, Grafton is one of the few sites on the Mississippi Blues Trail outside of the American South.

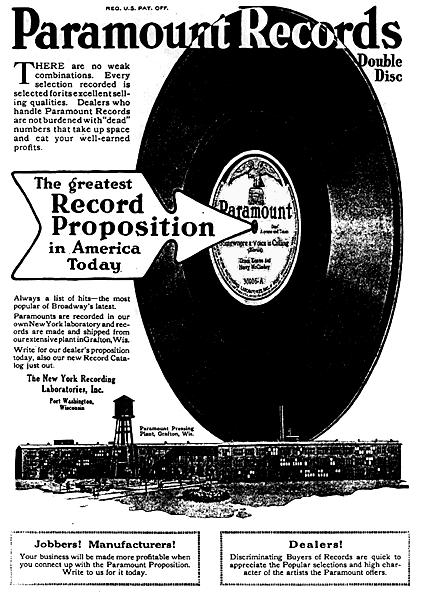
Paramount Records ad featuring an image of the facility in Grafton

In the late 1930s, a group of pro-Nazi German-Americans affiliated with the German American Bund purchased land on the Milwaukee River in the Town of Grafton. They ran a private camp called Camp Hindenburg and came into the village to march with Nazi flags and meet at the Grafton Hotel. The group hosted a speech by Nazi-supporter Fritz Julius Kuhn in 1939. The camp closed during World War II in 1941.

Grafton experienced significant population growth during the suburbanization that followed World War II. Between 1950 and 1980, the village population increased five-times over, from 1,489 to 8,381. As the population grew, the village annexed more farm land from the town of Grafton for residential subdivisions and commercial developments. The construction of Interstate 43 in the mid-1960s connected Grafton to other communities, such as Milwaukee and Sheboygan.

In 1988 and 1989, the village was the center of a controversy that gained national media attention. In 1987, the Grafton Organization for Library Donations began a campaign to construct a new library facility and announced that the individual or group that gave the largest donation would have right to choose the building's name. Local industrialists Benjamin and Theodore Grob gave $250,000 to the campaign on that condition that the facility be named the USS Liberty Memorial Public Library in honor of thirty-four U.S. citizens killed by Israel during the Six-Day War. Milwaukee-based Jewish organizations protested that the name was antisemitic; although Israel claimed that the attack on the USS Liberty was an accident—a claim confirmed by a U.S. congressional inquiry—some right-wing groups such as the USS Liberty Veterans Association and the Liberty Lobby used the incident as a political lightning rod to promote anti-Zionist and antisemitic positions. However, the Grob brothers claimed that their intentions were patriotic and they wanted to honor victims who had received little official recognition. Media outlets including the Chicago Tribune and The New York Times reported on the story and made public the Grob brothers' ties to right-wing groups, including the Liberty Lobby, and an investigation by the Milwaukee Journal also found that Benjamin Grob had given money to the Ku Klux Klan, including a $500 contribution to David Duke's 1988 presidential campaign. In spite of the controversy and protests in the community, village president James Grant dismissed the allegations and proceeded to dedicate the library in June 1989, marking the twenty-second anniversary of the USS Liberty incident. Sixty survivors of the Liberty attended the dedication ceremony.

In December 2020 a pharmacist at a local hospital was arrested for allegedly tampering with vials of COVID-19 vaccine.

== Geography ==
Grafton is located at 43°19′4″N 87°57′14″W (43.317904, −87.954113). According to the United States Census Bureau, the village has a total area of 5.10 square miles (13.21 km^{2}), of which 5.06 square miles (13.11 km^{2}) is land and 0.04 square miles (0.10 km^{2}) is water. The village is bordered by the City of Cedarburg and the Town of Cedarburg to the west and by the Town of Grafton to the north, east, and south.

The village is located in the Southeastern Wisconsin glacial till plains that were created by the Wisconsin glaciation during the most recent ice age. The soil in area is a mixture of well-draining material, loess, and loam, which all overlie a layer of glacial till. The village contains 40-foot high Silurian dolomite outcrops in Lime Kiln Park, which were used for quarrying in the 19th century and have since been used for geological studies.

The Milwaukee River flows south through downtown Grafton. Early industry utilized the river by constructing three dams for mechanical hydropower: one at the Grafton Flour Mill and Badger Worsted Mill, another at the Wisconsin Chair Company factory, and a third near the Milwaukee Falls Lime Company's lime kilns in present-day Lime Kiln Park. The chair factory and lime kiln dams have since been removed.

Before white settlers arrived in the area, the Grafton area was an upland forest dominated by American beech and sugar maple trees. There were also white cedars growing along the river. Much of the original forest was cleared to prepare the land for agriculture. The Bratt Woods, a nature preserve maintained by the Ozaukee Washington Land Trust on the eastern bank of the Milwaukee River, has old growth endemic trees and retains the character of the pre-settlement beech-maple forests.

As land development continues to reduce wild areas, wildlife is forced into closer proximity with human communities like Grafton. Large mammals, including white-tailed deer, coyotes, and red foxes can be seen within the village limits. Many birds, including great blue herons and wild turkeys are found in and around the village. The Bratt Woods nature preserve is a habitat for the American gromwell, a State-designated special concern plant species.

The region struggles with many invasive species, including the emerald ash borer, common carp, reed canary grass, the common reed, purple loosestrife, garlic mustard, Eurasian buckthorns, and honeysuckles.

== Demographics ==
Historical population
Census	Pop.	Note	%±
1880	415		—
1890	434		4.6%
1900	478		10.1%
1910	818		71.1%
1920	898		9.8%
1930	1,065		18.6%
1940	1,150		8.0%
1950	1,489		29.5%
1960	3,748		151.7%
1970	5,998		60.0%
1980	8,381		39.7%
1990	9,340		11.4%
2000	10,312		10.4%
2010	11,459		11.1%
2020	12,094		5.5%
U.S. Decennial Census

=== 2020 census ===
As of the 2020 census, Grafton had a population of 12,094. The median age was 43.7 years. 20.7% of residents were under the age of 18 and 21.6% of residents were 65 years of age or older. For every 100 females there were 92.6 males, and for every 100 females age 18 and over there were 88.9 males age 18 and over.

98.3% of residents lived in urban areas, while 1.7% lived in rural areas.

There were 5,415 households in Grafton, of which 25.3% had children under the age of 18 living in them. Of all households, 49.9% were married-couple households, 16.7% were households with a male householder and no spouse or partner present, and 28.5% were households with a female householder and no spouse or partner present. About 34.1% of all households were made up of individuals and 16.9% had someone living alone who was 65 years of age or older.

There were 5,632 housing units, of which 3.9% were vacant. The homeowner vacancy rate was 0.3% and the rental vacancy rate was 5.5%.

Racial composition as of the 2020 census
Race	Number	Percent
White	10,924	90.3%
Black or African American	128	1.1%
American Indian and Alaska Native	30	0.2%
Asian	389	3.2%
Native Hawaiian and Other Pacific Islander	5	0.0%
Some other race	94	0.8%
Two or more races	524	4.3%
Hispanic or Latino (of any race)	372	3.1%

=== 2010 census ===
As of the census of 2010, there were 11,459 people, 4,863 households, and 3,192 families residing in the village. The population density was 2,264.6 inhabitants per square mile (874.4/km^{2}). There were 5,125 housing units at an average density of 1,012.8 per square mile (391.0/km^{2}). The racial makeup of the village was 95.5% White, 0.8% African American, 0.3% Native American, 1.7% Asian, 0.6% from other races, and 1.0% from two or more races. Hispanic or Latino people of any race were 2.3% of the population.

There were 4,863 households, of which 29.9% had children under the age of 18 living with them, 54.1% were married couples living together, 8.2% had a female householder with no husband present, 3.4% had a male householder with no wife present, and 34.4% were non-families. 29.0% of all households were made up of individuals, and 11% had someone living alone who was 65 years of age or older. The average household size was 2.36 and the average family size was 2.92.

The median age in the village was 40.7 years. 22.7% of residents were under the age of 18; 7.5% were between the ages of 18 and 24; 25.8% were from 25 to 44; 28.8% were from 45 to 64; and 15.3% were 65 years of age or older. The gender makeup of the village was 48.3% male and 51.7% female.

=== 2000 census ===
As of the census of 2000, there were 10,312 people, 4,048 households, and 2,878 families residing in the village. The population density was 2,552.0 people per square mile (985.5/km^{2}). There were 4,165 housing units at an average density of 1,030.8 per square mile (398.0/km^{2}). The racial makeup of the village was 97.72% White, 0.28% Black or African American, 0.24% Native American, 0.75% Asian, 0.01% Pacific Islander, 0.37% from other races, and 0.63% from two or more races. 1.60% of the population were Hispanic or Latino of any race.

There were 4,048 households, out of which 34.5% had children under the age of 18 living with them, 61.4% were married couples living together, 7.2% had a female householder with no husband present, and 28.9% were non-families. 24.2% of all households were made up of individuals, and 8.4% had someone living alone who was 65 years of age or older. The average household size was 2.54 and the average family size was 3.06.

In the village, the population was spread out, with 26.3% under the age of 18, 7.0% from 18 to 24, 31.4% from 25 to 44, 23.5% from 45 to 64, and 11.7% who were 65 years of age or older. The median age was 37 years. For every 100 females there were 96.5 males. For every 100 females age 18 and over, there were 93.7 males.

The median income for a household in the village was $53,918, and the median income for a family was $65,825. Males had a median income of $45,451 versus $27,488 for females. The per capita income for the village was $25,948. About 0.6% of families and 1.7% of the population were below the poverty line, including 1.7% of those under age 18 and 5.1% of those age 65 or over.

== Economy ==
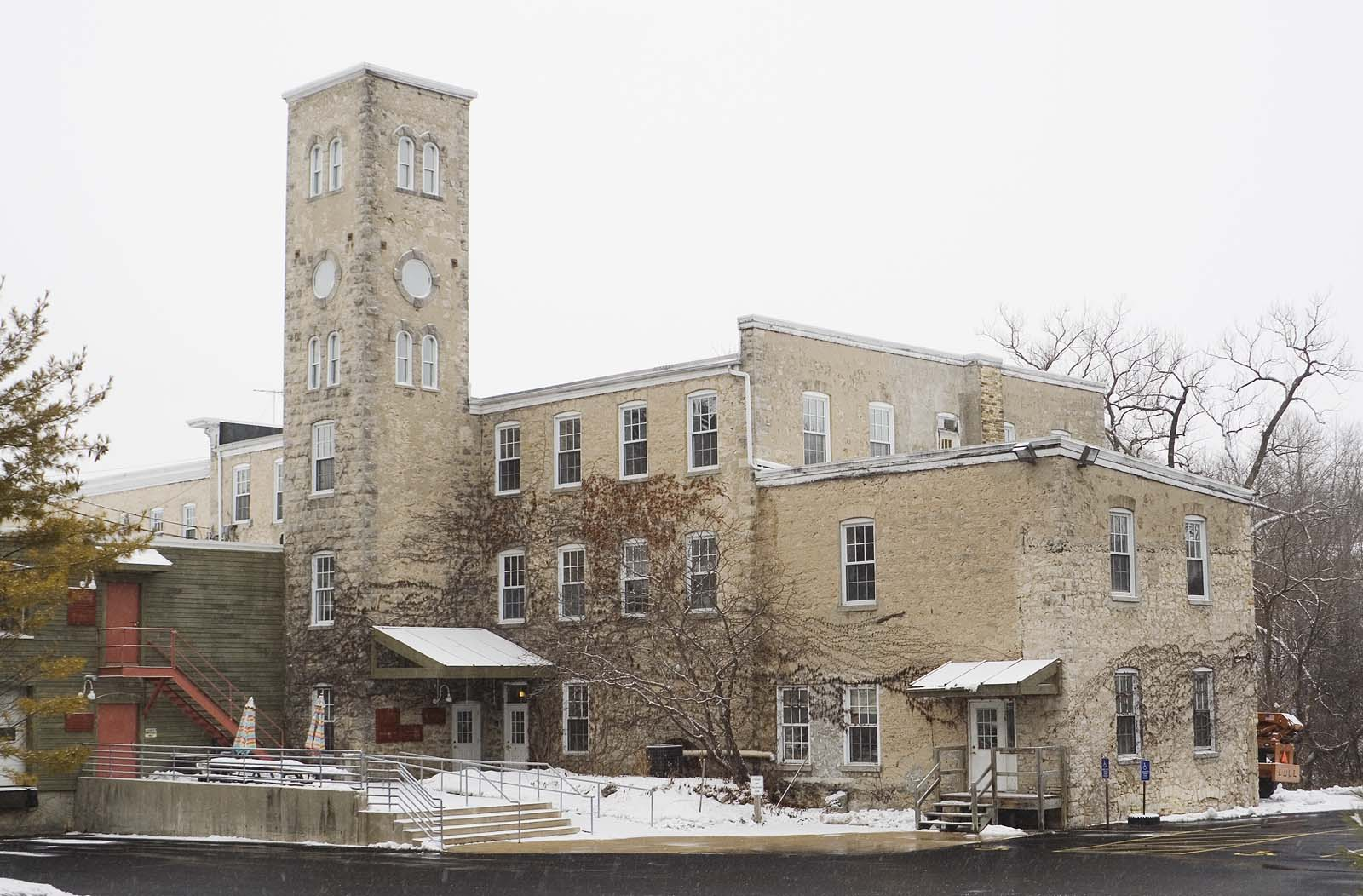
The Cedarburg Woolen Co. Worsted Mill was constructed in 1880 and ceased production in 1980. It currently houses shops, offices, and studios.

As is the case in many of the cities and villages in Ozaukee County, Grafton's early economy was primarily agricultural and the first major businesses were hydropowered mills on the Milwaukee River. One of the first was the Grafton Flour Mill, which opened in 1846. The village also had sawmills and a chair-and-bedstead factory. In 1880, the owner of Cedarburg's woolen mill opened a mill in Grafton to make worsted yarn. At its height, Grafton's woolen mill employed 100 people and remained in operation until 1980.

In the early 20th century, the Wisconsin Chair Company of Port Washington operated a chair factory in the village. At the time, the company was the largest business in Ozaukee County, employing one-sixth of all workers. Among other the wooden furniture, the company manufactured phonographs for Edison Records. In 1917, the company decided to start its own subsidiary record label: Paramount Records. In the 1920s, Paramount produced records for African-American consumers, and from 1929 to 1935, Paramount recorded and manufactured records in-house at the Grafton chair factory before closing during the Great Depression.

In the 21st century, Grafton's largest employers are in retail, health care, and manufacturing. In the early 2000s, a commercial district with big-box stores developed in eastern Grafton. Many of the village's largest retailers are located in the eastern Grafton commercial district near the intersection of Interstate 43 and Wisconsin Highway 60. Aurora Medical Center Grafton, which opened in 2010, is the largest employer in the village and is also located in the eastern commercial district. Many residents commute for work, reflecting the larger trend of Ozaukee County as a majority-commuter community.

Largest employers in Grafton, 2019
Rank	Employer	Industry	Employees
1	Aurora Medical Center in Grafton	Health care	500–999
2	Meijer	Retail	250–499
3	Kapco	Fabricated metal manufacturing	250–499
4	Calibre	OEM paint finishing	250–499
5	Grafton School District	Primary and secondary education	250–499
6	Pace Industries	Die casting manufacturing	250–499
7	Costco	Retail	100–249
8	Miba Industrial Bearings	Industrial bearing manufacturing	100–249
9	Holton Brothers Inc.	Masonry contractor	100–249
10	Exacto Spring Corporation	Spring wire form manufacturing	100–249

== Culture ==
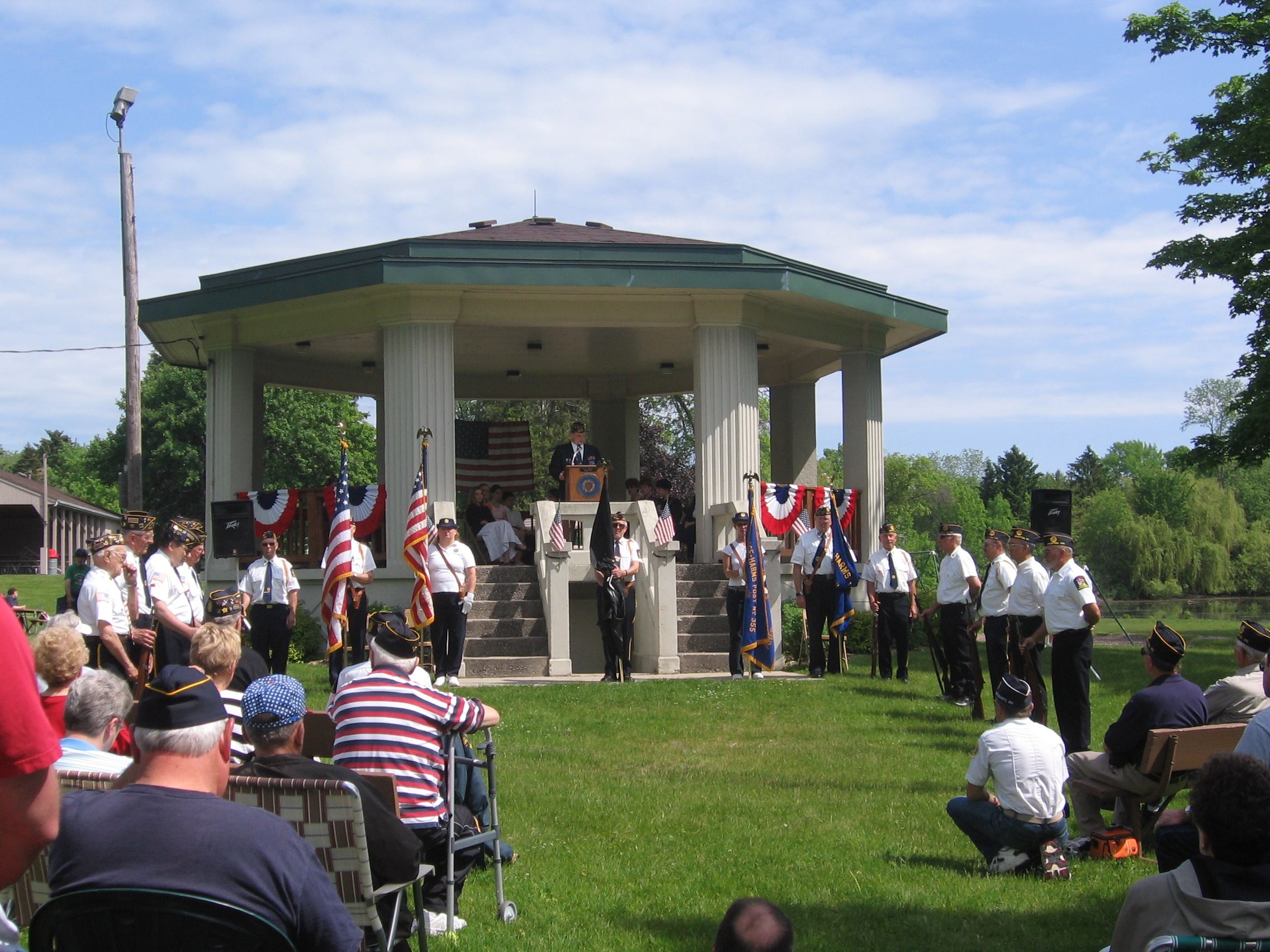
The 2007 Memorial Day service at Grafton's Veterans Park next to the Milwaukee River

=== Grafton Public Library ===
Grafton's first public library opened in 1956 and was established by a commission of community organizations, including churches, the Lion's Club, and the women's club. In 1989, the library moved to its current building, the USS Liberty Memorial Public Library. The library is a member of the Monarch Library System, comprising 31 libraries in Ozaukee, Sheboygan, Washington, and Dodge counties. The library maintains a display dedicated to the USS Liberty incident, which includes documents as well as a piece of the ship.

=== Religion ===
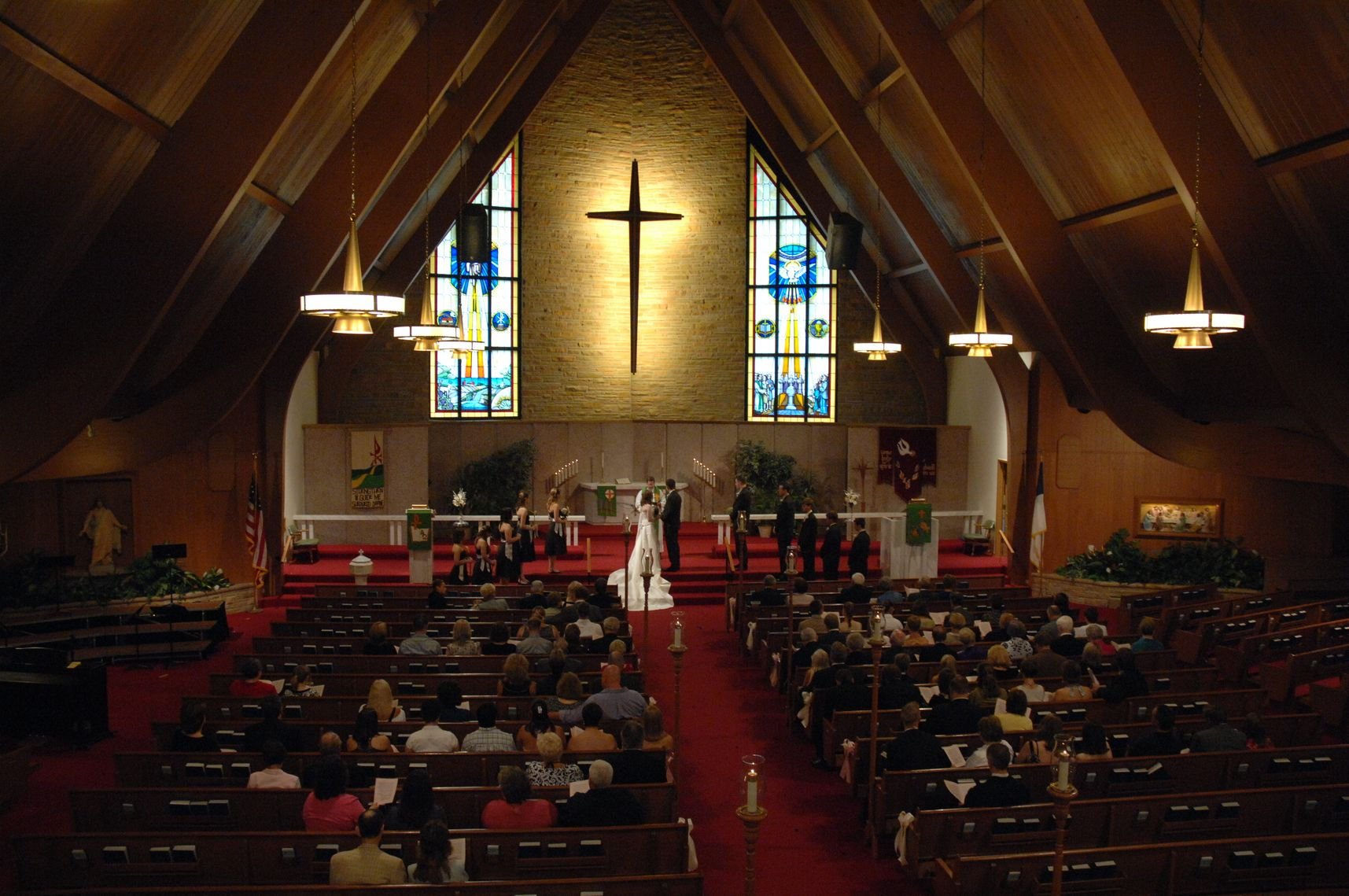
A wedding at St. Paul's Lutheran Church in Grafton

The oldest congregations in Grafton are St. Joseph's Parish, a Roman Catholic church established in 1849, and St. Paul Lutheran Church, which was established in 1851 and is affiliated with the Missouri Synod. Both congregations operate parochial schools offering kindergarten through eighth grade.

The Grafton area has three additional Lutheran congregations: Grace Lutheran Church in the village and St. John's Lutheran Church in the unincorporated community of Lakefield are members of the Evangelical Lutheran Church in America, while Our Savior Lutheran Church in the Town of Grafton is part of the Wisconsin Evangelical Lutheran Synod. Our Savior includes a kindergarten-through-eighth-grade parochial school. Grafton is also home to the Pilgrim United Church of Christ. The Ozaukee Congregational Church is located in Lakefield.

There are four evangelical churches in the area. New Life Church and Cedar Creek Community Church, an evangelical Baptist congregation, are located in the village. The EFCA-affiliated Cornerstone Church and the Vineyard Church are located in the Town of Grafton near the municipal boundary with the village.

== Law and government ==
Grafton is organized as a village governed by an elected village board, comprising a village president and six trustees. The current president is Daniel Delorit. The board meets on the first and third Monday of each month at 6 p.m. The village's day-to-day operations are managed by a full-time village administrator.

As part of Wisconsin's 6th congressional district, Grafton is represented by Glenn Grothman (R) in the United States House of Representatives, and by Ron Johnson (R) and Tammy Baldwin (D) in the United States Senate. Jodi Habush Sinykin (D) represents Grafton in the Wisconsin State Senate, and Paul Melotik (R) represents Grafton in the Wisconsin State Assembly.

=== Grafton Fire Department ===
Grafton's volunteer fire department was founded in 1896 when the village incorporated. The community has one fire station and approximately 50 volunteer firefighters. William Rice has served as fire chief since 2013.

=== Grafton Police Department ===
The Grafton Police Department was organized in 1956. The department employs 22 full-time officers, five full-time dispatchers, and one administrative assistant. Jeff Caponera has served as police chief since September 2020.

== Education ==
Grafton is served by both the Grafton School District and the Cedarburg School District. The Grafton School District has two elementary schools, serving grades kindergarten through fourth grade: John F. Kennedy Elementary School and Woodview Elementary School. Grafton residents in the Cedarburg School District attend Thorson Elementary. John Long Middle School serves the entire district for grades five through eight, and Grafton High School serves grades nine through twelve.

The district is governed by a seven-member elected school board, which meets on the fourth Monday of the month at 6 p.m. in the Grafton High School Library. The district also a superintendent. Jeff Nelson, the current superintendent, has held the position since 2016.

Grafton also has three parochial schools that serve students from kindergarten through eighth grade: Our Savior Lutheran School, St. Joseph Catholic Parish School, and St. Paul Lutheran School.

Grafton is in the Milwaukee Area Technical College District, whose nearest campus is located in Mequon.

== Health and utilities ==
Grafton and the surrounding communities are served by Aurora Medical Center Grafton, which U.S. News & World Report ranked at the 5th best hospital in Wisconsin as of 2020. The hospital opened in late 2010 and was part of Aurora's acquisition of the Advanced Healthcare physicians group. Industry experts estimated that the acquisition and construction of the Grafton hospital cost $250 million. Aurora also operates an urgent care center and walk-in clinic in the village.

The village provides sewage disposal and water supply services.

== Transportation ==
Interstate 43 passes through the eastern part of the village with access via Exit 92 and Exit 93. Wisconsin Highway 60 also passes through the downtown area.

Grafton has limited public transit compared with larger cities. Ozaukee County Transit Services' Shared Ride Taxi is the public transit option for traveling to sites not directly accessible from the interstate. The taxis operate seven days a week and make connections to Washington County Transit and Milwaukee County Routes 12, 49 and 42u.

The Village of Grafton has sidewalks in most areas, as well as the Ozaukee Interurban Trail, which is for pedestrian and bicycle use, and connects the village to the neighboring communities of Cedarburg and Port Washington, and continues north to Sheboygan County and south to Milwaukee County.

The Wisconsin Central Ltd. (Canadian National) railroad operates a freight rail line which passes through the village and the Union Pacific Railroad (formerly the Chicago & Northwestern Railway) has a line which borders the eastern municipal limits in the Town of Grafton. While Grafton has not had passenger rail in many decades, passenger rail is offered by Amtrak in nearby Milwaukee at the Milwaukee Intermodal Station.

== Parks and recreation ==
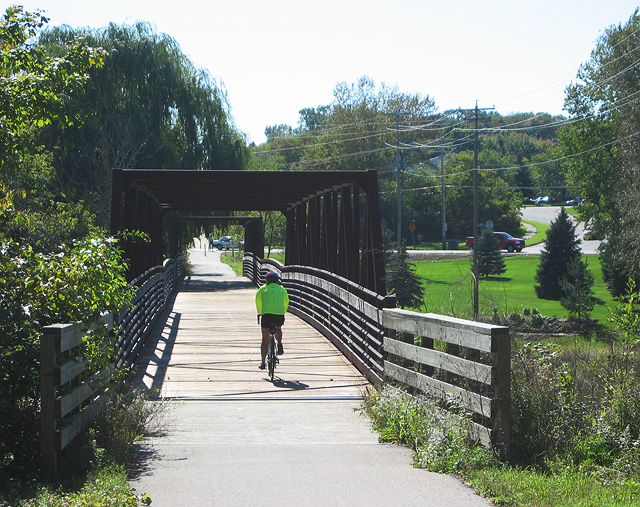
A metal truss bridge on the Ozaukee Interurban Trail in northern Grafton

Grafton maintains 17 parks, encompassing over 120 acres of the land. Parks range from as small as the 1-acre Acorn Park to the 27-acre Centennial Park and the 28-acre Lime Kiln Park. The village has picnic shelters, two baseball fields, a municipal golf course, a soccer practice field, a disc golf course, a public pool, and canoe launches on the Milwaukee River. The parks and recreation department offers over thirty recreation programs for residents.

The Ozaukee Interurban Trail runs through the Village of Grafton, following the former route of the Milwaukee Interurban Rail Line. The southern end of the trail is at the Milwaukee-Ozaukee County border in Brown Deer, where the trail becomes the Oak Leaf Trail (43°09′48″N 87°57′39″W), and its northern end is at DeMaster Road in the Village of Oostburg Sheboygan County (43°36′57″N 87°48′08″W). The trail connects the community to neighboring Cedarburg and Port Washington.

There are also two commercial golf courses in the Town of Grafton north of the village.

== Notable people ==
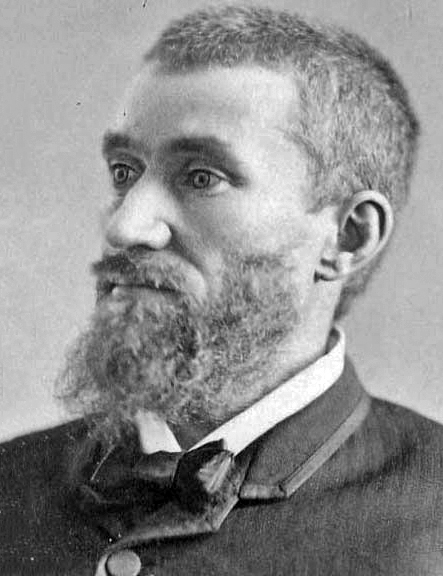
Charles J. Guiteau (1841–1882) assassinated U.S. President James A. Garfield in 1881. Guiteau lived in Ulao near Grafton during his adolescence.

- Beau Benzschawel, football player
- Kathy Cramer, political scientist
- Peter Cunningham, race car driver
- Charles Guiteau, assassin of James Garfield
- Susan Lynn Hefle, scientist
- Barbara M. Joosse, author
- John J. Jungers, legislator and businessman
- Dick Karth, racing driver
- Dave Levenick, football player
- Paytn Monticelli, softball player
- Rich Strenger, football player
- Susan B. Vergeront, legislator
- Frank J. Weber, legislator and union organizer
- Ralph Zaun, legislator and businessman
