= Zaun =

Zaun may refer to:

== People ==
- Brad Zaun, senator in Iowa
- Gregg Zaun, former professional baseball catcher
- Jeff Zaun, association football player
- Ralph Zaun, businessman and politician

== Places ==
- Zaun, Meiringen, a settlement in the Swiss canton of Bern
- Zaun, a city located within Runeterra in the lore of online game League of Legends.

== See also ==
- Zauner
- Zaunkönig (disambiguation)
