= Grafton (town), Wisconsin =

Town in Ozaukee County, Wisconsin

Town of Grafton, Wisconsin
- Town
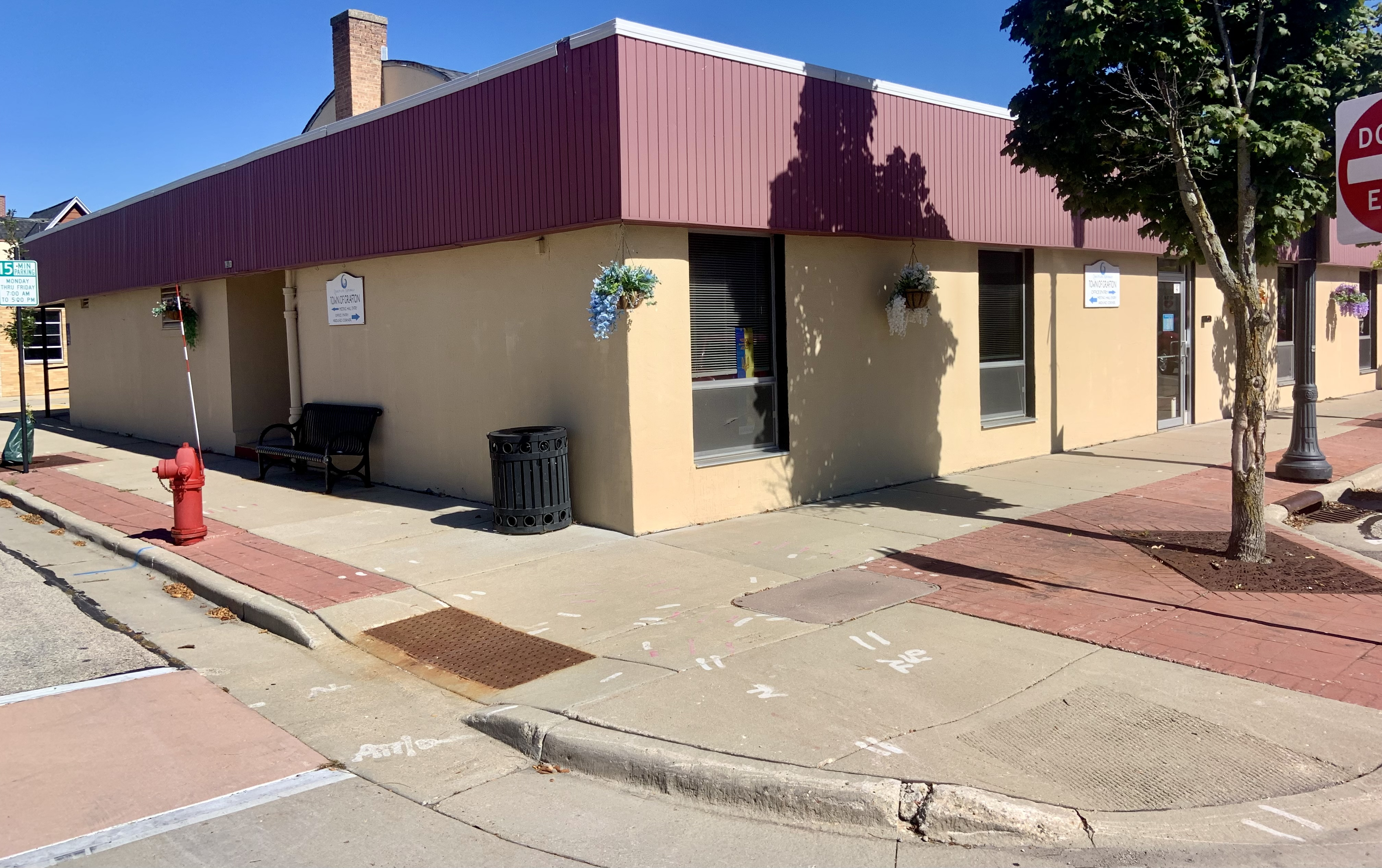
- Town hall

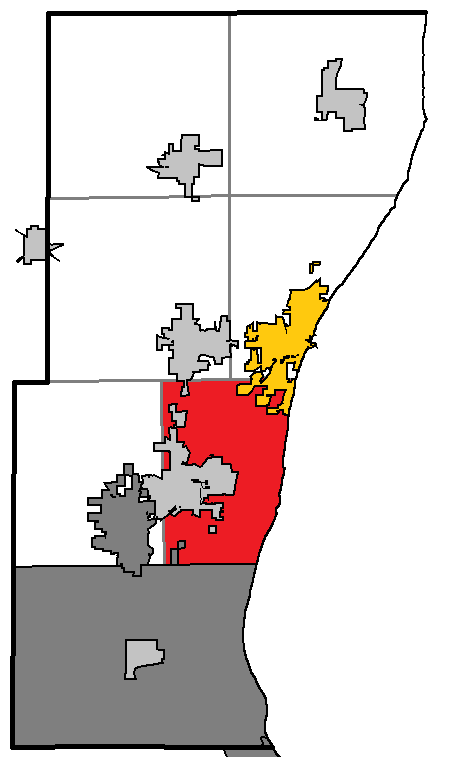
- Location of the Town of Grafton, within Ozaukee County, Wisconsin.
- Coordinates: 43°19′05″N 87°54′11″W
- Country: United States
- State: Wisconsin
- County: Ozaukee
- Settled: 1839
- Incorporated: 1846; 180 years ago

Government
  - Town Chairman: Lester A. Bartel Jr.
  - Clerk: Lisa Kien
  - Board of supervisors: Supervisors: Tom Grabow; Paul Melotik; Tom Sykora; Karron Stockwell

Area
  - Total: 21.4 sq mi (55.5 km^{2})
  - Land: 19.8 sq mi (51.3 km^{2})
  - Water: 1.6 sq mi (4.1 km^{2})
- Elevation: 750 ft (230 m)

Population (2020)
  - Total: 4,355
  - Estimate (2021): 4,391
  - Density: 220/sq mi (84.9/km^{2})
- Time zone: UTC-6 (Central (CST))
  - Summer (DST): UTC-5 (CDT)
- Postal code: 53024
- Area code: 262
- Website: townofgraftonwi.gov

The Town of Grafton is a town located in Ozaukee County, Wisconsin, United States, and is in the Milwaukee metropolitan area. The town was created in 1846 and at the time of the 2020 Census had a population of 4,355.

Grafton is located on the western shore of Lake Michigan. German and Irish immigrants first settled in Grafton in the 1840s. Their centers of settlement became the unincorporated communities of Lakefield and Ulao, as well as the Village of Grafton, which is partially located in the town.

== History ==
The first Europeans to visit the area were the Jesuit missionaries Claude-Jean Allouez and Claude Bablon, who visited a Native American village on the Milwaukee River near the future site of Grafton around the year 1670.

Timothy Wooden, who arrived in 1839 from the eastern United States, is considered Grafton's first permanent resident. The majority of the early residents were immigrants from Germany and Ireland. The Wisconsin territorial legislature officially created the Town of Grafton in 1846.

James T. Gifford, an investor who founded Elgin, Illinois, developed the community of Ulao in 1847 as a port on Lake Michigan. At the time, steamships were common on the Great Lakes and burned massive amounts of wood for fuel. A steamship could consume wood equivalent to several acres worth of forest on single journey. Much of Grafton was primeval beech-maple forest, which settlers were clearing for agriculture, and Gifford saw an opportunity for Ulao to prosper as a steamship refueling station. He built a sawmill, a warehouse, and a one-thousand-foot-long pier on the lake where ships docked to buy wood. The community prospered in the 1850s and 1860s, but by the end of the American Civil War, Ozaukee County's forests had been largely depleted, and Ulao declined, with most of the land being converted to agriculture.

The Village of Grafton was incorporated from some of the town's land in 1896.

In the late 1930s, a group of pro-Nazi German-Americans affiliated with the German American Bund purchased land on the Milwaukee River in the Town of Grafton. They ran a private camp called Camp Hindenburg, and hosted a speech by Nazi-supporter Fritz Julius Kuhn in 1939. The camp closed with the outbreak of World War II in 1941. George Froboese, a prominent member of the camp, committed suicide in 1942 while being escorted to New York to answer a Federal subpoena. Paul Knauer, another member of the camp, was stripped of his U.S. citizenship for having falsely taken the oath of allegiance and was deported back to Germany after the war.

In 1940, the pro-American, anti-Bund Wisconsin Federation of German-American Societies opened Camp Carl Schurz in the Town of Grafton to compete with the Nazi-sympathizers.

Grafton experienced significant population growth during the suburbanization that followed World War II, and the village annexed more farm land from the town of Grafton for residential subdivisions and commercial developments. The construction of Interstate 43 in the mid-1960s connected Grafton to other communities, such as Milwaukee and Sheboygan.

== Geography ==
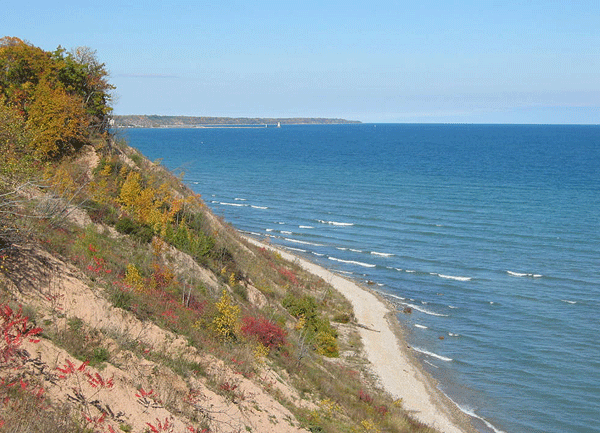
The clay bluffs on Lake Michigan and the Port Washington Breakwater Light seen from Lion's Den Gorge park in the Town of Grafton.

According to the United States Census Bureau, the town has a total area of 21.4 square miles (55 km^{2}), of which 19.8 square miles (51 km^{2}) is land and 1.6 square miles (4.1 km^{2}) (7.47%) is water.

The Village of Grafton is mostly located in what was formerly the town's western half. The town is also bordered by the City of Port Washington, Town of Port Washington, and Town of Saukville to the north; the City of Mequon to the south; the City of Cedarburg and the City of Cedarburg to the west; and Lake Michigan to the east. The unincorporated communities of Lakefield and Ulao are also located in the town.

The town is located on the western shore of Lake Michigan, and the coastline is characterized by clay bluffs ranging from 80 to 140 feet (24 to 43 meters) in height with deep ravines where streams flow into the lake. Clay bluffs are a geological formation which are characteristic of the Lake Michigan shoreline and are found in few other areas of the world. Much of the coast has mixed gravel and sand beaches. The Kevich Light, a privately owned lighthouse on the lake, is located in the town.

The town is located in the Southeastern Wisconsin glacial till plains that were created by the Wisconsin glaciation during the most recent ice age. The soil is clayey glacial till with a thin layer of loess on the surface. The Wisconsin Department of Natural Resources considers the eastern part of the town along the lake to be in the Central Lake Michigan Coastal ecological landscape, while the western part of the town is in the Southeast Glacial Plains ecological landscape.

Before white settlers arrived in the area, the Grafton area was an upland forest dominated by American beech and sugar maple trees. There were also white cedars growing along the Milwaukee River, which flows through Grafton. Much of the original forest was cleared to prepare the land for agriculture. The Bratt Woods nature preserve and the Kurtz Woods State Natural Area, which are both maintained by the Ozaukee Washington Land Trust, have old growth endemic trees and retain the character of the pre-settlement beech-maple forests.

As land development continues to reduce wild areas, wildlife is forced into closer proximity with human communities like Grafton. Large mammals, including white-tailed deer, coyotes, and red foxes can be seen in the town. Many birds, including great blue herons and wild turkeys are found in the town, and waterfowl including green herons and American bitterns breed in the town's wetlands. The Bratt Woods nature preserve is a habitat for the American gromwell, a State-designated special concern plant species.

The region struggles with many invasive species, including the emerald ash borer, common carp, reed canary grass, the common reed, purple loosestrife, garlic mustard, Eurasian buckthorns, and honeysuckles.

== Demographics ==
As of the census of 2000, there were 4,132 people, 1,569 households, and 1,241 families residing in the town. The population density was 208.5 people per square mile (80.5/km^{2}). There were 1,608 housing units at an average density of 81.1 per square mile (31.3/km^{2}). The racial makeup of the town was 98.02% White, 0.34% Black or African American, 0.22% Native American, 0.48% Asian, 0.10% Pacific Islander, 0.34% from other races, and 0.51% from two or more races. 1.11% of the population were Hispanic or Latino of any race.

There were 1,569 households, out of which 33.5% had children under the age of 18 living with them, 71.5% were married couples living together, 5.0% had a female householder with no husband present, and 20.9% were non-families. 16.1% of all households were made up of individuals, and 4.8% had someone living alone who was 65 years of age or older. The average household size was 2.63 and the average family size was 2.98.

In the town, the population was spread out, with 24.7% under the age of 18, 5.9% from 18 to 24, 28.0% from 25 to 44, 31.2% from 45 to 64, and 10.2% who were 65 years of age or older. The median age was 41 years. For every 100 females, there were 104.6 males. For every 100 females age 18 and over, there were 101.2 males.

The median income for a household in the town was $64,707, and the median income for a family was $73,125. Males had a median income of $42,320 versus $35,446 for females. The per capita income for the town was $30,582. About 4.0% of families and 5.1% of the population were below the poverty line, including 6.4% of those under age 18 and 8.0% of those age 65 or over.

== Law and government ==
Grafton is organized as a town governed by an elected board, comprising a chairman and four supervisors. The current chairman is Lester A. Bartel Jr. The board meets on the second Wednesday of each month at 7 p.m. in the town hall which is located in the Village of Grafton.

As part of Wisconsin's 6th congressional district, Grafton is represented by Glenn Grothman (R) in the United States House of Representatives, and by Ron Johnson (R) and Tammy Baldwin (D) in the United States Senate. Alberta Darling (R) represents Grafton in the Wisconsin State Senate, and Deb Andraca (D) represents Grafton in the Wisconsin State Assembly.

== Education ==
Much of the town of Grafton is served by the Grafton School District, which has two elementary schools, serving kindergarten through fifth grade: John F. Kennedy Elementary School and Woodview Elementary School. John Long Middle School serves the entire district for grades six through eight, and Grafton High School serves grades nine through twelve.

The district is governed by a seven-member elected school board, which meets on the fourth Monday of the month at 6 p.m. in the Grafton High School Library. The current district superintendent, Jeff Nelson, has held the position since 2016.

Some residents in the southwestern part of the town attend the Cedarburg School District, and residents in the northeastern part of the town attend the Port Washington-Saukville School District.

Grafton also has three parochial schools that serve students from kindergarten through eight grade: Our Savior Lutheran School, St. Joseph Catholic Parish School, and St. Paul Lutheran School.

== Transportation ==
Interstate 43 passes through the town with access via Exit 92 and Exit 93, and Wisconsin Highway 60 also passes through Ulao and the downtown Village of Grafton.

Grafton has limited public transit compared with larger cities. Ozaukee County and the Milwaukee County Transit System run the Route 143 commuter bus, also known as the "Ozaukee County Express," to Milwaukee via Interstate 43. The bus makes two stops at park-and-ride lots in the village off of Exit 92: one at the Grafton Commons shopping center and the other in the Target parking lot. The bus operates Monday through Friday with limited hours corresponding to peak commute times. Ozaukee County Transit Services' Shared Ride Taxi is the public transit option for traveling to sites not directly accessible from the interstate. The taxis operate seven days a week and make connections to Washington County Transit and Milwaukee County Routes 12, 49 and 42u.

The Ozaukee Interurban Trail, which is for pedestrian and bicycle use, goes through both the town and the Village of Grafton, connecting residents to the neighboring communities of Cedarburg and Port Washington. The trail continues north to Sheboygan County and south to Milwaukee County.

The Wisconsin Central Ltd. railroad operates a freight rail line which passes through the town and goes north to Saukville and south to Cedarburg. The Union Pacific Railroad runs parallel to Interstate 43. The town currently does not have a train station.

== Parks and recreation ==
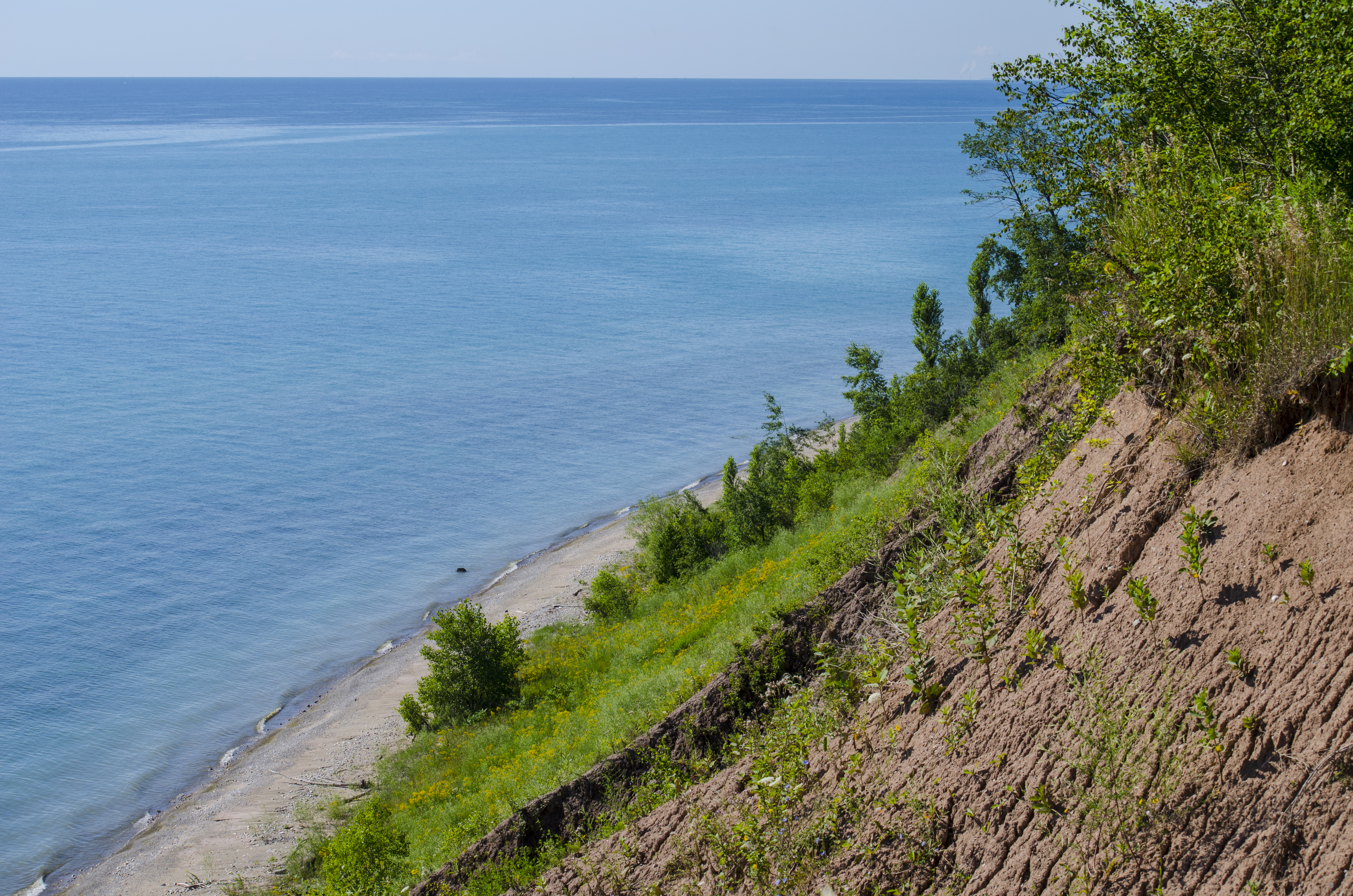
The clay bluffs on Lake Michigan at Lions Den Gorge Nature Preserve.

- Blue Wing Waterfowl Production Area: The United States Fish and Wildlife Service maintains a 54-acre wetland and prairie preserve which is home to species including green herons and American bitterns.
- Bratt Woods: The Ozaukee Washington Land Trust maintains this 17-acre park on the eastern bank of the Milwaukee River. The forest features endemic plants and retains the character of the beech-maple forests that sprawled across Ozaukee County in the early 19th century. The land is also a habitat for the American gromwell, a state-designated special concern plant species.
- Kurtz Woods Natural Area: Designated as a state natural area, the Ozaukee Washington Land Trust maintains this 45-acre park, which is split between the Town of Grafton and the Village of Saukville. The preserve boasts 82 documented plant species in a primeval beech-maple forest, and landforms in the park include glacially formed kettles.
- Lion's Den Gorge Nature Preserve: Ozaukee County maintains this 73-acre park on the shores of Lake Michigan with picnic facilities, walking trails, a beach, and views of the lake from 100-foot-high bluffs.
- Ulao Waterfowl Production Area: The U.S. Fish and Wildlife Service maintains a 44-acre waterfowl sanctuary adjacent to Lion's Den Gorge Nature Preserve trails for hiking and opportunities to observe dozens of bird species, including loons, scoters, and ducks.

The Ozaukee Interurban Trail runs through the town, following the former route of the Milwaukee Interurban Rail Line. The southern end of the trail is at Bradley Road in Brown Deer which connects to the Oak Leaf Trail (43°09′48″N 87°57′39″W), and its northern end is at DeMaster Road in the Village of Oostburg Sheboygan County (43°36′57″N 87°48′08″W). The trail connects the community to neighboring Cedarburg and Port Washington.

There are also two private, commercial golf courses in the town and the privately owned 20-acre Grafton Dells River Park.

An indoor half-pipe ramp, the Midwest Vert Ramp, opened in 2024 in a privately owned barn. It is the tallest half-pipe in the continent. The ramp has faced legal challenges from the town's Board of Supervisors due to safety concerns.

== Notable people ==
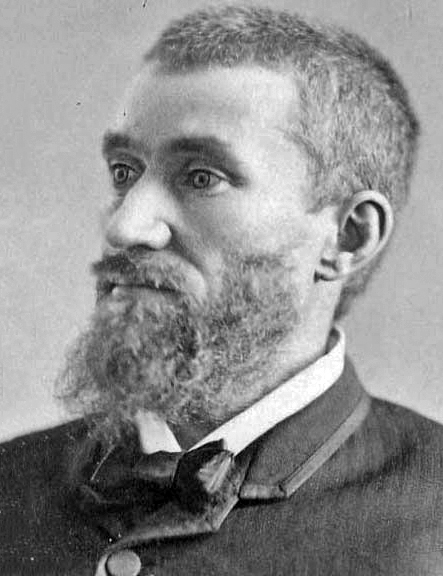
Charles J. Guiteau (1841–1882) assassinated U.S. President James A. Garfield in 1881. Guiteau lived in Ulao during his adolescence.

- Charles Guiteau, assassin of President James Garfield; lived in Ulao from 1850 to 1855
