= Cedarburg Woolen Co. Worsted Mill =

- U.S. National Register of Historic Places
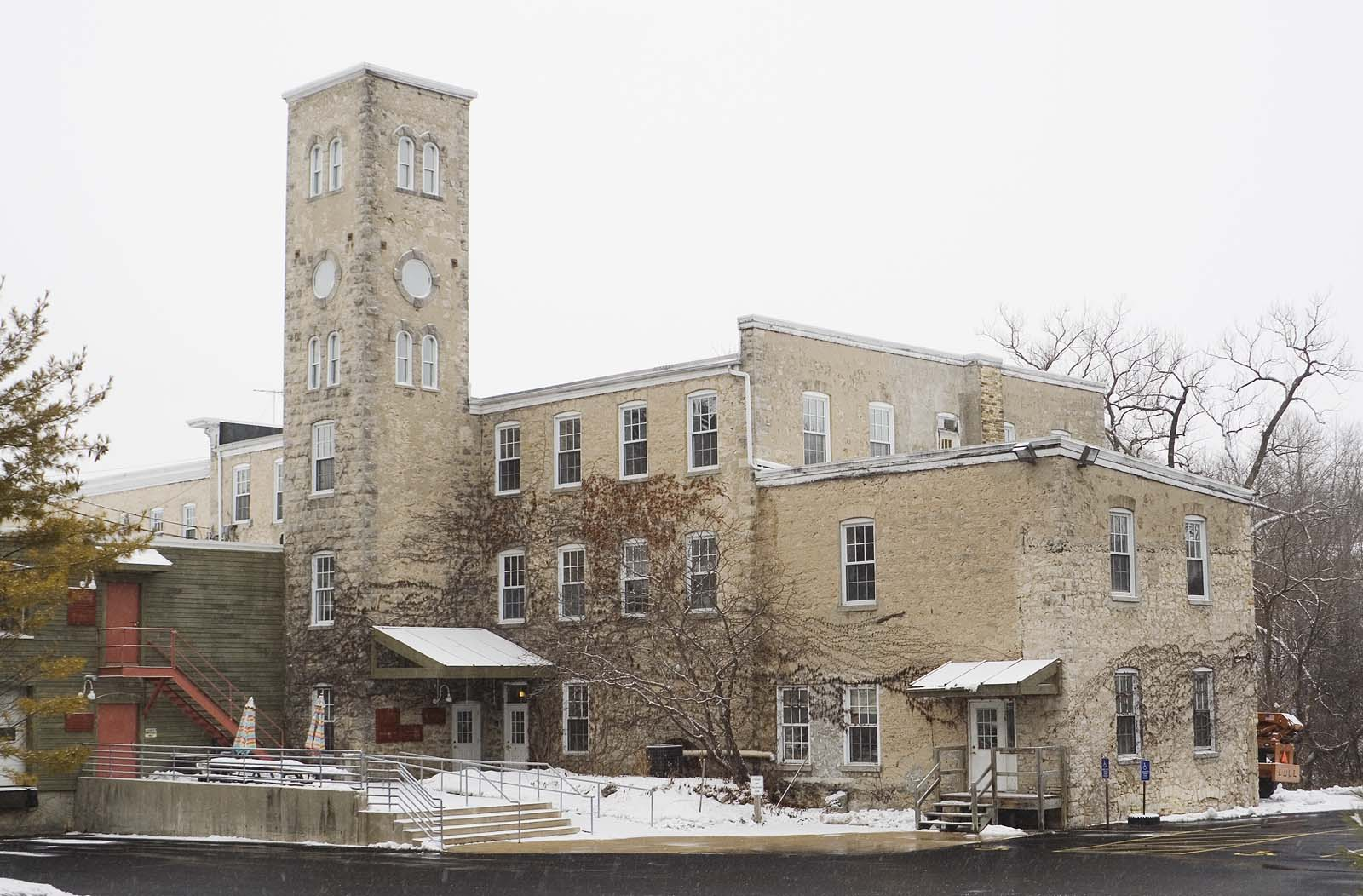
- Cedarburg Woolen Co. Worsted Mill

- Location within Wisconsin
- Location: 1350 14th Ave. Grafton, Wisconsin
- Coordinates: 43.31753°N 87.94898°W
- Built: 1880
- NRHP reference No.: 83003408
- Added to NRHP: June 30, 1983

The Cedarburg Woolen Co. Worsted Mill is a former woolen mill on the Milwaukee River in Grafton, Wisconsin. In the late-1800s, the Cedarburg Woolen Company in neighboring Cedarburg decided to expand their production by opening a second mill.

== History ==
The mill was constructed next to the Grafton Flour Mill in 1880 at a cost of $40,000 to make worsted yarn and was the only one of its kind west of Philadelphia. In 1882, a group of investors bought the mill and formed the Grafton Worsted Company. Diedrich Wittenberg, the president of the group, was also the owner of the Cedarburg Woolen Company.

In 1902, Wittenberg's son and his son-in-law purchased the building and formed the Badger Worsted Company, which combed, spun, dyed and packaged yarn in the building until 1980. During the Great Depression, the company acquired the neighboring Grafton Flour Mill and converted it to worsted yarn production as well. The building was added to the National Register of Historic Places in 1983, and currently houses shops, offices, and studios.

At its height, the Grafton mill employed 100 people.

== See also ==
- Hilgen and Wittenberg Woolen Mill
