= Ethmia longimaculella =

Scientific classification
- Kingdom: Animalia
- Phylum: Arthropoda
- Clade: Pancrustacea
- Class: Insecta
- Order: Lepidoptera
- Family: Depressariidae
- Genus: Ethmia
- Species: E. longimaculella

Binomial name
- Ethmia longimaculella (Chambers, 1872)

Synonyms
- Hyponomeuta longimaculella Chambers, 1872; Psecadia walsinghamella Beutenmuller, 1889; Ethmia walsinghamella; Ethmia coranella Dyar, 1902

Species of moth

Ethmia longimaculella, the streaked ethmia moth, is a moth in the family Depressariidae. It is found from southern Canada and the northern United States east of the Rocky Mountains. In the Midwest, the range extends south to Texas.

The length of the forewings is 8.8–11.2 mm (0.35–0.44 in). The ground color of the forewings is white, with black markings, mostly in the form of longitudinal streaks. The ground color of the hindwings is whitish, basally becoming pale brownish. Adults of subspecies longimaculella are generally on wing from late May to early July, while those of subspecies coranella have been recorded in May, June and August.

The larvae feed on Lithospermum species, including Lithospermum officinale and Lithospermum latifolium. Larvae have also been reared from Onosmodium hispidissimum.

== Subspecies ==
- Ethmia longimaculella longimaculella (southern Canada to eastern Kentucky)
- Ethmia longimaculella coranella (Dyar, 1902) (central and northern Texas)
