= Grafton Flour Mill =

- U.S. National Register of Historic Places
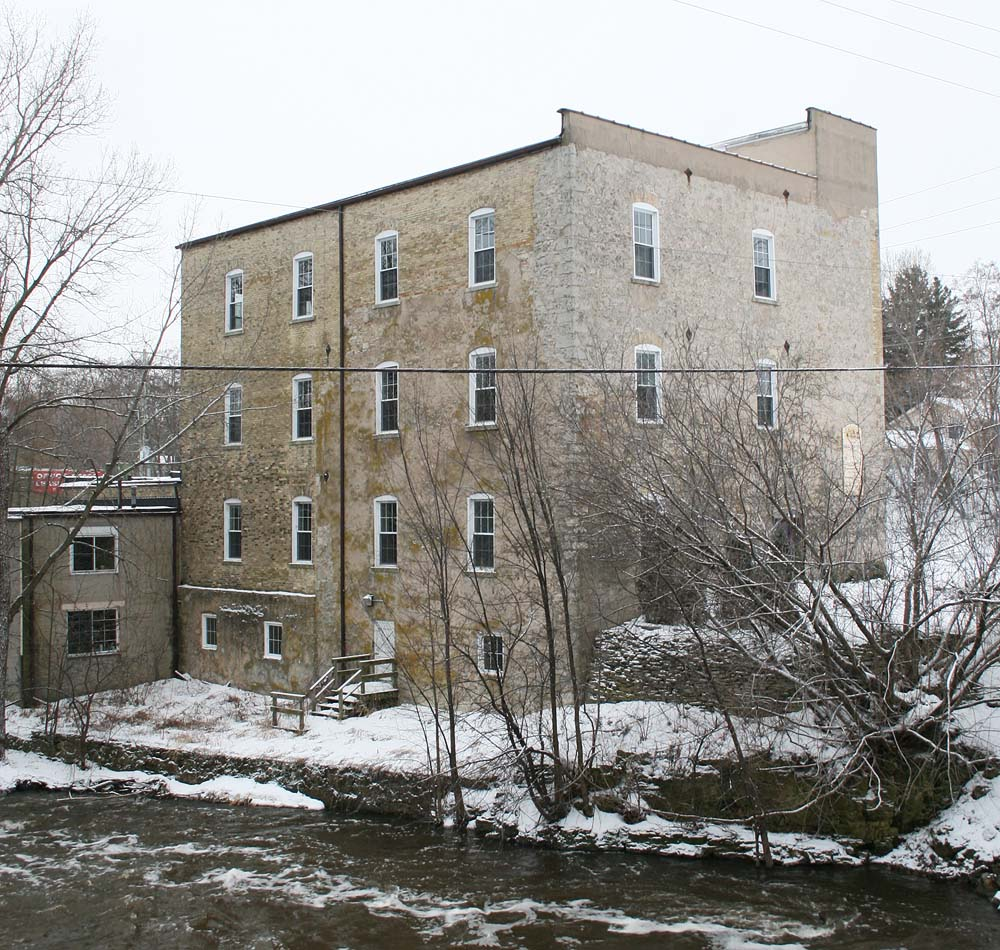
- Grafton Flour Mill

- Location within Wisconsin
- Location: 1300 14th Ave. Grafton, Wisconsin
- Coordinates: 43.31826°N 87.94917°W
- Built: 1847
- NRHP reference No.: 83003409
- Added to NRHP: June 30, 1983

The Grafton Flour Mill is a former grist mill on the Milwaukee River in Grafton, Wisconsin, United States. The original section was built in 1846 by a group of Yankee farmers as a flour mill and produced flour for many years through a succession of owners.

In 1884, the mill caught fire and had to be partially rebuilt. The owner went bankrupt after the fire and sold the mill to the White Lily Flour company.

During the Great Depression it was bought by the neighboring Badger Worsted Mill and was converted to produce worsted yarn. The company left Grafton in 1980, but the building still houses a yarn store, which began as the Badger Worsted Company's factory store, but is now independently owned. The building also houses a coffeeshop, offices, and studios. On June 30, 1983, it was added to the National Register of Historic Places.
