= Hilgen and Wittenberg Woolen Mill =

Historic textile mill in Wisconsin, US

- U.S. National Register of Historic Places
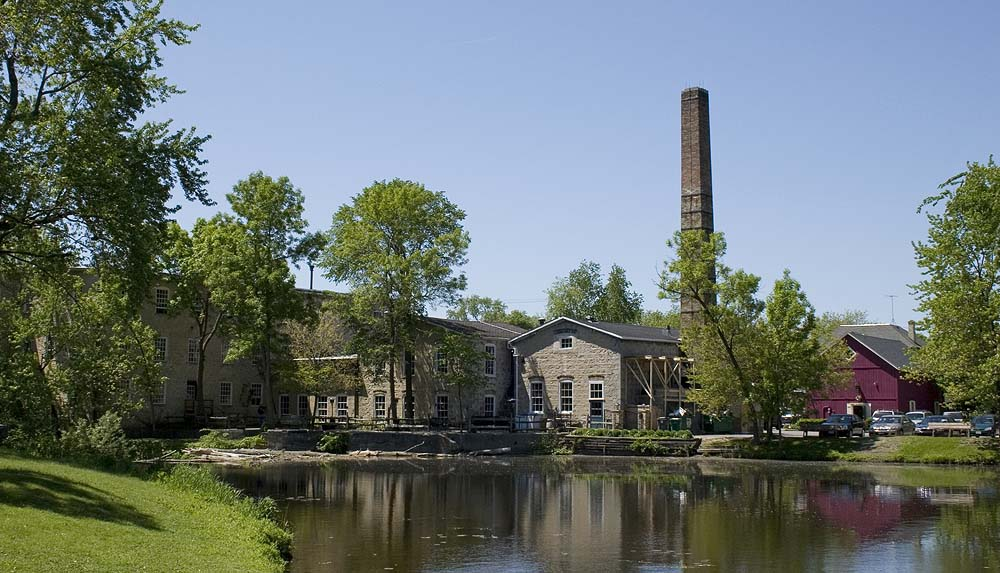
- Hilgen and Wittenberg Woolen Mill

- Location within Wisconsin
- Location: Cedarburg, Wisconsin
- Coordinates: 43°18′4.3″N 87°59′20″W
- Built: 1864-1907
- Architectural style: Greek Revival
- NRHP reference No.: 78000124
- Added to NRHP: December 22, 1978

The Hilgen and Wittenberg Woolen Mill is a textile mill in Cedarburg, Wisconsin. Built in 1864, the mill was one of many wool- and flax-processing factories that opened during the American Civil War, due to a shortage of cotton textiles formerly supplied by southern states. The mill produced yarns, blankets, and flannels, and was the largest woolen mill west of Philadelphia in the 19th century. The mill closed in 1968 and has since become a commercial complex called the "Cedar Creek Settlement," containing restaurants and stores.

== History ==
The outbreak of the American Civil War led to supply shortages of cotton in the North. In 1864, Frederick Hilgen, Dietrich Wittenberg, and Joseph Trottman planned to capitalize on the textile shortage by building a hydropowered factory to process wool. Completed in 1865 at a cost of $30,000, the mill complex initially consisted of two limestone buildings outfitted with state of the art equipment coupled to turbines powered by Cedar Creek. The mill was one of many textile factories that opened in Wisconsin to process wool and flax. To put things in perspective, Wisconsin had 15 woolen mills in 1859, producing a few hundred thousand pounds of textiles. By 1871, the state had 54 mills, producing more than 1.5 million pounds of textiles.

While completed too late to capitalize on the Civil War the mill found success filling demand for fabric and yarn in the wake of the destruction of industry and infrastructure in many southern states. The mill incorporated as the Cedarburg Woolen Company in 1872, with Dietrich Wittenberg serving as president. The owners constructed additional buildings, including offices, a shipping department, a coachhouse, bleaching and dying facilities, warehouses on both sides of the creek, and a factory store. In 1880, the company expanded production to a second factory in Grafton, Wisconsin, specializing in production of worsted yarn. By 1893, the Cedarburg complex had grown from two buildings to twelve and spanned several city blocks. The owners even built a tunnel under Bridge Road to link the factory basement to the bleaching and dying facilities.

In response to a dam washout in 1881 and industrial demand outpacing the availability of hydropower in 1896, the company constructed a boiler house and an engine house and switched from hydropower to steam power. The new facility included two steam-powered fire pumps; an 85-horsepower engine to power the factory's machines; and a 45-horsepower engine with an electric generator, which provided the complex and the neighboring Wittenberg mansion with the first electric light in the City of Cedarburg.

The last major mill expansion occurred in 1907 when a third floor was added to the factory building. The mill began its decline during the Great Depression, when demand waned and the mill was idled. In 1933, the mill's dam washed out for a second time. Construction of a new dam, designed by local engineer Charles Whitney, began in 1938 and was completed in 1939 as a Public Works Administration project for the City of Cedarburg. Its unclear whether the new dam ever provided the mill with hydropower, but its millpond became a popular swimming area, even featuring an artificial beach on the bank opposite the mill. During World War II, the mill temporarily increased production to provide woolen blankets for the war effort but continued to decline after the war. In 1945, the mill stopped its mechanical weaving operations altogether but continued hand weaving of specialty products. The swimming area suffered from poor water quality, leading the city to permanently close the beach in 1949 and construct a public pool in 1959.

In 1968, the mill declared bankruptcy and shut down. The Wittenberg family accepted an offer from a developer who planned to demolish the complex and construct a gas station. However, mayor Stephen Fisher was able to delay the demolition and find a different buyer to preserve the buildings. In January 1972, Jim Pape bought the complex for his winery business.

In 1978, the mill buildings were added to the National Register of Historic Places.

Currently, the mill complex is referred to as Cedar Creek Settlement and houses a restaurant in the former boiler house and specialty stores throughout the other buildings. The former swimming beach is now Boy Scout Park.
