= Kathy Cramer =

American political scientist

Katherine Cramer
- Born: 1970 (age 55–56); Grafton, Wisconsin, United States
- Awards: Heinz I. Eulau Award

Academic work
- Discipline: political science
- Institutions: University of Wisconsin–Madison
- Main interests: rural resentment
- Notable works: The Politics of Resentment

Katherine J. Cramer (born 1970) is an American political scientist. She is a professor in the political science department at the University of Wisconsin–Madison and former director of the Morgridge Center for Public Service.

== Career ==
Cramer is the author of The Politics of Resentment, a book based on almost a decade of studying political attitudes in rural Wisconsin through ethnography. She argues that many rural residents understand politics through the lens of "rural consciousness," an identity as a rural person combined with a sense of injustice. This sense of injustice shows up as a perception that they do not receive their fair share of resources, power or respect, such as a sense that "people like me, in places like this don't get their fair share of respect" and "All the decisions are made in Madison and Milwaukee and nobody’s listening to us". Cramer has found this "rural resentment" comes partly from changes to rural life and partly from massive changes in the economy. Rural people, she asserts, feel overlooked and disrespected by elites; they work hard, yet they see the "good life" is passing them by, which is one reason why they voted for Donald Trump in the 2016 election.

From 2026 to 2027, Cramer served as the Wayne Morse Chair of Law and Politics, established in honor of the late former Senator, at the University of Oregon. She focused on how people decipher politics in general and their specific role in it.

== Publications ==
Some published under the name Katherine Cramer Walsh

- Walsh, Katherine Cramer (2001). Talking about Race: Community Dialogues and the Politics of Difference. University of Chicago Press. ISBN 9780226869063. OCLC 76828861.
- Walsh, Katherine Cramer (2004). Talking about Politics: Informal Groups and Social Identity in American Life. University of Chicago Press. ISBN 9780226872216. OCLC 659560826.
- Walsh, Katherine Cramer (2012). "Putting Inequality in Its Place: Rural Consciousness and the Power of Perspective" (PDF). American Political Science Review. 106 (3): 517–532. doi:10.1017/s0003055412000305. ISSN 1537-5943. S2CID 145378121. Archived from the original (PDF) on February 25, 2020.
- Cramer, Katherine J. (2016). The Politics of Resentment: Rural Consciousness in Wisconsin and the Rise of Scott Walker. Chicago Studies in American Politics. University of Chicago Press. ISBN 978-0226349114.

== Honors and awards ==
- Heinz I. Eulau Award - 2018
- American Academy of Arts and Sciences Fellow - 2019
