= Kevich Light =

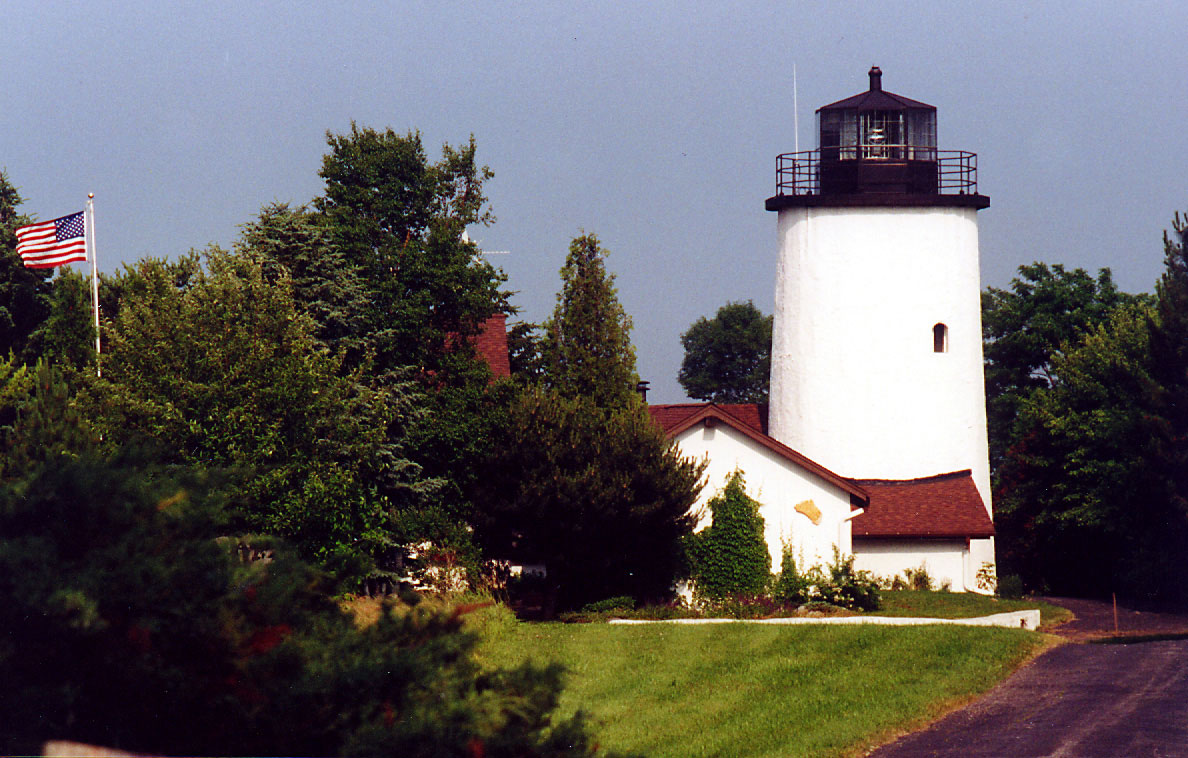
- Kevich Light
- Location: Town of Grafton, Wisconsin, Twenty minutes north of Milwaukee, Wisconsin
- Coordinates: 43°19′23.7″N 87°53′18.5″W

Tower
- Constructed: 1981
- Height: 40 feet (12 m) from on top of bluff, 120 feet (37 m) from lake level

Light
- First lit: 1981
- Focal height: 50 m (160 ft)
- Range: 20 miles (32 km)
- Characteristic: rotating shield causes a 4 seconds on, 4 seconds off effect

The Kevich Light is a lighthouse located in the town of Grafton, Wisconsin.

This lighthouse was built privately by a person who has a general interest in lighthouses. It is built on the former site of the unincorporated community of Ulao, Wisconsin. It is listed on the USCG navigation maps as a private light. In 1990 it was officially registered as a United States Coast Guard Class II Private Aid Light. It is listed as light no. 20765. The light sits on a bluff and is 120 feet (37 m) above the lake level, making it the second highest light on Lake Michigan. Its 1,000 and 400 watt bulbs are surrounded by a rotating shield, resulting in four seconds of light, and then four seconds of darkness. Kevich Light is believed to be one of the last few privately owned lights in the entire United States.
