= Milwaukee Falls Lime Company =

Historic landmark in Wisconsin, US

- U.S. National Register of Historic Places
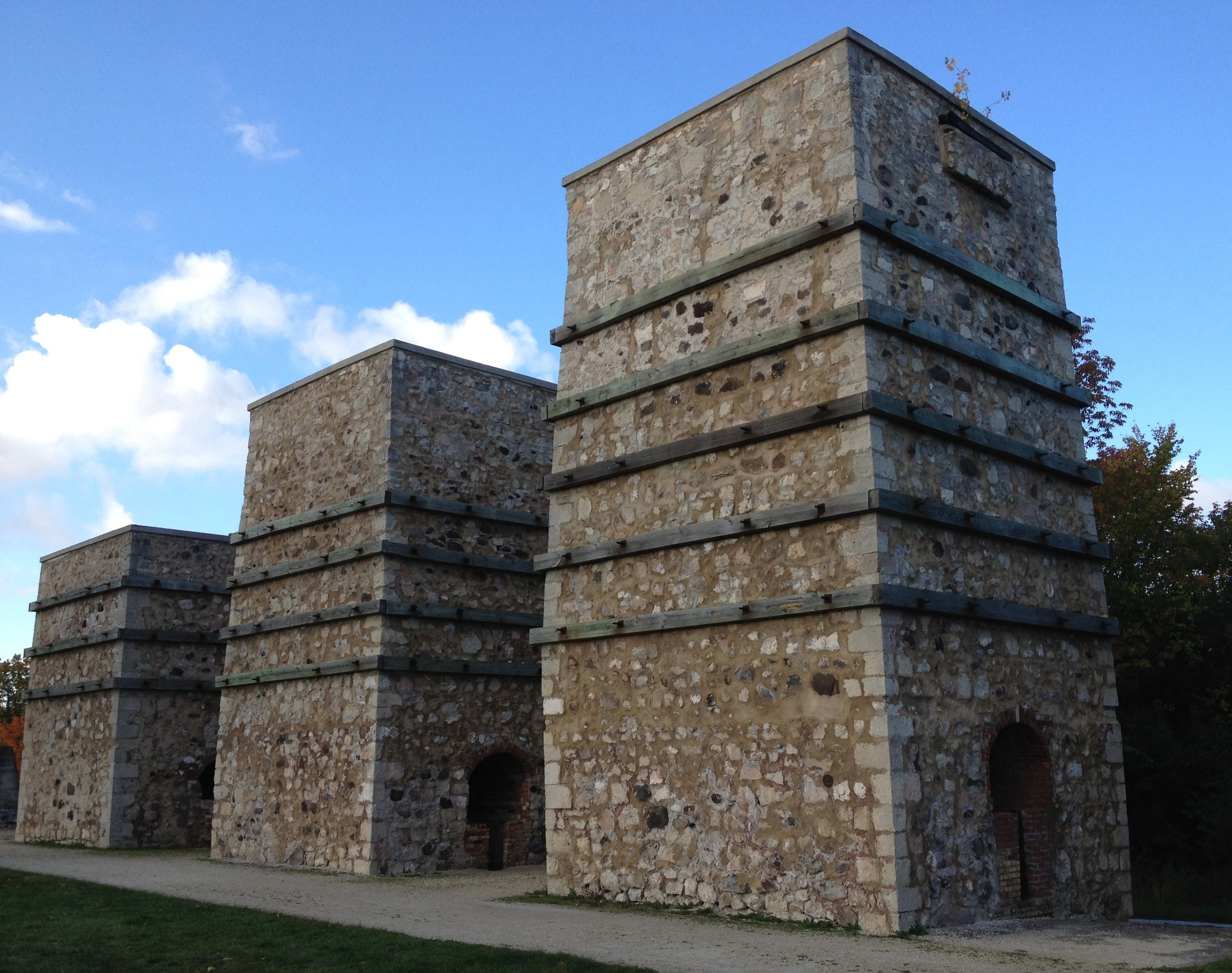
- Milwaukee Falls Lime Company kilns

- Location within Wisconsin
- Location: 2020 Green Bay Rd. Grafton, Wisconsin
- Coordinates: 43.3050°N 87.9555°W
- Built: 1890-1893
- NRHP reference No.: 11001071
- Added to NRHP: January 27, 2012

The Milwaukee Falls Lime Company is the former owner of a limestone quarry and lime kilns located in Grafton, Wisconsin. It was added to the National Register of Historic Places in 2012. The quarry and kilns are now Lime Kiln Park, which also features a pavilion, playground, walking paths, sledding hill, horseshoe pits, and disc golf course.

== History ==
The Milwaukee Falls Lime Company incorporated in 1890, and assumed and expanded operations at the Grafton quarry that had begun in 1845. Between 1890 and 1893, the company constructed five wood-burning lime kilns near the quarry to produce quicklime from the dolomite of the Racine formation found just beneath the top soil along the west bank of the Milwaukee River. By 1900, Wisconsin ranked third nationally in lime production and the company played a major role in the village's economy. In 1915, the company constructed a cement dam on the river to replace an older timber-and-earth dam. The dam's turbine powered equipment that generated power for quarry drills, a tramway, and a stone crusher. In later years, the Tews Lime and Cement Company of Milwaukee purchased the site and managed operations. The lime industry in the United States declined in the 1920s and the Grafton quarry and kilns closed in 1926.

The Village of Grafton acquired the site in the 1960s and worked to convert it into a park. The northernmost pit was used as an incinerator and landfill in the decades following the quarry's closure, which led to some groundwater contamination. In September 1996 the steel truss Bridge Street bridge was relocated from its location over the Milwaukee River to the park. In 2010, the dam was removed, but the mill race was left intact. During the removal process, an archaeological investigation indicated the site's eligibility for listing on the National Register of Historic Places, and the property was listed on the NRHP in 2012.
