= Vaccine tampering incident in Grafton, Wisconsin =

2020 crime in the United States

More than 500 doses of the Moderna COVID-19 vaccine were deliberately spoiled in Grafton, Wisconsin, in December 2020.

== Incident ==
On December 26, 2020, the vaccines were discovered to have been removed overnight from refrigeration. On December 30 the hospital announced that the pharmacist involved admitted to deliberately removing the vials. On December 31 Dr Jay Bahr of Aurora Health Care Medical Group told reporters that after multiple interviews the pharmacist had admitted removing the vials on the nights of December 24–25 and 25–26 and that the hospital had administered 57 of the affected doses before realizing how long they had been at room temperature. Dr Bahr said there was no evidence the pharmacist had tampered with the doses apart from removing them from refrigeration and that those who had been given the affected doses were notified. He said the hospital had consulted with Moderna and been reassured that the spoiled doses would not harm those who received them but that the doses were rendered less effective or ineffective. He declined to comment on the motive of the pharmacist and also said that the pharmacist was no longer working for the hospital.

He said that it was not a result of laxness in protocols but: "It's become clear that this was a situation involving a bad actor, as opposed to a bad process".

== Investigation ==
On December 31 the Grafton Police Department said they had arrested the pharmacist on recommended charges of first degree recklessly endangering safety, adulterating a prescription drug and criminal damage to property, which are all felonies. He is being held in the Ozaukee County Jail. Police were notified of the tampering on December 30, 2020. The Grafton Police Department, Federal Bureau of Investigation and Food and Drug Administration are investigating.

On January 4, 2021, police announced that the pharmacist was "an admitted conspiracy theorist" who believed the vaccine could harm people and "change their DNA". The pharmacist removed the vaccines from refrigeration knowing that it would diminish the effects of the vaccine.

The pharmacist and his wife married in 2012 and his wife filed for divorce in June 2020. In July of that year her lawyer testified that she feared her husband's temper and "vastly different views regarding parenting and views of the world". The lawyer also said "My understanding is that the respondent is more aligned with the feeling of conspiracy theories", and "He has theories about COVID-19. He believes the end of the world is coming. So my client would like him to be out." In December 2020 he told his wife "the world is crashing down around us". She filed for sole custody of their two daughters after she learned that he was under investigation for the incident. On January 4, 2021, the court granted temporary sole custody of their daughters to his wife, finding the children were in "imminent danger of physical or emotional harm".

The criminal court granted the pharmacist release on a promise to pay $10,000 if he did not show up for the next hearing on January 19, 2021. He was also ordered to surrender any firearms, the prosecutor said that police had confiscated some of his guns.

On January 19, 2021, the pharmacist was charged with attempted misdemeanor property damage with prosecutors saying he could face more serious charges if tests showed the doses were ruined.

In February the pharmacist pleaded guilty to two felony counts of attempting to tamper with a consumer product. In June 2021 he was sentenced to three years imprisonment.
