= Barbara M. Joosse =

American children's writer (born 1949)

Barbara M. Joosse (born February 18, 1949) is an American children's writer. She has been writing for children for over thirty years. She has published thirty-eight books for children, both picture books and chapter books. Through her writing, she aspires to find the things that are the same, and the things that are different, between us all. She has toured worldwide to promote her books, which have been translated into twenty-eight languages.

She was born in Grafton, Wisconsin to Robert Elmer (a banker) and M. Eileen Monnot on February 18, 1949. Her first marriage was to Peter Clifford Joosse (a psychiatrist) on August 30, 1969. They had three children: Maaike Sari, Anneke Els, and Robert Collin. Her second marriage was to Charles Thomas Whitehouse (a bronze sculptor) on July 30, 2005. She attended college in Wisconsin, first at the University of Wisconsin--Stevens Point and then received her B.A. at the University of Wisconsin–Madison in 1970. She attended University of Wisconsin–Milwaukee from 1977 to 1980, taking creative writing classes. She is a member of the Society of Children's Book Writers and Illustrators and the Council for Wisconsin Writers.

== Awards ==
Mama, Do You Love Me?

- Golden Kite Award, 1991
- California Children's Book Award, 1992

I Love You the Purplest

- Council for Wisconsin Writers, Archer Eckblad Award

Wild Willie and King Kyle, Detectives

- Austrian Honor Book

Lewis and Papa: Adventure on the Santa Fe Trail

- Nevada Young Reader's Award

Stars in the Darkness

- "Living the Dream" book award, 2002

Nugget and Darling

- Wisconsin Library Association, Outstanding Achievement

== Works ==
- Losers Fight Back: a Wee Willie Mystery, Clarion Books, 1994. ISBN 0-395-62335-9
- Morning Chair, Clarion Books, 1995. ISBN 0-395-62337-5
- I Love You the Purplest, Chronicle Books, 1996. ISBN 0-8118-0718-5
- Nugget & Darling, Clarion Books, 1997. ISBN 0-395-64571-9
- Ghost Trap: A Wild Willie Mystery, Clarion Books, 1998. ISBN 0-395-66587-6
- Lewis & Papa, Chronicle Books, 1998. ISBN 0-8118-1959-0
- Snow Day!, Houghton Mifflin, 1999. ISBN 0-395-96890-9
- Alien Brain Fryout: a Wee Willie Mystery, Clarion Books, 2000. ISBN 0-395-68964-3
- Ghost Wings, Chronicle Books, 2001. ISBN 0-8118-2164-1
- Houseful of Christmas, Henry Holt, 2001. ISBN 0-8050-6391-9
- Mama, Do You Love Me?, Chronicle Books, 2001. ISBN 0-8118-3212-0
- Stars in the Darkness, Chronicle Books, 2002. ISBN 0-8118-2168-4
- Bad Dog School, Clarion Books, 2004. ISBN 0-618-13331-3
- Hot City, Philomel, 2004. ISBN 0-399-23640-6
- Nikolai, the Only Bear, Philomel Books, 2005. ISBN 0-399-23884-0
- Papa, Do You Love Me?, Chronicle Books, 2005. ISBN 0-8118-4265-7
- Dead Guys Talk (a Wild Willie Mystery), 2006, Clarion.
- Wind-Wild Dog, 2006, Holt.
- Please Is a Good Word to Say, 2007, Philomel.
- Grandma Calls Me Beautiful, 2008, Chronicle Books.
- In the Night Garden, 2008, Holt.
- Love Is a Good Thing to Feel, 2008, Philomel.
- Roawr!, 2009, Philomel.
- Friends (Mostly) 2010, Greenwillow.
- Fuzzy Peeps, 2010, Greenwillow.
- Higgledy-Piggledy Chicks, 2010 Greenwillow.
- Sleepover at Gramma's House, 2010, Philomel.
- Dog Parade, 2011, Harcourt.
- Old Robert and the Troubadour Cats, 2011, Philomel.
- Lovabye, Dragon, 2012, Candlewick.
- Hooray Parade, 2013, Viking.
