= Midwest Vert Ramp =

Halfpipe

- Interactive map of Midwest Vert Ramp
- Location: Grafton, Wisconsin, United States
- Established: 2023
- Website: midwestvertramp.godaddysites.com

The Midwest Vert Ramp is an indoor vert ramp and nonprofit based in Grafton, Wisconsin.

== Overview ==
The Midwest Vert Ramp is located in a privately owned barn, which was purchased by Jeremy "Jay" Trasser in 2020. Originally intended as a skateboarding space for Trasser's sons, the ramp was completed in about 10 months starting in 2023 and opened to the public soon after. The ramp is 13.5 feet tall, making it the tallest public half-pipe in North America.

The ramp is maintained by a corresponding nonprofit organization. Entry to the ramp is free, but donations are recommended to assist with associated costs. A fundraiser event, "Barn Bash," is held annually, which includes vendors, live music, and skate competitions.

The ramp has been visited by several pro skaters, including Tony Hawk.

=== Legal issues ===
The ramp has faced local legal challenges. In 2024, the town of Grafton (where the barn is located) sent a cease and desist notice to Trasser, demanding that the ramp "immediately cease all operations," citing safety issues and improper zoning. The town demanded that certain exterior platforms be torn down within 30 days, and that nobody (including Trasser) should be inside the barn or on the ramp in the meantime.

Trasser completed the town-mandated safety work and opened the ramp up to the public once more in 2025, arguing that the ramp didn't qualify as a business because admission was technically free, and that he had acquired the necessary permits to sell alcohol during fundraisers. The ramp remains open as of 2026.
