= Zaunkönig =

Zaunkönig (German for wren, literally "king of the fence") might refer to:

- G7es torpedo, German torpedo in World War II
- Braunschweig LF-1 Zaunkönig, German trainer aircraft
