= Ulao, Wisconsin =

Unincorporated community in Ozaukee County, Wisconsin

- Unincorporated community
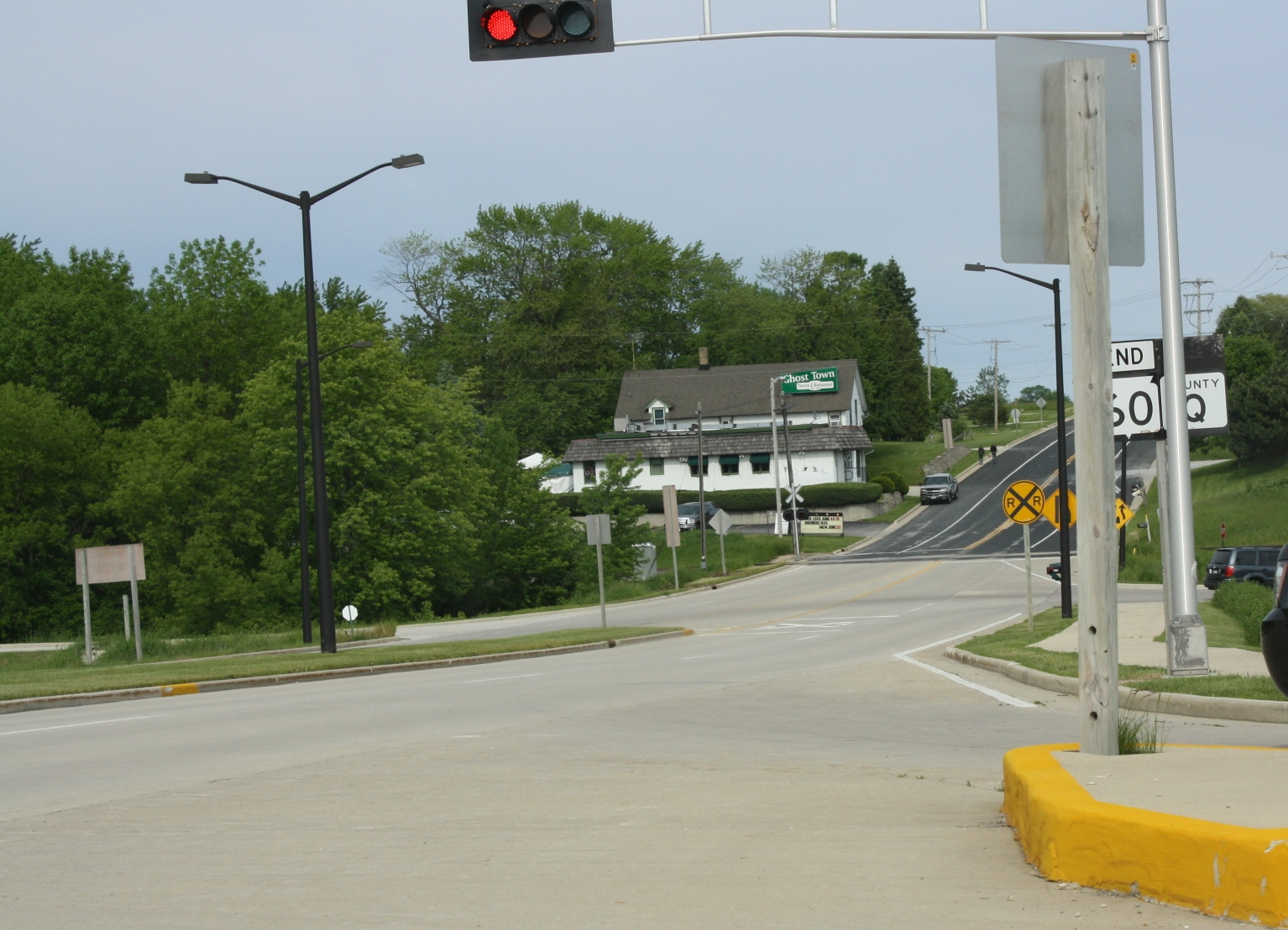
- Looking east at Ulao

- Location within Wisconsin Location within the United States
- Coordinates: 43°19′14″N 87°54′59″W
- Country: United States
- State: Wisconsin
- County: Ozaukee
- Elevation: 689 ft (210 m)
- Time zone: UTC-6 (Central (CST))
  - Summer (DST): UTC-5 (CDT)
- Area code: 262
- GNIS feature ID: 1577866

Ulao (/juːˈleɪˌoʊ/ yoo-LAY-oh) is an unincorporated community in the Town of Grafton in Ozaukee County, Wisconsin, United States. It is located at the intersection of Ulao Road and the old Chicago and Northwestern railroad running from Milwaukee to Green Bay. Today, I-43 runs a few hundred feet to the west of the town. The Ulao Creek flows through the community.

== Toponymy ==
There are several explanations of the community's name. Author Beatrice Krier claims that Ulao is a corruption of the Spanish word Ulloa, which was probably chosen because of a local veteran named Weber, who had participated in the Siege of Veracruz in March 1847 during the Mexican–American War, when U.S. troops under the command of Winfield Scott surrounded and overran the castle of San Juan de Ulúa, which itself was named for the Spanish explorer Francisco de Ulloa, who had navigated the western coast of Mexico as part of the 1539 expedition of the conquistador Hernán Cortés. Other explanations claim that it was named after a Native American leader, that it's a corruption of an American general's French Huguenot name, or that the whistles of the engines of the Northwestern Railroad's pilot engines screamed something akin to "YOU LAY O" as they approached the community's depot.

== History ==
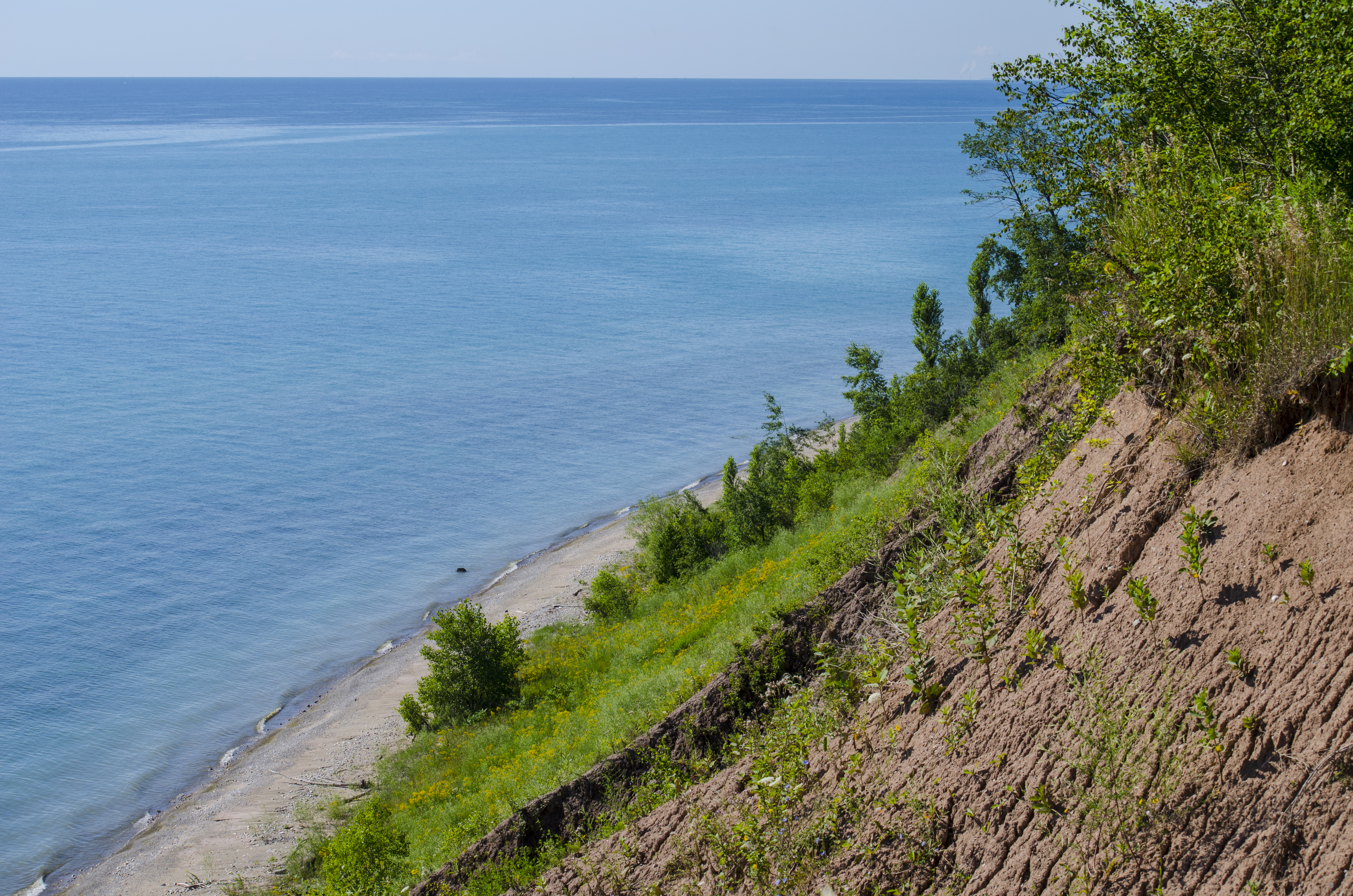
Steep clay bluffs line the shore of Lake Michigan in the Town of Grafton, including the site of Port Ulao.

Ulao's founder was an investor named James T. Gifford, who also founded the city of Elgin, Illinois. In 1847, built Port Ulao on the edge of the clay bluffs on the shore of Lake Michigan, east of the present-day community. At the time, steamships were common on the Great Lakes and burned massive amounts of wood for fuel. A single steamship could consume wood equivalent to several acres worth of forest on single journey. Much of Grafton was primeval beech-maple forest, which settlers were clearing for agriculture, and Gifford saw an opportunity for Ulao to prosper as a refueling station for steamships. He built a sawmill, a warehouse, and a 1000-foot-long pier on the lake where ships docked to buy wood. The steep clay bluffs along the lake can be as high as 140 feet, so Gifford used a chute to transport logs down to the pier.

In 1847, the territorial legislature granted Gifford a charter to build a plank road from Port Ulao west to the Wisconsin River. Only three miles of it were actually built, but this turnpike, now known as Ulao Road, became the basis of today's Highway 60.

In 1856, eight members of the Strangite sect of the Latter Day Saint movement were forced to leave their home on Beaver Island on the Michigan side of the lake and moved to Ulao.

The community prospered in the 1850s and 1860s and had a post office from 1850 until 1864, but by the end of the American Civil War, steamships relied less on wood as a fuel source and Ozaukee County's forests had been largely depleted, forcing Ulao into decline with most of the land being converted to agriculture.

== Landmarks ==
- Kevich Light is located in Ulao.

== Notable residents ==
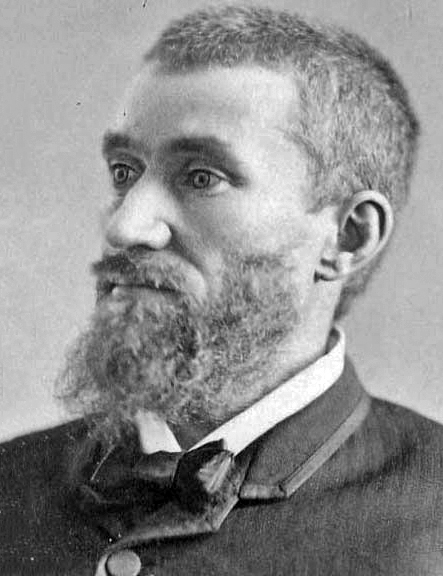
Charles J. Guiteau (1841–1882) assassinated U.S. President James A. Garfield in 1881. Guiteau lived in Ulao during his adolescence.

- Charles J. Guiteau, assassin of U.S. President James Garfield, was the son of Port Ulao's land surveyor and lived in the community from 1850 to 1855.
