= Ralph Zaun =

American politician

Ralph Zaun (December 9, 1920 – June 3, 2010) was an American businessman and politician from Wisconsin.

Born in Grafton, Wisconsin, Zaun graduated from the University of Wisconsin with a doctorate degree. He then served in the United States armed forces during World War II. Zahn was in the banking and insurance businesses. He served in the Wisconsin State Assembly from 1947 until 1951. He died in Mequon, Wisconsin.
