= Lakefield, Wisconsin =

Unincorporated community in Ozaukee County, Wisconsin

- Unincorporated community
- Location within Wisconsin Location within the United States
- Coordinates: 43°17′42″N 87°55′32″W
- Country: United States
- State: Wisconsin
- County: Ozaukee
- Elevation: 709 ft (216 m)
- Time zone: UTC-6 (Central (CST))
  - Summer (DST): UTC-5 (CDT)
- Postal code: 53024
- Area code: 262
- GNIS feature ID: 1567768

Lakefield is an unincorporated community located in the Town of Grafton in Ozaukee County, Wisconsin, United States. Lakefield is located at the intersection of County T (Lakefield Road) and County W (Port Washington Road).

== History ==
Lakefield took its name from the nearby lake and fields.

The Lakefield area was once home to several octagonal barns built by Ernst Clausing, an immigrant from Saxony. Clausing built them in the 1890s.
