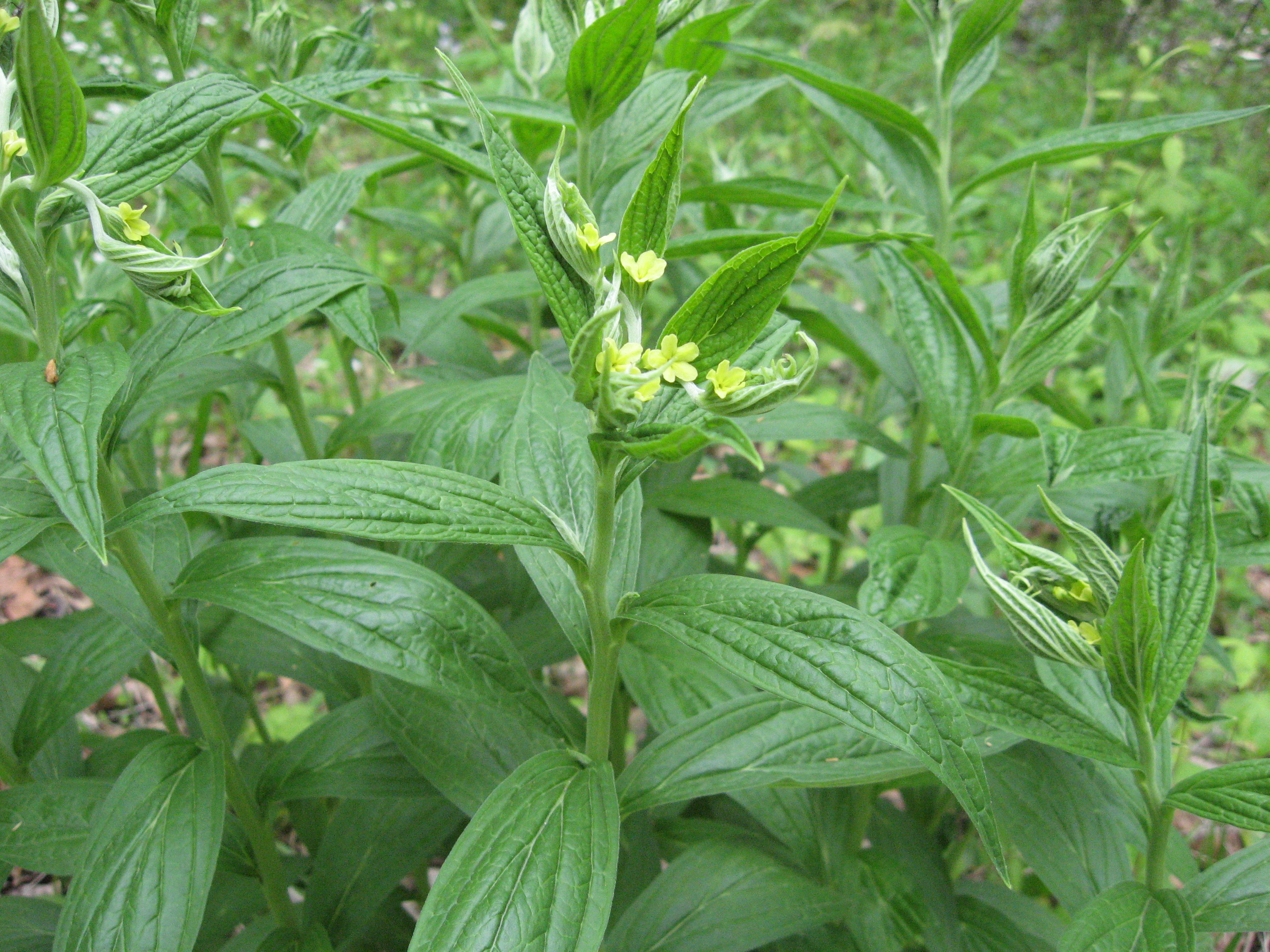

Conservation status
- Apparently Secure (NatureServe)

Scientific classification
- Kingdom: Plantae
- Clade: Embryophytes
- Clade: Tracheophytes
- Clade: Spermatophytes
- Clade: Angiosperms
- Clade: Eudicots
- Clade: Asterids
- Order: Boraginales
- Family: Boraginaceae
- Genus: Lithospermum
- Species: L. latifolium

Binomial name
- Lithospermum latifolium Michx.

= Lithospermum latifolium =

Species of flowering plant in the borage family

Lithospermum latifolium is a species of flowering plant in the borage family known by the common names American gromwell and American stoneseed. Its native range is centered in the Midwestern United States, where it is found in calcareous forests. It is a hairy, tall perennial herb that produces small yellow flowers in late spring.

Lithospermum latifolium is a conservative species that is uncommon throughout its range. It is generally restricted to areas of high quality native vegetation.

Line drawing
