= Milwaukee River =

River in Wisconsin

Coordinates: 43.0256°N 87.9029°W

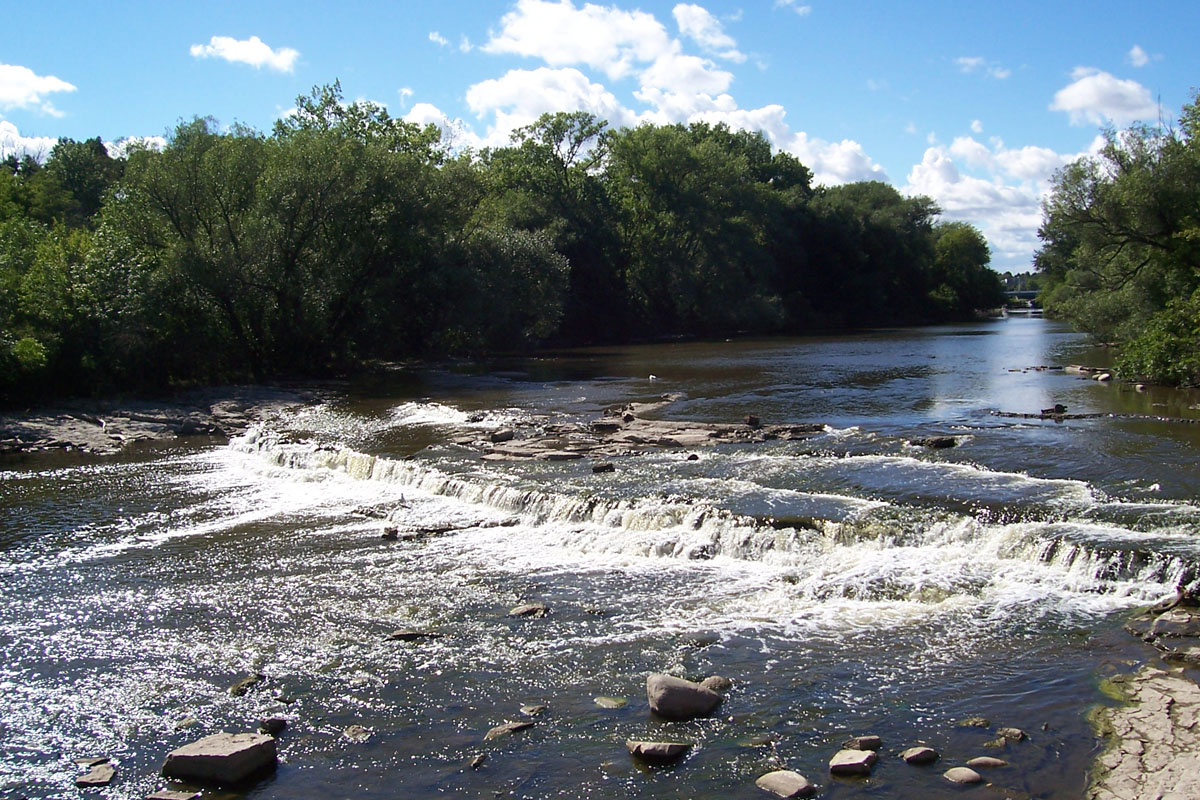
- Dolomite outcropping in Estabrook Park, Shorewood, Wisconsin

Physical characteristics
- Source
  - location: Fond du Lac County, Wisconsin
- Mouth: Lake Michigan
  - location: Milwaukee, Wisconsin
- Length: 104 miles (167 km)

Basin features
- Tributaries
  - left: Cedar Creek, Menomonee River, Kinnickinnic River

The Milwaukee River is a river in southeastern Wisconsin, United States. It is about 104 miles (167 km) long. The river begins in Fond du Lac County, Wisconsin and flows south to downtown Milwaukee, where it empties into Lake Michigan. Its tributaries are Cedar Creek, the Menomonee River, and the Kinnickinnic River.

== Watershed ==
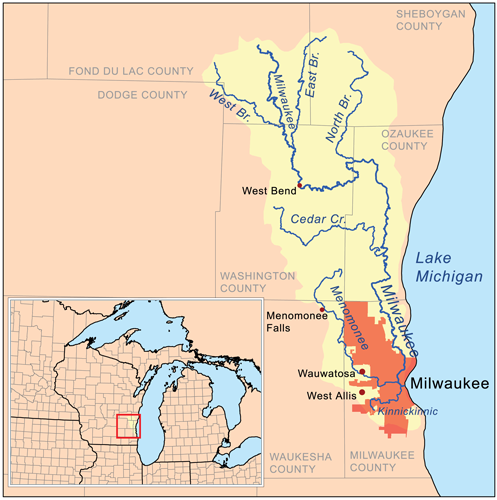
Map of the Milwaukee River watershed.

The Milwaukee River watershed drains 882 square miles (2,280 km^{2}) in southeastern Wisconsin, including parts of Dodge, Fond du Lac, Milwaukee, Ozaukee, Sheboygan, Washington and Waukesha counties.

The Milwaukee River watershed is part of the Lake Michigan subbasin; this subbasin is itself a part of the St. Lawrence River Watershed, which is fed by the Great Lakes.

== History ==
The Milwaukee River area was populated by Native Americans in the time before European settlement. Jacques Marquette and Louis Jolliet navigated from Lake Michigan through the Milwaukee River on their way to the Fox River and the Mississippi. Previously (circa 1834–35) the river had been known as the "Maynawalky", while the present-day Menomonee River was known as the "Milwalky".

In the early 19th century, three towns were formed across the banks of the Milwaukee and Kinnickinnic rivers: Juneautown by Solomon Juneau, Walker's Point by George H. Walker and Kilbourntown by Byron Kilbourn. The quarrel over the formation of a bridge across the Milwaukee River was a key point in the merging of the three towns into the city of Milwaukee in 1846.

Once a locus of industry, the river is now the center of a housing boom. New condos now crowd the downtown and harbor districts of Milwaukee attracting young professionals to the area. The river is also ribboned with parks as it winds through various neighborhoods. Kayaks and fishing boats share the river with party boats. An extensive Riverwalk featuring art displays, boat launches and restaurants lines its banks in downtown Milwaukee.

== Bridges ==
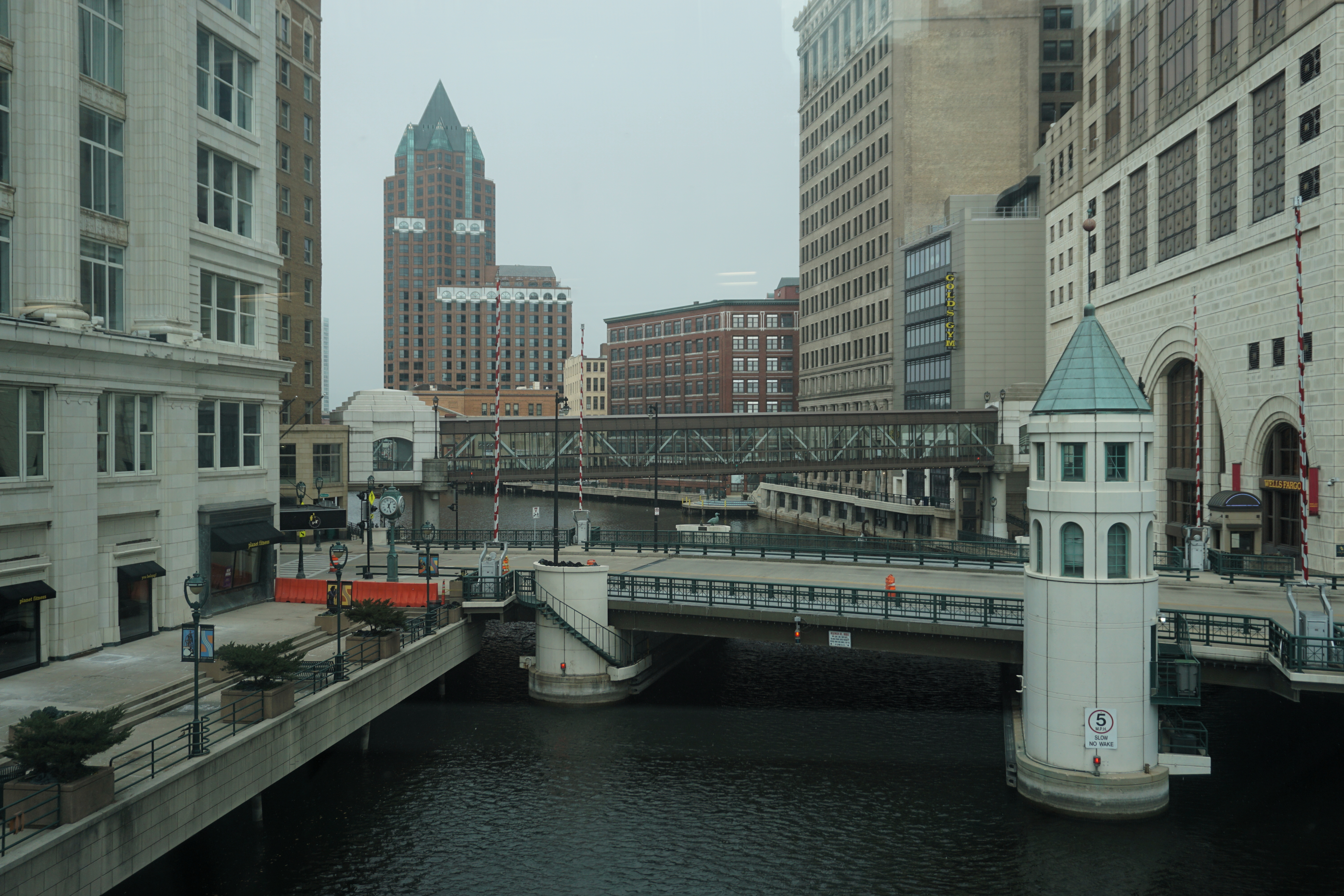
The Milwaukee River as it goes through downtown Milwaukee crossed by the Wisconsin Avenue bridge

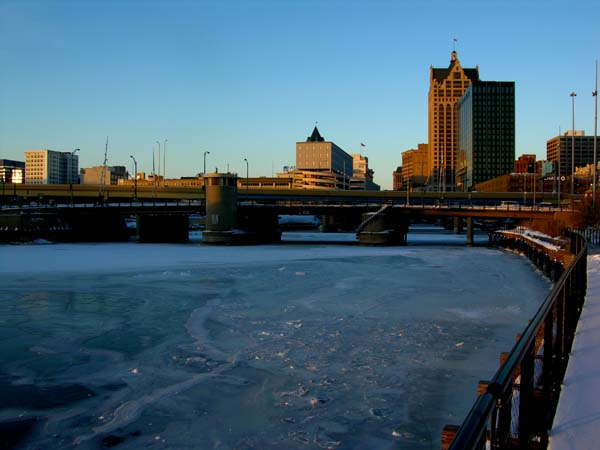
The Milwaukee River frozen over as it is crossed by the Saint Paul Avenue bridge

The Milwaukee River has numerous movable bridges spanning it, allowing for pedestrian and vehicular traffic. These bridges include several different types, including bascule and hydraulically powered table bridges. There are also many fixed bridges, as well as several pedestrian-only and railroad trestles.

The following is a partial list of bridges that cross the river, from north to south:

- Brown Deer Road Bridge
- Range Line Road Bridge
- Good Hope Road Bridge
- Green Tree Road Bridge
- Bender Road Bridge
- Silver Spring Drive Bridge
- Hampton Avenue Bridge
- I-43 Bridge
- Port Washington Road Bridge
- Capitol Drive Bridge
- Locust Street Bridge
- North Avenue Bridge (Milwaukee)|North Avenue Bridge
- North-Humboldt Pedestrian Bridge
- Humboldt Street Bridge
- Holton Street Viaduct (1926)
- Pleasant Street Bridge
- Cherry Street Bridge
- McKinley Avenue Bridge aka Knapp Street Bridge
- Juneau Avenue Bridge
- Highland Avenue Pedestrian Bridge
- State Street Bridge (Milwaukee)|State Street Bridge
- Kilbourn Avenue Bridge
- Wells Street Bridge (Milwaukee)|Wells Street Bridge
- Wisconsin Avenue Bridge
- Michigan Street Bridge
- Clybourn Street Bridge
- I-794 Bridge
- Saint Paul Avenue Bridge
- Water Street Bridge
- Broadway Bridge aka Milwaukee Street Bridge
- Hoan Bridge

There are also several Union Pacific (former Chicago and North Western Railway) railroad bridges crossing the Milwaukee River, including:

- north of Bender Road
- south of Silver Spring Drive
- Railroad Swing Bridge #1556 (1915)

== Parks ==
Public Parks along the Milwaukee River
Parks	Location
Gordon Park, Kern Park, Lincoln Park, Pere Marquette Park, Pleasant Valley Park, Riverside Park	Milwaukee
Kletzsch	Glendale
Hubbard Park, Estabrook Park	Shorewood
Village Park	Thiensville
River Barn Park, Riverview Park, Scout Park, Shoreland and River Forest Nature Preserves	Mequon
Lime Kiln Park, Veterans Memorial Park, River Oaks Park, Grafton Canoe Launch	Grafton
Didier Field, East Riverside Park, Peninsula Park, Ehlers Park, Tendick Park	Saukville
Waubedonia and Marie Kraus Park	Fredonia
Riveredge Nature Center	Newburg
Quaas Creek Park, Riverside Park, Riverfront Parkway	West Bend
River Hill Park	Kewaskum
Columbus Park	Campbellsport

== Dams ==
Current and former dams on the Milwaukee river, from downstream
Name	Municipality	Status	Removal Year
North Avenue Dam	Milwaukee	Removed	1997
Estabrook Park Dam	Milwaukee	Removed	2018
Kletzsch Park Dam	Milwaukee	Active	
Thiensville Dam	Thiensville	Active	
Lime Kiln Dam	Grafton	Removed	2010
Grafton Chair Factory Dam	Grafton	Removed	1999
Bridge Street Dam	Grafton	Active	
Waubeka Dam	Waubeka	Removed	2003
Newburg Dam	Newburg	Removed	2012
Woolen Mill Dam	West Bend	Removed	1988
West Bend	West Bend	Active	
Gadow Mill Dam	West Bend	Active	
Kewaskum Dam	Kewaskum	Active	
Lake Bernice Dam	Town of Ashford	Active	
Campbellsport Dam	Campbellsport	Removed	
Gooseville Dam	Gooseville	Active	

== See also ==
- List of Wisconsin rivers
- Milwaukee Riverwalk
