= Washington Avenue Historic District (Cedarburg, Wisconsin) =

Historic district in Wisconsin, United States

- U.S. National Register of Historic Places
- U.S. Historic district
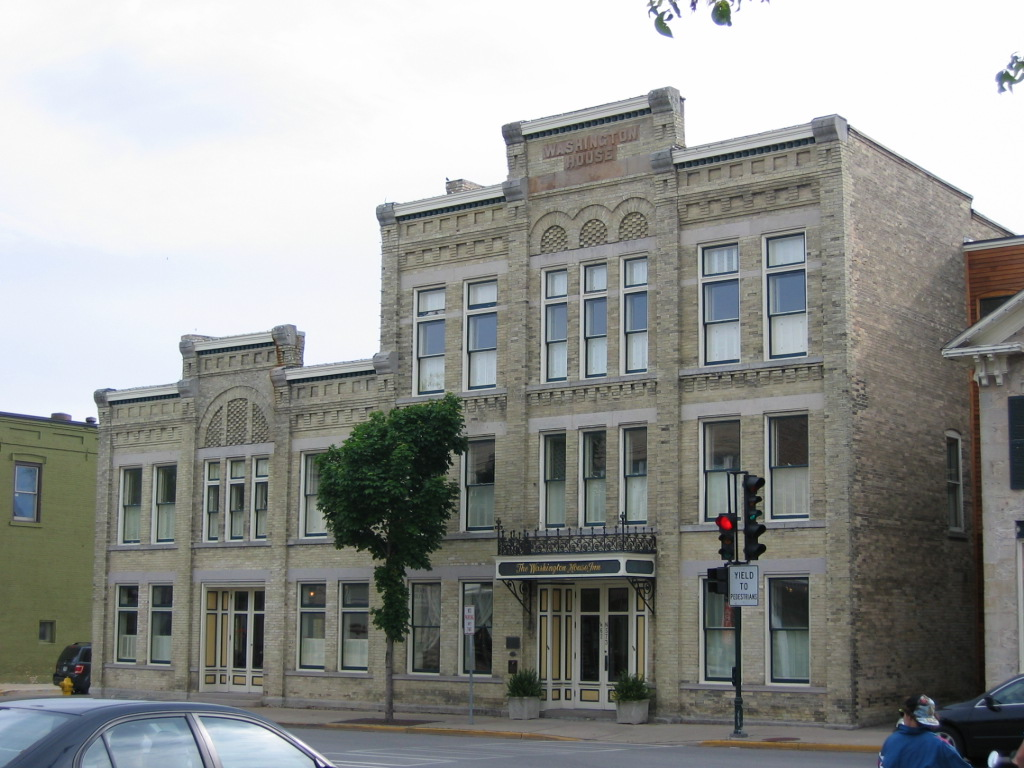
- Washington House Inn

- Location within Wisconsin Location within the United States
- Interactive map showing the location of Washington Avenue Historic District
- Location: Roughly bounded by Elm St., Cedar Creek, Hamilton Rd., and Washington Ave., Cedarburg, Wisconsin
- Coordinates: 43°18′1″N 87°59′16″W
- Area: 28 acres (11 ha)
- Architect: Multiple
- Architectural style: Greek Revival, Italianate, Queen Anne style architecture in the United States. Many buildings are in the Commercial Vernacular style.
- NRHP reference No.: 86000218
- Added to NRHP: January 17, 1986

Washington Avenue Historic District is the historic center of Cedarburg, Wisconsin, the location of the early industry and commerce that was key to the community's development. The historic district was listed on the National Register of Historic Places (NRHP) in 1986.

The district has 80 contributing buildings and one contributing structure in a 28 acres (11 ha) area. Many of the buildings in this district that were built between the 1840s and the early 1900s were built out of locally mined limestone and fieldstone. Of these buildings, many are in vernacular style, but three other architectural styles are represented: Greek Revival, Italianate, and Queen Anne.

The district includes the Hilgen and Wittenberg Woolen Mills and Cedarburg Mill, which are listed separately on the NRHP.

== Background ==
In 1842, Ludwig Groth bought land that would become the village of Cedarburg and in 1844 platted the village. Fredrick Hilgen arrived after 1845 and built a gristmill on Cedar Creek. Over the years, and with business partners, Hilgen also started a sawmill, a planing factory, and a woolen mill. In 1870, the Milwaukee and Northern Railway arrived, opening up new markets. In 1885, the city of Cedarburg incorporated.

== Some Pivotal Buildings ==
The Hilgen and Wittenberg Woolen Mill and the Cedarburg Mill are separately entered in the NRHP. These are also considered "pivotal" by the NRHP nomination:

- The Cedarburg Brewery Complex at W62 N714-730 Riveredge Drive was begun in the 1840s, making it one of the oldest breweries in southeast Wisconsin. The main brewery was built in 1847-48 of locally quarried limestone. The Greek Revival-styled Brewmaster's House also has limestone walls, 18 inches thick and covered with Cream City bricks. The brewery stables and two-story smokehouse also remain. The complex is also known as the Weber family brewery and the Engels and Schaefer brewery.

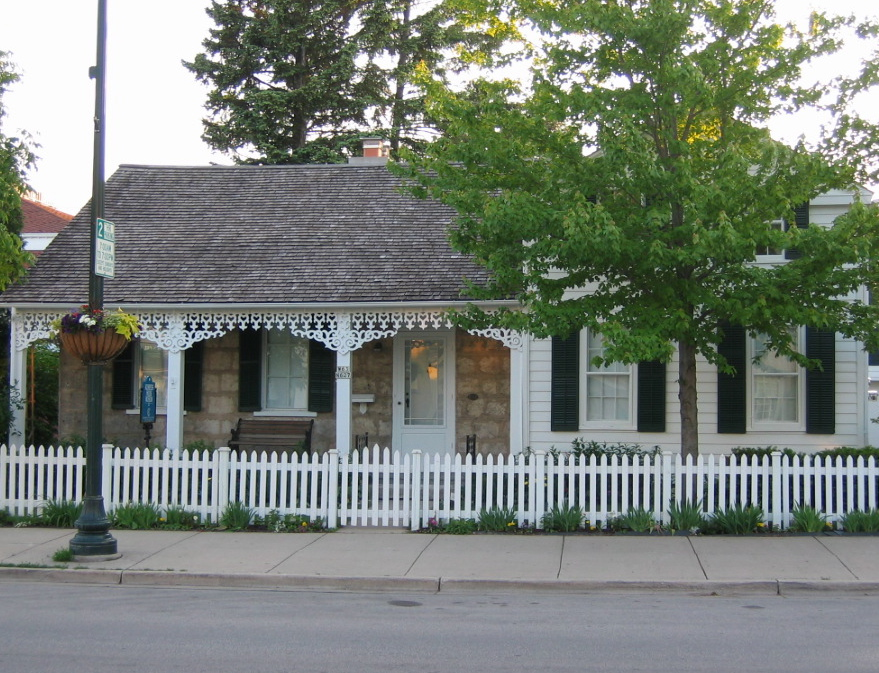
Kuhefuss House

- The ca. 1849 Kuhefuss/Fischer house is one of the oldest houses in Cedarburg. Built in 1849 by George Fisher, the house originally had only two rooms and was made of wood. In 1854, Edward Blank acquired the property. In 1864, he built a limestone addition to the southern part of the house, and his descendants added the front porch. Five generations of the Blank family lived in the house before a member of the Blank family, Mrs. Kuehfuss, donated to the Cedarburg Cultural Center in 1989. The house was remodeled and became a museum in 1990.
- The ca. 1853 Jurgen Schroeder Residence at W62 N589 Washington Ave is a two-story Cream City brick house, in style rather restrained except for the front porch. The porch has chamfered posts, scroll-sawn ornamentation, and cast iron cresting above.
- The 1853 William H. Schroeder Residence at W62 N560-562 Washington Ave is a two-story brick-clad building in Greek Revival style, with matching additions from 1939 and 1965.

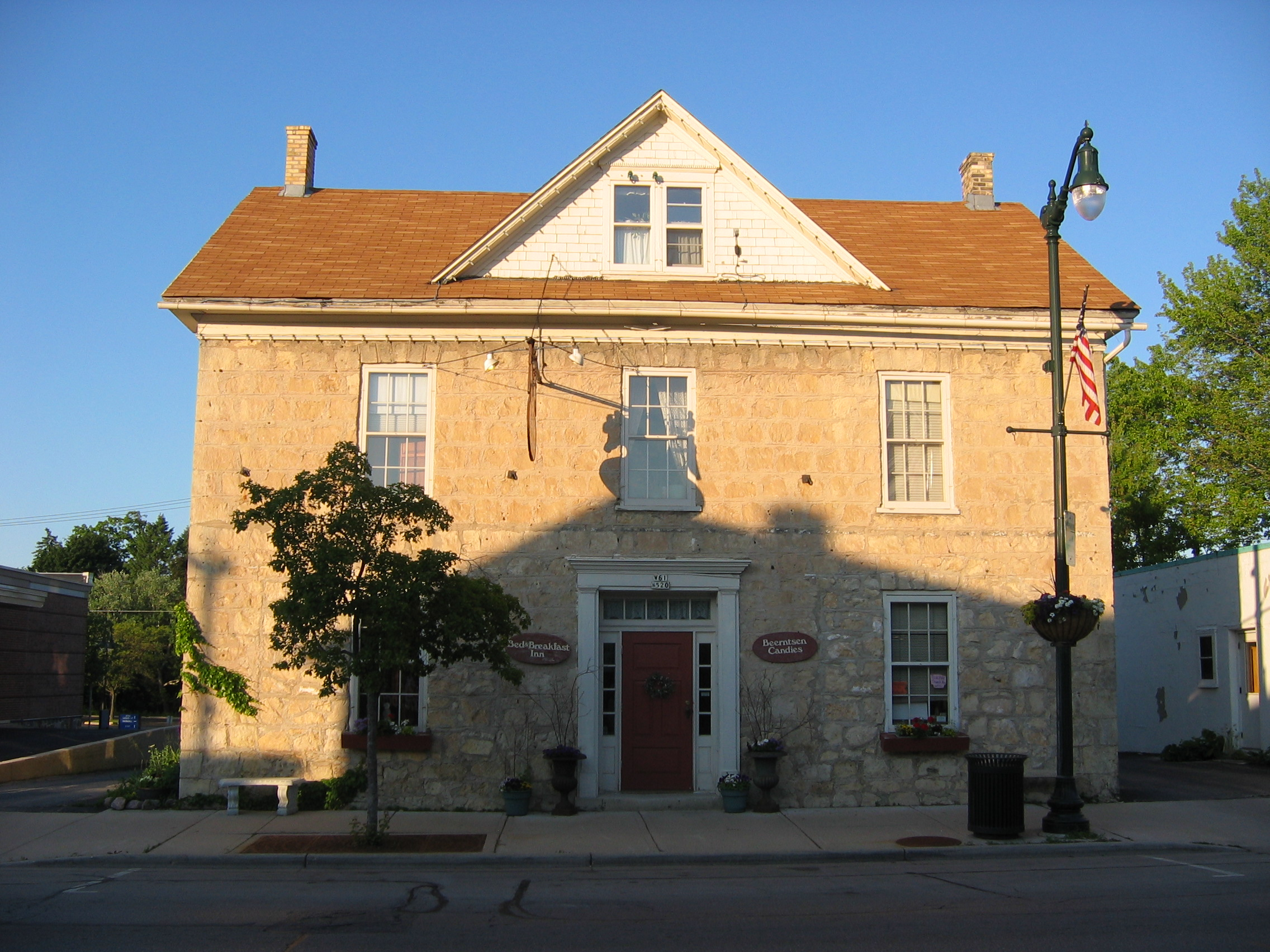
Stagecoach Inn

- The 1853 Stagecoach Inn at W61 N520 Washington Ave is now a bed and breakfast located in the Washington Avenue Historic District. It was built by Henry C. Nero as a stage coach stop on the road between Milwaukee, Wisconsin and Green Bay, Wisconsin. The inn was built in vernacular style from locally quarried limestone. When it was first built, the inn housed a pub and guest rooms and had a stable and blacksmith shop next to it. The inn was restored in 1984.
- The Horneffer Residence/German Free School at W62 N593-595 Washington Ave was originally the home of Colonel Horneffer, who founded the Washington House in 1846. In 1854 he opened the German Free School in his home. The building is loosely Greek Revival style, with walls of rough-cut limestone framed by dressed stone pilasters and lintels.
- The ca. 1860 Stone House Gifts building at W63 N684-686 Washington Ave is Italianate-styled, with walls of laid stone with dressed corner quoins. It was originally built as a residence, but has since been converted to a shop.
- The D. Wittenberg Residence at W64 N707 Washington Ave is a two-story Italianate house built in 1864. Wittenberg was a German immigrant and the president of Cedarburg Woolen Mill.
- The Hendschel and Jochem Building at W62 N575-579 Washington Ave is a two-story building constructed of rough cut stone about 1865. The roof has paired gables, with paired brackets and cornice returns, with a lunette in each gable. Houses Chocolate Factory, as of 2017.
- St. Francis Borgia Catholic Church at N45 W6105 Hamilton Rd is a Romanesque Revival-styled church built of locally quarried limestone in 1870 by the largely Irish Catholic parish.
- Hoehn Furniture Store and Residence at W62 N582 Washington Ave is a two-story cream brick building built in 1870 in Italianate style, with returned cornices and an elliptical window in the gable end. After housing the furniture store, it became the Farmer and Merchants Bank.
- H. Groth's Hardware at W63 N696 Washington Ave is a two-story building with a hip roof. Constructed in 1873 with walls of coursed limestone and Italianate decoration, it initially housed Groth's as a hardware store. In 1880, John Bruss opened a dry goods and grocery store in part of the building.
- Lehmann Bros. Hardware Store at W62 N588A Washington Ave is a three-story Italianate-style limestone-clad commercial building erected in 1874 by C. W. and Julius Lehmann, with cast-iron Corinthian columns and a triangular pediment. The first story housed a hardware store and workshop, the second floor a residence, and the third a meeting hall.
- Hoffmann's Meat Market at W62 N601 Washington Ave is a two-story stone and brick store with hip roof built in 1875. It resembles the Groth building, built two years before. The Hoffmans operated the meat market for a century.
- Immanuel Evangelical Lutheran Church at W61 N498 Washington Ave is a Gothic Revival-styled church built of local limestone in 1882. The steeple tower is buttressed, with a rose window and a 3000-pound bell.
- The Kuhefuss Union House Hotel at W62 N557 Washington Ave was built in 1883 in Italianate style, with arched windows and a corbelled cornice.
- The Conrad Weisler Hotel at W61 N491-493 Washington Ave is an 1885 three-story Queen Anne-styled building with cream brick on the first two stories and the third story clad in shingles. The second floor has an Oriel window.
- The William Schroeder Residence at W62 N591 Washington Ave is a Queen Anne-style house built in 1885. The exterior is covered with different textures of clapboard and wood shingles; other elements include the unusual decoration of the gable and the ogee arch entry to the porch.
- The Washington House Inn at W62 N571-573 Washington Ave is now a 34-room bed and breakfast. The first Washington House was built in 1846 in the same location as the current structure, but was somewhat smaller. The current Victorian style structure was built in 1886 of Cream City brick, with a two-story section and three-story section of similar design, each with pilasters flanking a central bay that leads up to a parapet and cornice. The building was a hotel until the 1920s, when it was converted into offices and apartments. In 1983, the Washington House was made into an inn.
- The Leopold E Jochem House at W63 N675 Washington Ave is a full Queen Anne design built in 1891. It has a two-story bay window, a corner tower, and decorative shingles in the gable. The rounded porch is more classically styled, with fluted columns and denticulated cornice. Leopold operated a general store.

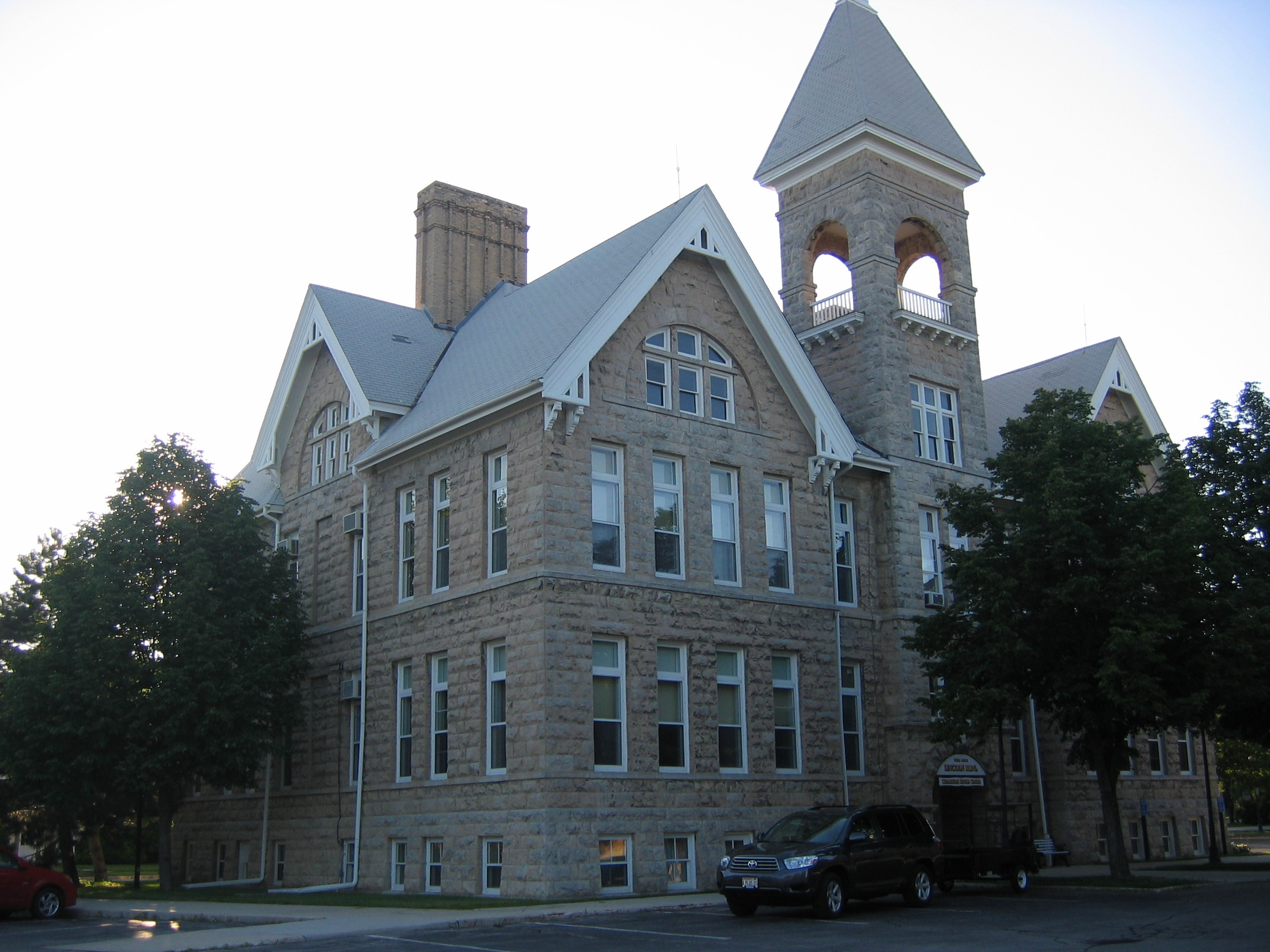
Lincoln Public School

- Lincoln Public School at W63 N643 Washington Ave is a four-story Richardsonian Romanesque building designed by William Hilgen of Cedarburg and built in 1894. It has a five-story tower and frame bargeboards on the gable ends. As of 2017, the building housed the Cedarburg Senior Center.
- The John Nieman Residence at W61 N469 Washington Ave is a three-story red brick home built in 1907 in Queen Anne style, with matching garage.
- The Cedarburg Fire Station, City Hall, Jail at W61 N619-623 Washington Ave was built in 1908 of Cream City brick. Most striking is its five-story hose-drying tower.

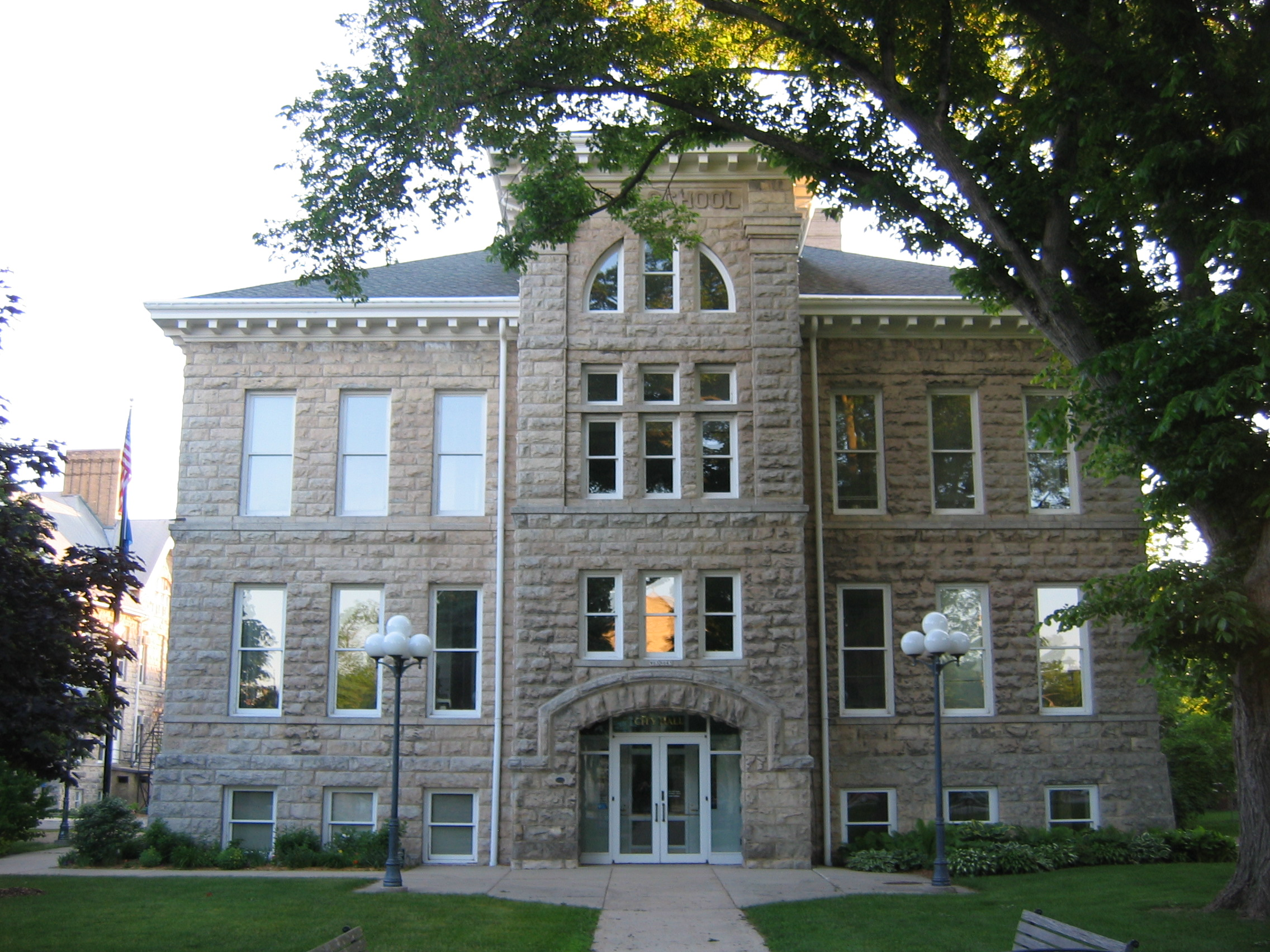
Cedarburg High School

- The Cedarburg High School at W63 N645 Washington Ave is another school designed by William Hilgen and clad in rock-faced limestone. Built in 1908, it has more classical stylings than the Lincoln School mentioned above, with pilasters, modillions, arches, and Diocletian windows. The building houses the city hall.
- John Armbruster Jewelry Store at W62 N620 Washington Ave is a two-story store built in 1908 and clad in terra cotta tile, with two shallow Oriel windows on the second floor.

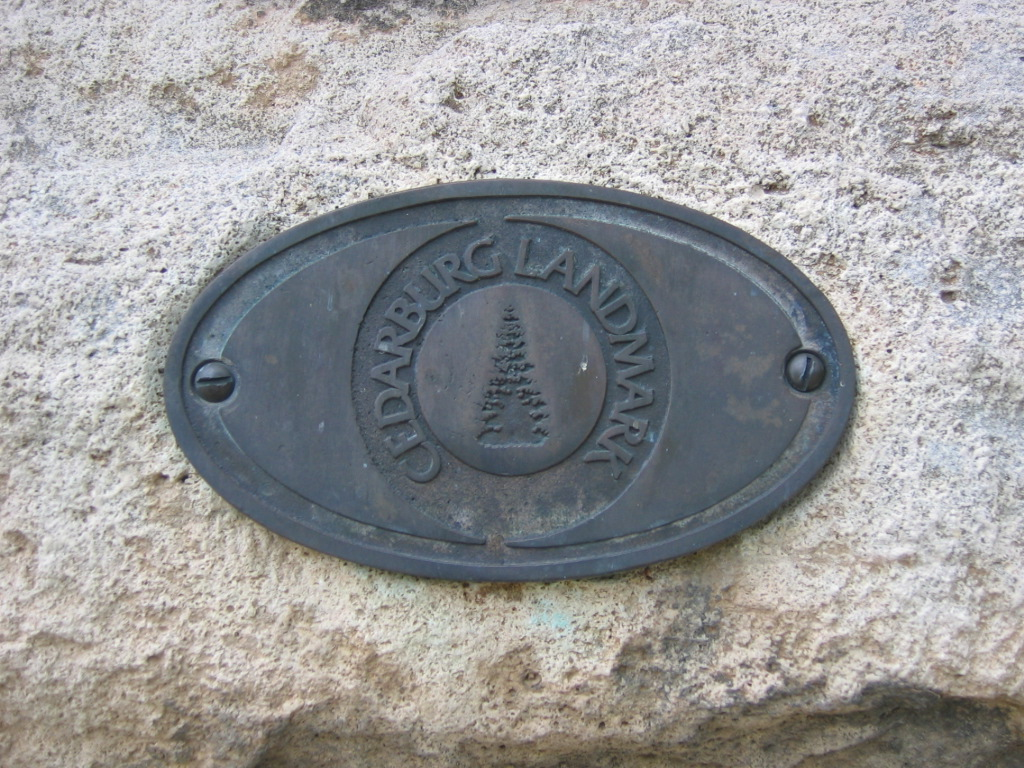
A Cedarburg landmark plaque

- Cedarburg State Bank at W62 N570 Washington Ave is a Romanesque Revival-styled limestone-clad bank built in 1908 by mason John Vollmar and builder Albert Knuppel. This was the first building in Cedarburg built specifically to house a bank.
- Advent Lutheran Church at W63 N642 Washington Ave is a Romanesque Revival-styled church designed by William Hilgen and built in 1909. This was the first English-language Lutheran congregation in the mostly German community.
- Wadham's Filling Station at N58 W6189 Columbia Rd is a small gas station built in 1926. The design, based on a prototype by Milwaukee architect Alexander Eschweiler, suggests a Japanese pagoda.

== Lincoln and Washington Buildings ==
The Lincoln and Washington buildings were built to be used as public schools. The Lincoln building, constructed in 1894, was originally intended to serve grades one through twelve, but as a result of the growing population of Cedarburg, a high school was built near the Lincoln Building. This building, named the Washington Building, was constructed in 1908. The Lincoln Building then only served first through eighth graders. Later the first though fifth graders were moved to the Hacker Building, west and south along the school campus playground. In 1956, when the high school was moved to its current location, grades four and five occupied the Washington Building, and grades six through eight were housed in the Lincoln Building. The grade school complex included a red brick gymnasium facing on Washington Ave. Eventually a new elementary school was built, the Westlawn Elementary School. The middle school, serving sixth and seventh graders, took over the Washington and Hacker buildings and still controlled the Lincoln building and the gymnasium. Sixth graders were taught in the Hacker building. The seventh grade was divided into two groups; one group went to the Lincoln Building, the other to the Washington Building, and students at both schools shared the gymnasium. In 1973, the middle school was moved to Webster Transitional School. The Lincoln and Washington buildings were renovated in 1987. The Washington building is now the Cedarburg City Hall and the Lincoln building is now the Cedarburg Senior Center. The Hacker building is now an apartment complex.
