= List of historical societies in Wisconsin =

The following is a list of historical societies in the state of Wisconsin, United States.

== Organizations ==
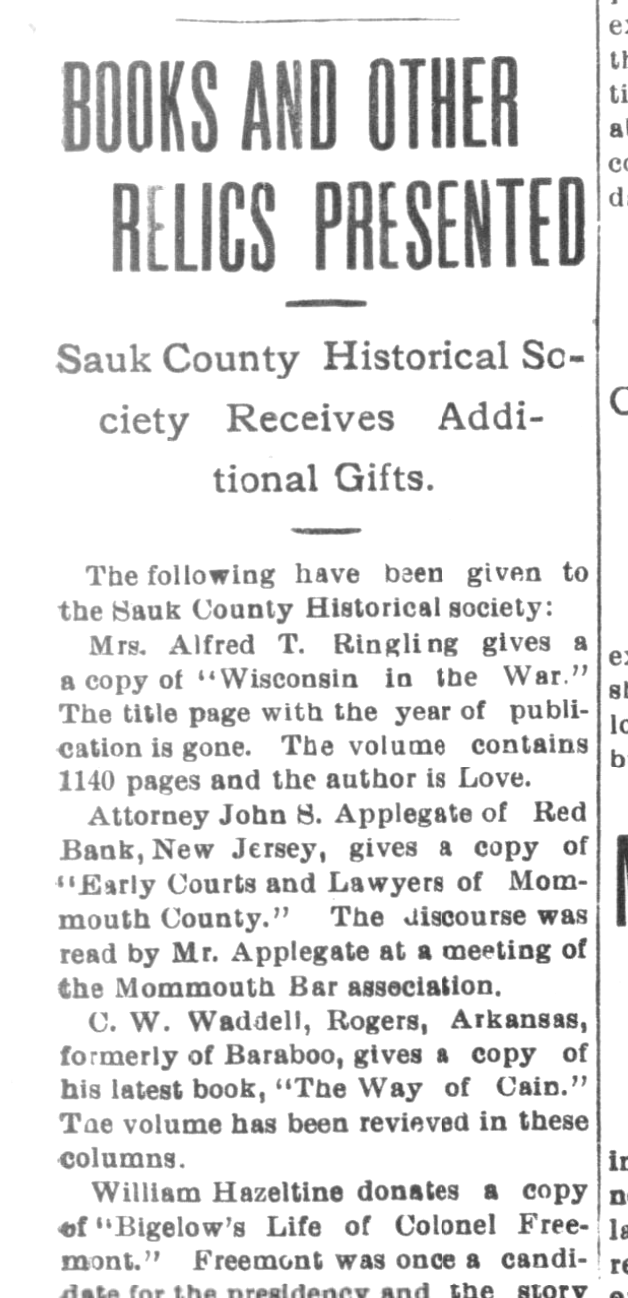
1913 newspaper item about donations to the Sauk County Historical Society in Wisconsin

Cover of The Wisconsin Magazine of History, September 1921, published by the State Historical Society of Wisconsin

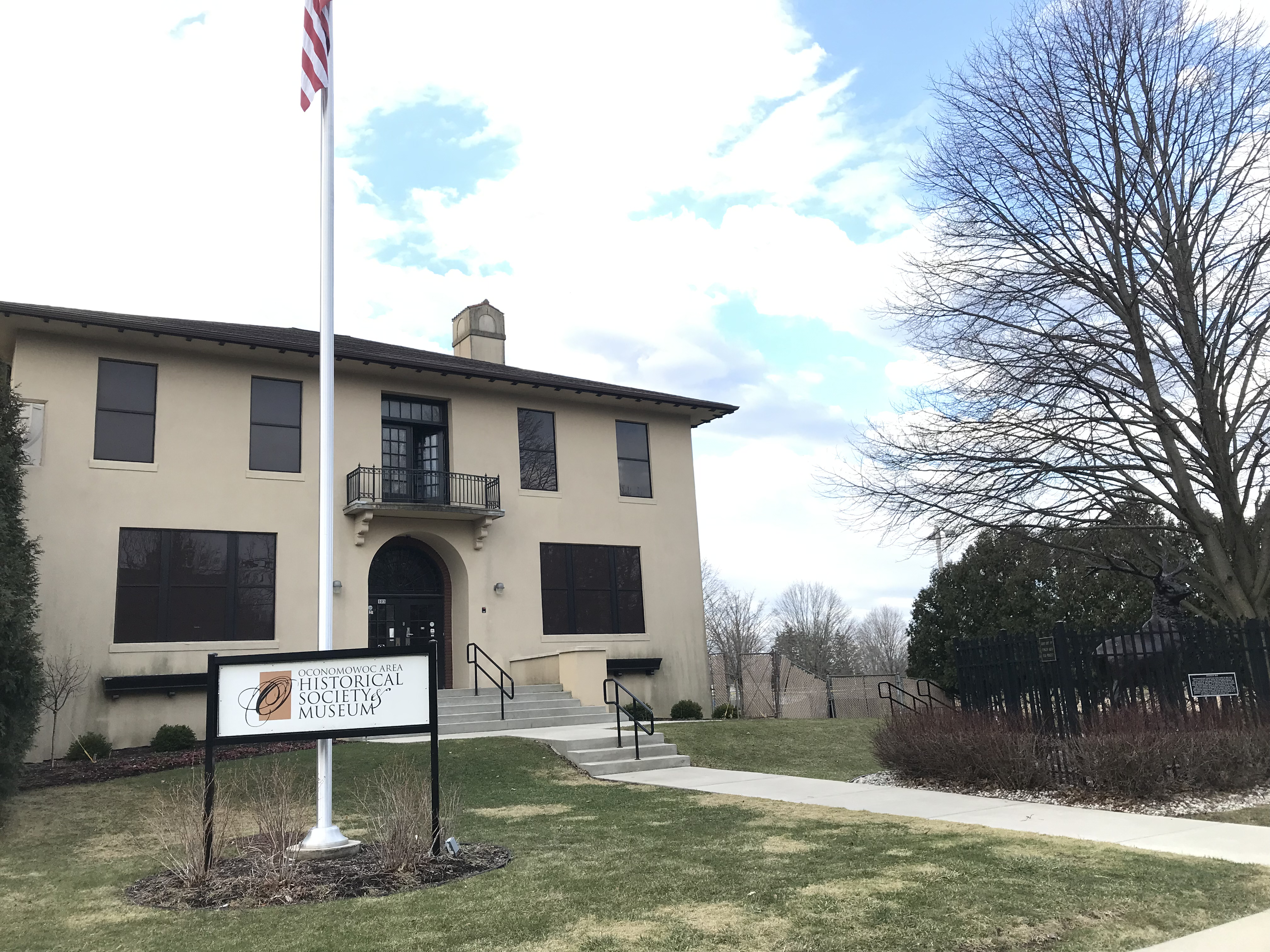
Oconomowoc Area Historical Society and Museum, Wisconsin (photo c.2023)

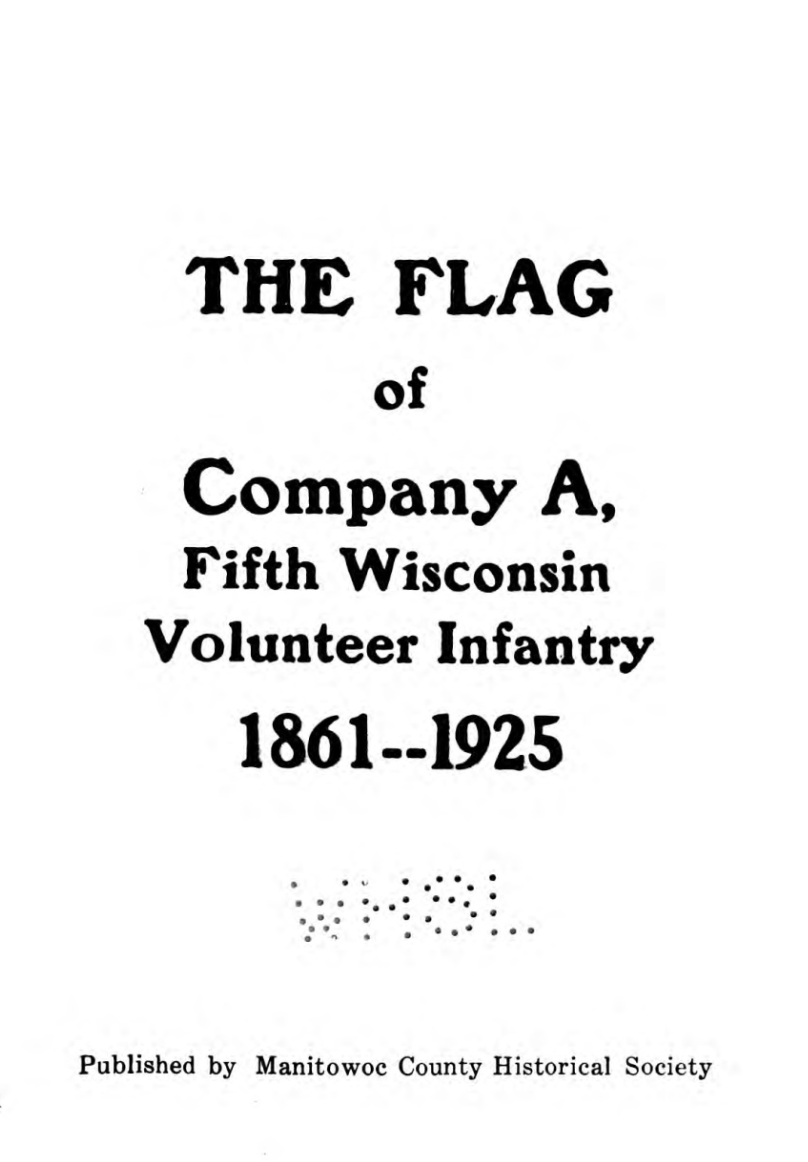
Title page of The Flag of Company A, Fifth Wisconsin Volunteer Infantry, 1861- 1925, published by the Manitowoc County Historical Society, Wisconsin

- Adams County Historical Society
- Albany Historical Society
- Albion Academy Historical Society
- Alma Historical Society
- Almond Historical Society
- Altoona Historical Society
- Amberg Historical Society
- Amery Historical Society
- Appleton Historical Society
- Arcadia Area Historical Society
- Ashland Historical Society
- Ashwaubenon Historical Society
- Badger Historical Society
- Badger History Group
- Baileys Harbor Historical Society
- Baldwin Historical Society
- Bangor and Area Historical Society
- Bark River Woods Historical Society
- Barron County Historical Society
- Bay View Historical Society
- Bayfield County Historical Society
- Bayfield Heritage Association
- Beloit Historical Society
- Berlin Historical Society
- Birchwood Area Historical Society
- Black Earth Historical Society
- Blanchardville Historical Society
- Bloomer Historical Society
- Blue Mounds Area Historical Society
- Bonduel Community Archives
- Boscobel Historical Society
- Boulder Junction Area Historical Society
- Bowler Area Historical Society
- Brandon Historical Society
- Brillion Historical Society
- Bristol Wisconsin Historical Society
- Brodhead Historical Society
- Brooklyn Area Historical Society
- Brown County Historical Society
- Brown Deer Historical Society
- Bruce Area Historical Society
- Buffalo City-Cochrane Area Historical Society
- Buffalo County Historical Society
- Burlington Historical Society
- Burnett County Historical Society
- Byron Historical Society
- Cable/Namakagon Area Historical Society
- Cadott Area Historical Society
- Caledonia Historical Society
- Calumet and Cross Heritage Society
- Calumet County Historical Society
- Cambria-Friesland Historical Society
- Cassville Historical Society
- Cedarburg Cultural Center
- Centreville Settlement
- Cheyenne Settlers Heritage Society
- Chippewa County Historical Society
- Clark County Historical Society
- Clinton Community Historical Society
- Clintonville Area Historical Society
- Coloma Area Historical Society
- Columbia County Historical Society
- Columbus Area Historical Society
- Concord Historical Society
- Cottage Grove Area Historical Society
- Crawford County Historical Society
- Crivitz-Stephenson Historical Society
- Cross Plains-Berry Historical Society
- Cudahy Historical Society
- Dane County Historical Society
- Dartford Historical Society
- De Pere Historical Society
- DeForest Area Historical Society
- Delavan Historical Society
- Dells Country Historical Society
- Dodge Centre Historical Society
- Dodge County Historical Society
- Door County Historical Society
- Dorchester Area Historical Society
- Douglas County Historical Society
- Dr. Kate Newcomb Museum, Woodruff Historical Society & Library
- Dunn County Historical Society
- Eagle Historical Society
- Eagle River Historical Society
- East Troy Area Historical Society
- Egg Harbor Historical Society
- Eileen Area Historical Society
- Eland Area Historical Society
- Elmbrook Historical Society
- Elroy Area Historical Society
- Endeavor Historical Society
- Erin Historical Society
- Evansville Grove Society
- Fairchild Area Historical Society
- Fairwater Historical Society
- Fall Creek Historical Society
- Farmington Historical Society
- Fitchburg Historical Society
- Florence County Historical Society
- Fond du Lac County Historical Society
- Forest County Historical and Genealogical Society
- Forest History Association of Wisconsin
- Fort Atkinson Historical Society
- Fountain City Area Historical Society
- Fox Lake Historical Museum
- Franklin Historical Society
- Frederic Area Historical Society
- Freedom Area Historical Society
- Fremont Area Historical Society
- Friendship Rural School Historical Society
- Genesee Heritage Society
- German Settlement Heritage Society
- Germantown Historical Society
- Gibraltar Historical Association
- Gillett Area Historical Society
- Gilman Area Historical Society
- Glenwood Area Historical Society
- Goodman Historical Society
- Gordon-Wascott Historical Society
- Grant County Historical Society
- Grantsburg Area Historical Society
- Greater Matoon Area Historical Society
- Green County Genealogical Society
- Green County Historical Society
- Greendale Historical Society
- Greenfield Historical Society
- Haese Memorial Village Historical Society
- Hales Corners Historical Society
- Harrisburg-Troy Historical Society
- Hartford Historical Society
- Hawks Inn Historical Society
- Highland Area Historical Society
- Hillsboro Area Historical Society
- Historic Allouez Society
- Historic Blooming Grove Historical Society
- Historical Society of the Upper Baraboo Valley
- Historical Society of Walworth & Big Foot Prairie
- Holmen Area Historical Society
- Horicon Historical Society
- Hortonville Historical Society
- Howard-Suamico Historical Society
- Hustisford Historical Society
- Hyde Historical Territory
- Iola Historical Society
- Iowa County Historical Society
- Iron County Historical Society
- Jackson County Historical Society
- Jackson Historical Society
- Jacksonport Historical Society
- Jefferson Historical Society
- Johnson Creek Historical Society
- Jump River Valley Historical Society
- Juneau County Historical Society
- Kaukauna Area Historical Society
- Kekoskee/Williamstown Historical Society
- Kenosha County Historical Society
- Kewaskum Historical Society
- Kewaunee County Historical Society
- Kiel Area Historical Society
- Knox Creek Heritage Center
- Koshkonong Prairie Historical Society
- La Crosse County Historical Society
- Lac du Flambeau Historical & Cultural Society
- Lafayette County Historical Society
- Lake Mills-Aztalan Historical Society
- Lake States Railway Historical Assn.
- Lake Tomahawk Historical Society
- Land O'Lakes Historical Society
- Langlade County Historical Society
- Laura Ingalls Wilder Memorial Society
- Lebanon Historical Society
- Liberty Grove Historical Society
- Linden Historical Society
- Little Chute Historical Society
- Lodi Valley Historical Society
- Lomira Historical Society
- Lost Lake-Randolph Historical Society
- Loyal Area Historical Society
- Luck Area Historical Society
- Luther Valley Historical Society
- Luxembourg American Cultural Society
- Manitowish Waters Historical Society
- Manitowoc County Historical Society
- Marathon County Historical Society
- Marinette County Historical Society
- Marion Area Historical Society
- Markesan Historical Society
- Marquette County Historical Society
- Marquette Historical Society
- Marshall Area Historical Society
- Mason Area Historical Society
- Mayville Historical Society
- Mazomanie Historical Society
- McFarland Historical Society
- Mellen Area Historical Society
- Menasha Historical Society
- Menomonee Falls Historical Society
- Mequon Thiensville Historical Society
- Mercer Area Historical Society
- Merrill Historical Society
- Mid-Continent Railway Historical Society
- Middleton Area Historical Society
- Millston Historical Society
- Milton Historical Society
- Milwaukee County Historical Society
- Milwaukee Schools Historical Society
- Mineral Point Historical Society
- Mondovi Area Historical Society
- Monroe County Historical Society
- Monticello Area Historical Society
- Moquah Heritage Society
- Mosinee Area Historical Society
- Mount Horeb Area Historical Society
- Mountain Historical Society
- Mukwonago Historical Society
- Muskego Historical Society
- Neenah Historical Society
- New Berlin Historical Society
- New Glarus Historical Society
- New Holstein Historical Society
- New London Heritage Historical Society
- Niagara Area Historical Society
- Nichols Area Historical Society
- Norskedalen Nature & Heritage Center
- North Prairie Historical Society
- North Wisconsin Historical Society (est. 1898)
- North Wood County Historical Society
- Norway Historical Society
- Oak Creek Historical Society
- Oakfield Area Historical Society
- Oconomowoc Historical Society
- Oconto County Historical Society
- Old Franklin Township Historical Society
- Old-Brule Heritage Society
- Omro Area Historical Society
- Onalaska Area Historical Society
- Oregon Area Historical Society
- Osceola Historical Society
- Osseo Historical Society
- Oulu Historical Society
- Outagamie County Historical Society
- Ozaukee County Historical Society
- Palmyra Historical Society
- Pepin County Historical Society
- Peshtigo Historical Society
- Pewaukee Area Historical Society
- Pierce County Historical Association
- Pittsville Area Historical Society
- Pleasant Prairie Historical Society
- Plymouth Historical Society
- Polk County Historical Society
- Port Washington Historical Society
- Portage County Historical Society
- Portage Historical Society
- Poynette Area Historical Society
- Prairie du Chien Historical Society
- Presque Isle Heritage Society
- Price County Historical Society
- Princeton Historical Society
- Pulaski Area Historical Society
- Random Lake Area Historical Society
- Reedsburg Area Historical Society
- Rhinelander Historical Society
- Richfield Historical Society
- Richland County Historical Society
- Rio Area Historical Society
- Ripon Historical Society
- Rochester Area Historical Society
- Rock County Historical Society
- Rock River Thresheree www.thresheree.org
- Rosendale Historical Society
- Rural Historical Society
- Rusk County Historical Society
- Sauk County Historical Society
- Sauk Prairie Area Historical Society
- Saukville Area Historical Society
- Sawyer County Historical Society
- Seymour Community Historical Society
- Shawano County Historical Society
- Sheboygan County Historical Research Center
- Sheboygan County Historical Society
- Shorewood Historical Society
- Sister Bay Historical Society
- Solon Springs Historical Society
- South Milwaukee Historical Society
- South Wood County Historical Corporation
- St. Croix County Historical Society
- St. Croix Falls Historical Society
- St. Francis Historical Society
- St. Nazianz Area Historical Society
- Stanley Area Historical Society
- Sterling Eureka Laketown Historical Society
- Sterling North Society, Ltd.
- Stone Lake Area Historical Society
- Stoughton Historical Society
- Stratford Area Historical Society
- Suring Area Historical Society
- Sussex-Lisbon Area Historical Society
- Taylor County Historical Society
- Theodore Robinson Society
- Theresa Historical Society
- Thorp Area Historical Society
- Three Lakes Historical Society
- Tigerton Area Historical Society
- Tomah Area Historical Society
- Tomahawk Area Historical Society
- Tomorrow River Valley Historical Society
- Town 25 North Historical Society
- Town of Kaukauna Historical Society
- Town of Sullivan Historical Society
- Trempealeau Community Heritage Society
- Trempealeau County Historical Society
- Two Rivers Historical Society
- Venerable Fire Collection
- Vermont Essex County - Island Pond Historical Society
- Vermont Essex County - Norton Historical Society
- Vernon County Historical Society
- Verona Area Historical Society
- Vilas County Museum & Historical Society
- Waldemar Ager Association
- Walworth County Historical Society
- Washburn Area Historical Society
- Washburn County Historical Society
- Washington County Historical Society
- Waterloo Area Historical Society
- Watertown Historical Society
- Waukesha County Historical Society & Museum
- Waukesha Engine Historical Society
- Waupaca Historical Society
- Waupun Historical Society
- Waushara County Historical Society
- Wauwatosa Historical Society
- West Allis Historical Society
- West Milwaukee Historical Society
- West Salem Historical Society
- Westby Area Historical Society
- Western Bayfield County Historical Society
- Western Kenosha County Historical Society
- Weyauwega Area Historical Society
- White Lake Area Historical Society
- Whitefish Bay Historical Society
- Whitewater Historical Society
- Wild Rose Historical Society
- Willard Historical Society
- Williams Bay Historical Society
- Winchester Area Historical Society
- Winnebago County Historical and Archeological Society
- Winneconne Historical Society
- Wisconsin Black Historical Society
- Wisconsin Chapter-National Railway Historical Society
- Wisconsin Chapter-Society of Automotive Historians
- Wisconsin Freewill Baptist Historical Society
- Wisconsin Historical Society
- Wisconsin Labor History Society
- Wisconsin Marine Historical Society
- Wisconsin Postal Historical Society
- Wisconsin Pottery Association
- Wisconsin Slovak Historical Society
- Wisconsin State Genealogical Society
- Wittenberg Area Historical Society
- Woodville Historical Society Museum
- Wrightstown Historical Society

== See also ==
- History of Wisconsin
- List of museums in Wisconsin
- National Register of Historic Places listings in Wisconsin
- List of historical societies in the United States
