= Edna Scheer =

- Pitcher
- Born: November 4, 1926; Cedarburg, Wisconsin, U.S.
- Died: April 25, 2000 (aged 73); Cedarburg, Wisconsin, U.S.
- Batted: Right Threw: Right

Teams
- Rockford Peaches (1950)

Career highlights and awards
- Championship team (1950); Women in Baseball – AAGPBL Permanent Display at Baseball Hall of Fame and Museum (1988)

Edna H. Scheer (November 4, 1926 – April 25, 2000) was a pitcher who played in the All-American Girls Professional Baseball League (AAGPBL). Listed at 5 ft 5 in (1.65 m), 104 lb., Scheer batted and threw right-handed. She was born in Cedarburg, Wisconsin.

Edna Scheer played briefly for the Rockford Peaches during the 1950 season.

״Bunny״, as her teammates called her, collected a 3–1 record in 71 innings of work as a reliever and spot starter, helping her team win the pennant and championship title. A highly disciplined hitter as well, she posted a slash line (BA/OBP/SLG) of .286/.375/.321.

After her baseball days, Scheer became an owner/partner in restaurant business.

Since 1988 she is part of Women in Baseball, a permanent display based at the Baseball Hall of Fame and Museum in Cooperstown, New York, which was unveiled to honor the entire All-American Girls Professional Baseball League.

Scheer died in her hometown of Cedarburg at the age of 73. She is buried at Zur Ruhe Cemetery in Ozaukee County, Wisconsin.

== Career statistics ==
Pitching

GP	W	L	W-L%	ERA	IP	H	RA	ER	BB	SO	WHIP
18	3	1	.750	5.58	71	63	52	44	66	21	1.82

Batting

GP	AB	R	H	2B	3B	HR	RBI	SB	TB	BB	SO	BA	OBP	SLG
18	28	5	8	1	0	0	1	0	9	4	11	.286	.375	.321

Fielding

GP	PO	A	E	TC	DP	FA
18	2	15	3	20	0	.842
