= Marathon County Historical Museum =

Historic house in Wisconsin, United States

- Cyrus C. Yawkey House
- U.S. National Register of Historic Places
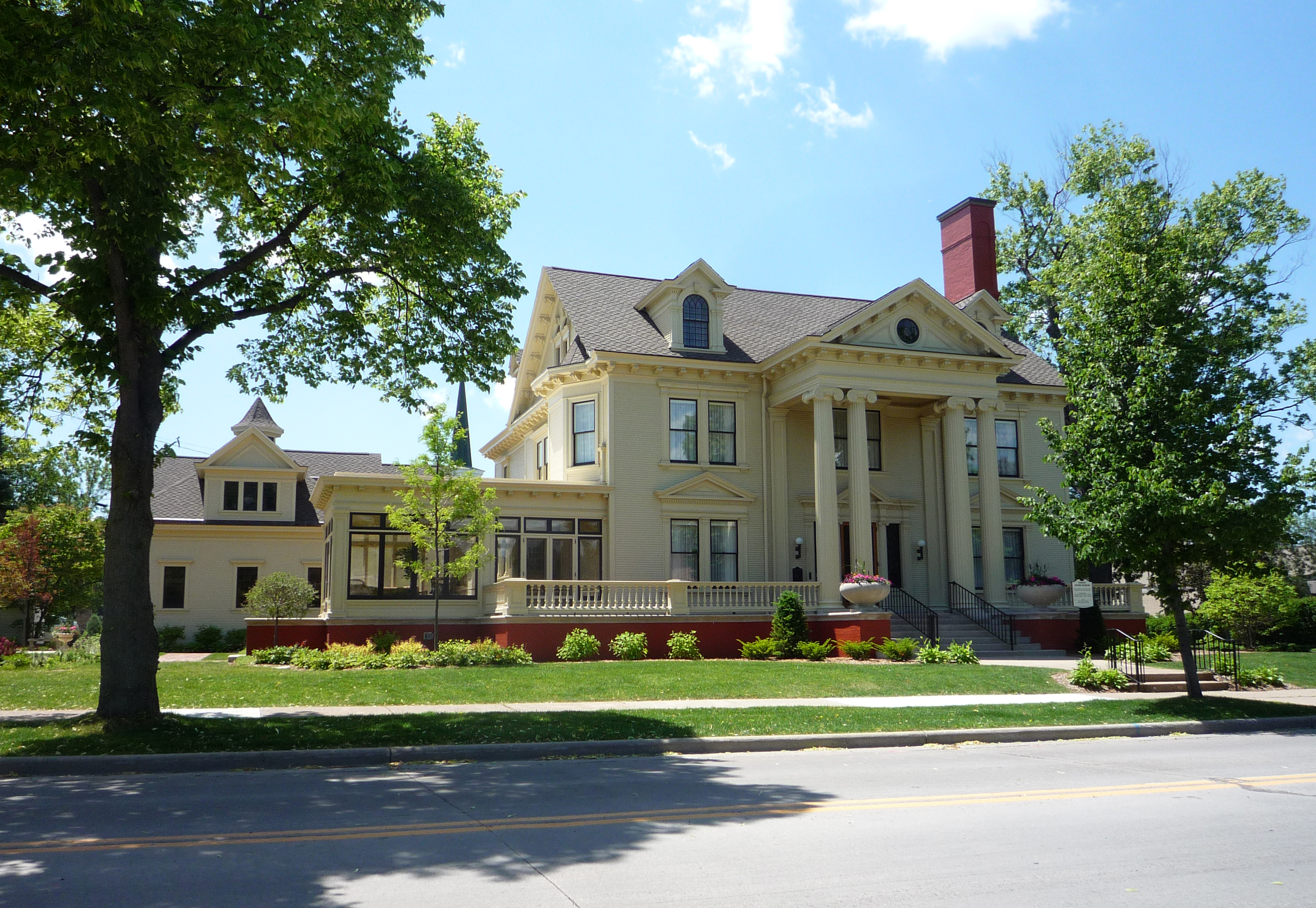

- Location within Wisconsin Location within the United States
- Location: 403 McIndoe St., Wausau, Wisconsin
- Coordinates: 44°57′49″N 89°37′35″W
- Area: less than one acre
- Built: 1900
- Architect: George Maher/Van Ryn & Degelleke
- Architectural style: Classical Revival
- NRHP reference No.: 74000098
- Added to NRHP: December 31, 1974

The Yawkey House History Museum is museum located in Wausau, Marathon County, Wisconsin, United States. It is the Cyrus Carpenter Yawkey House, a house listed on the National Register of Historic Places in 1974. The house is a significant example of Classical Revival architecture.

== Yawkey ==
The house was the home of prominent citizen, Cyrus C. Yawkey. Yawkey was a co-owner of a firm in Saginaw, Michigan, before moving to Wausau to purchase large tracts of land for lumber. He later owned numerous local businesses, was a member of the Wisconsin Legislature, and led the Wausau Group, which invested in new businesses like paper mills around Wausau as pine timber dwindled.

The house was built in 1900 to 1901, designed in Beaux-Arts Classical style by Van Ryn & DeGelleke of Milwaukee. Six years later Yawkey hired prominent Prairie School architect George W. Maher to remodel the house. He remodeled the first floor interior in a style closer to Prairie School, added a sun porch, and added two stories to the back of the structure. Yawkey died in 1943. His wife Alice lived in the house until she died in 1953. Their daughter, philanthropist Leigh Yawkey Woodson, donated the house to the Marathon County Historical Society.

== Museum ==
The first floor contains the foyer, living room, dining room, Cyrus's office, a sun porch, and the ladies' parlor with authentic furniture from the beginning of the 20th century. There is also a kitchen with a back staircase, a pantry and former servants' dining room, and a half bath. The second floor contains the Yawkey's bedroom (with an attached bathroom), Leigh's bedroom (with attached sitting room and bathroom), a guest room, another bedroom, a servant's bedroom, and an additional bath off the main upstairs hallway. The staircase features large, stained-glass windows. Cyrus's den, part of Leigh's suite, the sun porch, and the small bump out which was built onto the dining room, all designed by George Maher, were added eight years after the Yawkeys moved in. On the third floor are servants' bedrooms, a bathroom, and a ballroom. There are formal gardens on the grounds and a carriage house with servant's quarters above. The house was restored to near original condition in the early 2000s.

== Museum library ==
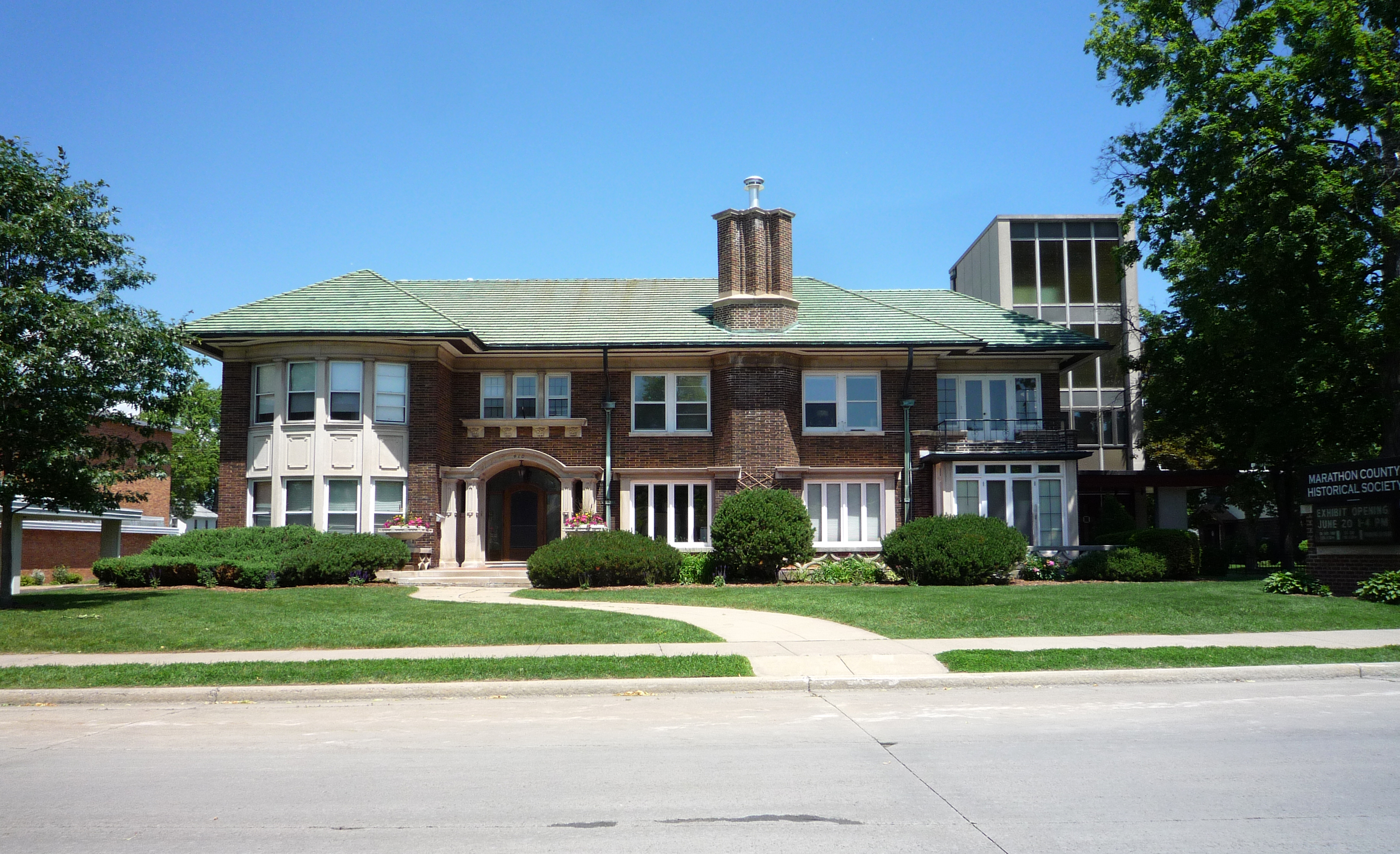
Woodson mansion

The Marathon County Historical Museum Library is located across the street at the Woodson mansion. The Woodson mansion, designed by architect George W. Maher, was the home of Leigh Yawkey Woodson and her husband Aytchmonde Perrin Woodson. The library contains information about the history of the county.

== Historic district ==
The houses are part of the Andrew Warren Historic District, which contains 62 historic buildings, mainly homes.

== See also ==
- List of historical societies in Wisconsin
