= PartsBadger =

American online machining company

- Company type: Private
- Industry: Manufacturing · Precision machining · CNC machining
- Founded: 2016
- Founders: Roy Dietsch · Jimmy Crawford
- Headquarters: Cedarburg, Wisconsin, United States
- Area served: United States
- Key people: Roy Dietsch (CEO)
- Products: Custom CNC parts
- Services: Online quoting and ordering of machined components

PartsBadger is an online machining company based in Cedarburg, WI, which provides custom CNC parts for various industries. The company was co-founded by Roy Dietsch and Jimmy Crawford in 2016.

== History ==
PartsBadger was established in 2016 as a tech-manufacturing hybrid. The company was initially located in Mequon, WI, then moved headquarters to Cedarburg, WI. The company is headed by CEO Roy Dietsch.

The company partnered with a mountain bike manufacturer, Yeti Cycles, on a five-year project valued at up to $13.8 million. PartsBadger purchased $1.6 million in new machinery and directing an estimated $3.7 million to local distributors for material, tooling, and plating services.

In 2021, the company was included in the Inc. 5000 list as the 525th fastest-growing company in the United States, ranking 23rd in manufacturing and 8th overall in Wisconsin.
