= Amberg Historical Museum Complex =

Museum in Wisconsin

Coordinates: 45.50254°N 87.99474°W

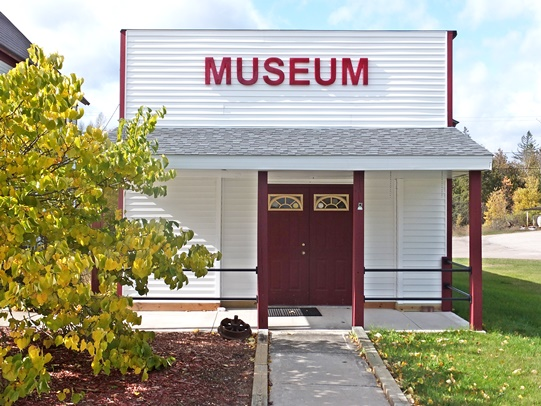
The Amberg Historical Museum

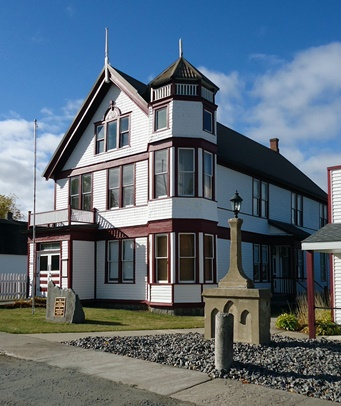
Historic 1894Amberg Town Hall

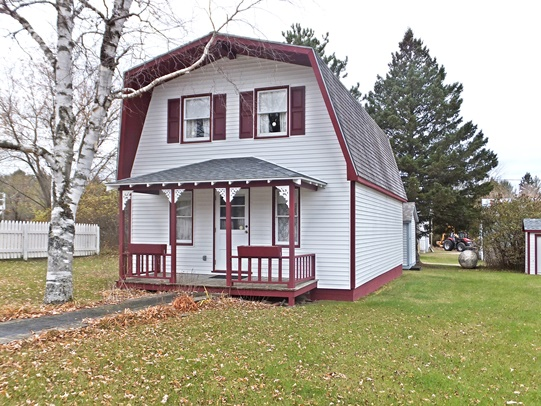
The Amberg Historical Museum Complex Old House

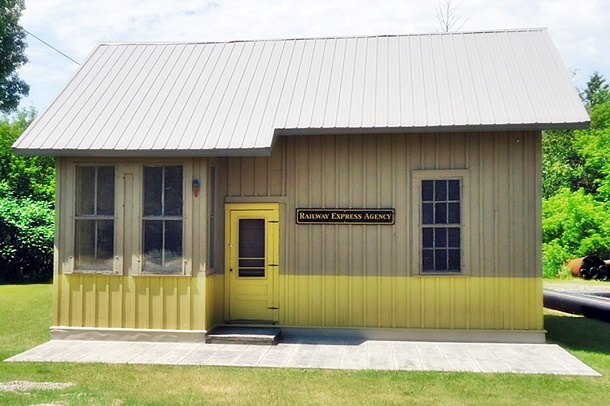
The Amberg Depot

The Amberg Historical Museum Complex in Amberg, Wisconsin consists of the Amberg Museum and other buildings of historical significance moved to the site. It is operated by the Amberg Historical Society in cooperation with the town of Amberg. The society is a nonprofit organization affiliated with the "Wisconsin Historical Society". The museum complex has been recognized by the Wisconsin Department of Tourism as a Wisconsin Heritage Site

The Amberg Museum building was originally the Amberg fire station. The museum contains the first Amberg fire engine which was a chemical fire engine pulled to the fire by firefighters. The Native American collection features Pottawatomie native medicinal plants and a Menominee dug out canoe. The lumbering collection contains a collection of vintage chain saws, a camp medicine chest from the Goodman Company, and there is a collection of end marks from logs taken from the Menominee River. The museum building also contains a blacksmith shop filled with a collection of blacksmith, carpenter, and mechanic tools. The veteran exhibit commemorates local veterans, particularly those who served in the two World Wars. The pioneer photograph collection presents numerous pictures of pioneer families and portrays the development of the town.

The Amberg Historical Society provides a research library in the Amberg Museum that contains town records, school records, family histories, photo albums and newspaper clippings. There is an online catalog that provides a detailed description and the history of many of the artifacts contained in the museum, biographies of important citizens, and oral histories. The museum website also contains a searchable catalog of selected artifacts and photographs, a virtual tour of the museum complex, and a comprehensive listing of the Amberg Cemetery.

The Old House depicts a household as it existed in Amberg during the late 19th to early 20th centuries. It was moved and restored with the help of numerous volunteers, classes of the Amberg Grade School, and local businesses and organizations. This project called the "Turn-of-the century" house was given the Hometown Pride Award by "Midwest Living" magazine.

Other buildings that were moved to the complex for preservation by the society include the original Amberg depot which was part of the "Chicago, Milwaukee, St. Paul and Pacific Railroad". and the Cedarville station which was a whistlestop often frequented by hobos in a now extinct community near Amberg.

Also moved to the museum complex was the derrick from the August Paveglio quarry. Granite quarrying was an important industry in Amberg. The Amberg Historical Society's publication, "Amberg--The First 100 Years 1890-1990" lists eleven quarries nearby Amberg. Granite samples, curbing blocks, stone cutter tools, and other artifacts are presented in the quarrying exhibit in the Amberg Museum.

In 2005 the town of Amberg allowed the Amberg Historical Society to use the original Amberg town hall which is on the "National Register of Historic Places". The society provides tours of the building which contains various exhibits such as a general store, school room, agricultural exhibit, and textiles. Each exhibit focuses on the local artifacts collected by the society.

The museum complex is located one-third mile off U.S. Route 141 on County V. The museum is open Fridays 1-4 PM and Saturdays 10 AM-4 PM Memorial Day through Labor Day. There is no charge for admission.

== See also ==
- List of historical societies in Wisconsin
