= Cedarburg History Museum =

Museum in Wisconsin

The Cedarburg History Museum is located in the historic Hilgen & Schroeder Mill Store, which is also home to the Cedarburg Chamber of Commerce and Cedarburg Visitor Center. The museum acquired the space in 2015 and began programming under the auspices of the Cedarburg Cultural Center in 2017. The Cedarburg History Museum has since 2019 functioned independently of the Cedarburg Cultural Center. The museum offers local photography collections in addition to its rotating exhibits.

In early 2021, the collection of the former Chudnow Museum of Yesteryear moved to the care and custody of the Cedarburg museum to enhance the latter's collection of local artifacts.
