= Cedarburg School District =

School district in Wisconsin, United States

The Cedarburg School District is the public school district serving Cedarburg, Wisconsin. It was established in 1886. The first schools, built in 1887, were the Hamilton Schoolhouse, now located in the Hamilton Historic District of Cedarburg, and the first Cedarburg Public School, built in 1894. The Cedarburg Public School building now serves as the Cedarburg senior center. The district operates three elementary schools, one middle school, and one high school. The superintendent is Todd Bugnacki.

== Schools ==
The three elementary schools in the Cedarburg School District serve students in kindergarten through fifth grade and have pre-kindergarten programs. They are all academically structured in the same way. English, math, science, and social studies are taught by the students' homeroom teachers. Music, physical education, and art are taught by teachers who specialize in those subjects. The school guidance counselor visits each classroom once a week. Classes also go to the school Information Media Center (IMC) once a week. Music, physical education, art, guidance, and media center alternate in the schedule so that each student has one hour of each class each week.

=== Westlawn Elementary School ===
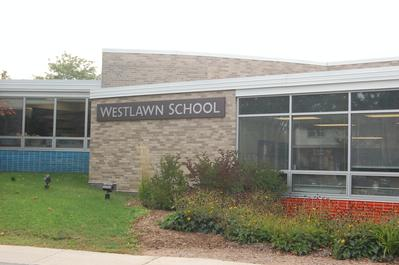

Westlawn Elementary School was built in 1956 to replace the Lincoln Building and the Hamilton Schoolhouse. Enrollment is 319. The principal is Katie Ramos. The school mascot is the Dolphin and the school colors are dark blue and light blue.

=== Parkview Elementary School ===
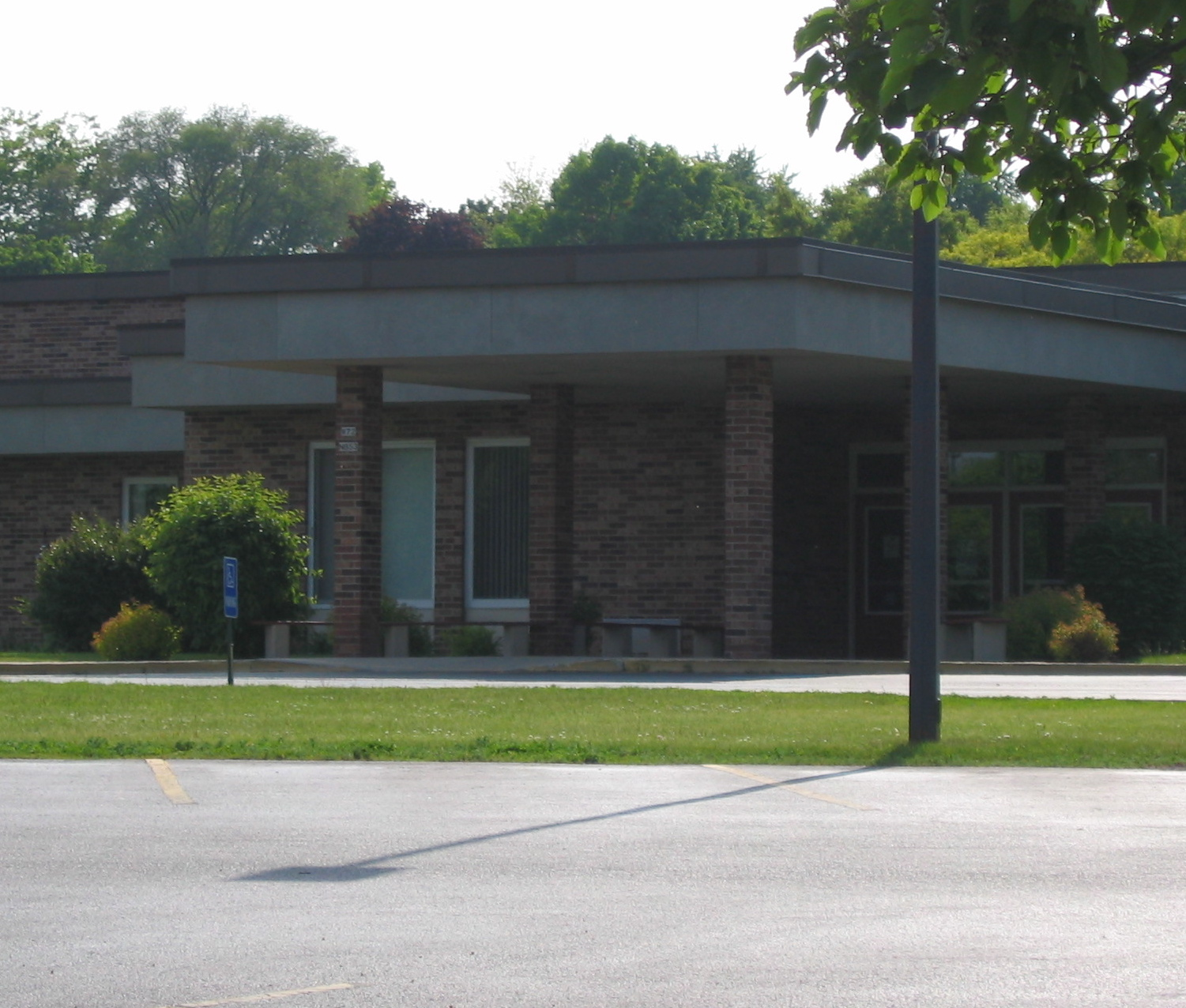

Parkview Elementary School was built in 1969. Enrollment is 401. The principal is Jayne Holck. The school mascot is the bull-pup (a young bull dog) and the school colors are blue and white.

=== Thorson Elementary School ===

Thorson Elementary School was built in 1969. Enrollment is 492. The principal is Angela Little. The school mascot is the Jaguar and the school colors are blue and white.

=== Webster Transitional School ===
Webster Transitional School, or Arthur L. Webster Transitional School, serves students in sixth through eighth grades. Webster was opened in 1973 to replace the original Cedarburg middle school system, which had students scattered across several buildings. Webster was a Blue Ribbon School in 1982-1983. It has 692 students. The principal is Tony DeRosa and the vice-principal Daniel Reinert. The school mascot is the Wolverine and the school's colors are blue and white.

Webster offers extracurricular activities ranging from sports to clubs to academic contests, such as the National Spelling Bee, the National Geography Bee and the Knowledge Master Open.

=== Cedarburg High School ===
Cedarburg High School (CHS) was founded in 1896, with the current building constructed in 1956. Enrollment is 1117. The school's principal is Casey Bowe. The school's vice principals are Trent Berg and Carolyn Neureuther. The school's mascot is the bulldog, whose name is Brutus (as of 2014), and the school colors are orange and black.

== Controversies ==
In 2006 CSD requested the resignation of a popular, science teacher at CHS, claiming he had viewed pornography on his district computer. When the teacher refused, the district held a school board meeting at which the board voted unanimously to fire the teacher. The teacher filed for arbitration, which the district accepted as binding. The arbitrator found for the teacher and ordered the district to reinstate him immediately. The district refused. After several court proceedings, the district won. As of 2010, the teacher remained unemployed.

=== Sex education opt-in policy ===
In 2010, the Cedarburg School District came up with an opt-in policy for sex education. If a parent did not sign a letter saying that his or her child would be participating in this education, the student would not be taking that part of the sex education, which cover issues such as abortion, homosexuality, contraception, and masturbation. This policy is in violation of Wisconsin state-law and the Cedarburg school district may face a lawsuit in the future.

== See also ==
- Ozaukee County, Wisconsin
