= Chudnow Museum of Yesteryear =

Former museum in Milwaukee, Wisconsin, US

Coordinates: 43.04112°N 87.92613°W

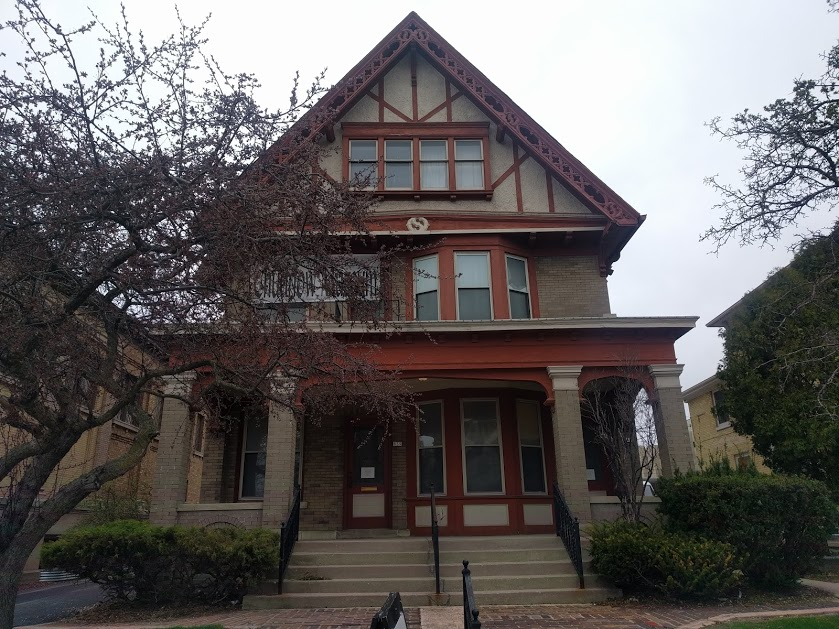
The Chudnow Museum of Yesteryear

The Chudnow Museum of Yesteryear is a former museum that was started by Avrum (Abe) M. Chudnow in 1991. The museum was housed in an 1869 residence on 839 North 11th Street Milwaukee, Wisconsin, United States. This house was formerly a clinic and home of Dr. Joseph J. Eisenberg. This house also held his extensive collection of artifacts from the late 1800s through 1970 which today make up the exhibits of the museum. In early 2021, the museum made the decision to close this location and transfer the collection to the Cedarburg History Museum.

== The Collection ==
Mr. Chudnow inherited his interest in collecting from his father who was a junk and scrap peddler. When his grandparents came to the United States they began their lives in America with very little and worked hard to make a life. That hard work continued to be passed down to their grandchild, Abe. Mr. Chudnow worked his way through Marquette University Law School and graduated with a law degree in 1937. Abe worked various jobs throughout his time at Marquette including selling shoes and subscriptions to the Milwaukee Sentinel. During this time, he began collecting different mementos from each job he held, and, when he joined the Army and served with the 519th Port Battalion during World War II, he began adding military memorabilia as well.

Always proud of his collection, which included toys from his childhood as well as the mementos he collected from jobs and his military service, he began to display it at home. Over the years he began to fill his basement with items that he found at flea markets, antique shops, and from family and friends. As his house began to fill he started moving more and more of his collection to his office.

At the office Abe began displaying and organizing most of his collection. He was able to sort his collection into groupings that included items from pharmacies, breweries, barbershops, and grocery stores. He began to display the items that he moved to his office so they might be enjoyed by others. The collection continued to grow, focusing on the first half of the 20th century and the Milwaukee Jewish community.

== Creation ==
In 1991 Mr. Chudnow formally created the Chudnow Museum of Yesteryear by filing to create a 501(c) (3) museum. Shortly after that, Abe hired a curator to come into the office and begin cataloging all the items in the museum. He also began to loan out his collection as exhibits for schools, synagogues, and other organizations such as the Milwaukee Public Museum and the Milwaukee County Historical Society.

== Chudnow Museum of Yesteryear, House Museum ==
Upon Mr. Chudnow's passing in 2005, his family followed through with his wish to create a permanent museum location. After looking at several locations, the family decided to turn the office on 11th and Wells into the permanent museum location. The Chudnow family donated the collection Abe had at his house as well as the collection at the office to the museum. Remodeling on the house began in 2011 and was completed in 2012. The Museum displayed Chudnow 's collection by recreating an early 19th-century grocery store, ice cream parlor, and train depot. Other areas showcased more of his collection which includes toys, books, musical instruments, political campaign material, clothing, artwork, Jewish artifacts, and many other articles.

The museum opened up to the public on July 20, 2012 with a Grand Opening on August 18–19, 2012.

In December 2020, the museum closed permanently and the collection was moved to the Cedarburg History Museum where it will be preserved and displayed in the broader context of the region's history. The museum's prior home will be sold.
