= Cedarburg Cultural Center =

Cultural center in Ozaukee County, Wisconsin

Coordinates: 43.29558°N 87.98687°W

The Cedarburg Cultural Center is located in the historic downtown of Cedarburg, Wisconsin. For more than 25 years it has provided a place for art, music and history to be shared with the community. The performance space presents a variety of music, theater and comedy. A free gallery surrounds the performance space with changing exhibits from local artists. The Center provides educational classes for children and adults in a variety of artistic mediums including photography, painting and ceramics. The center can also be rented for business, club, or personal meetings, events and receptions.

The Cedarburg Cultural Center preserves the heritage of the area communities through the 1849 Kuhefuss House Museum and restored 1920's schoolroom. Tours and exhibits include the Architectural Treasures Tour, school tours and historical photo collections displays. The center also supports the annual Strawberry and Wine & Harvest festivals.

According to the website, "The mission of the Cedarburg Cultural Center is to provide a gathering place to celebrate community, arts and local heritage."

== See also ==
- List of historical societies in Wisconsin
