= Pike River (Menominee River tributary) =

River in the U.S. state of Wisconsin

Coordinates: 45°26′29″N 87°51′21″W

The Pike River is a 15.8-mile-long (25.4 km) river in the U.S. state of Wisconsin. It is a tributary of the Menominee River and its entire length is in Marinette County.

The North and South Branch of the Pike River meet just above Dave's Falls near US 141 1 mile west of Amberg. From Dave's Falls the Pike River flows east and south to the Menominee River, joining it below the White Rapids Dam.
