= Amberg (CDP), Wisconsin =

Census-designated place in Wisconsin, United States

Amberg, Wisconsin
- Census-designated place
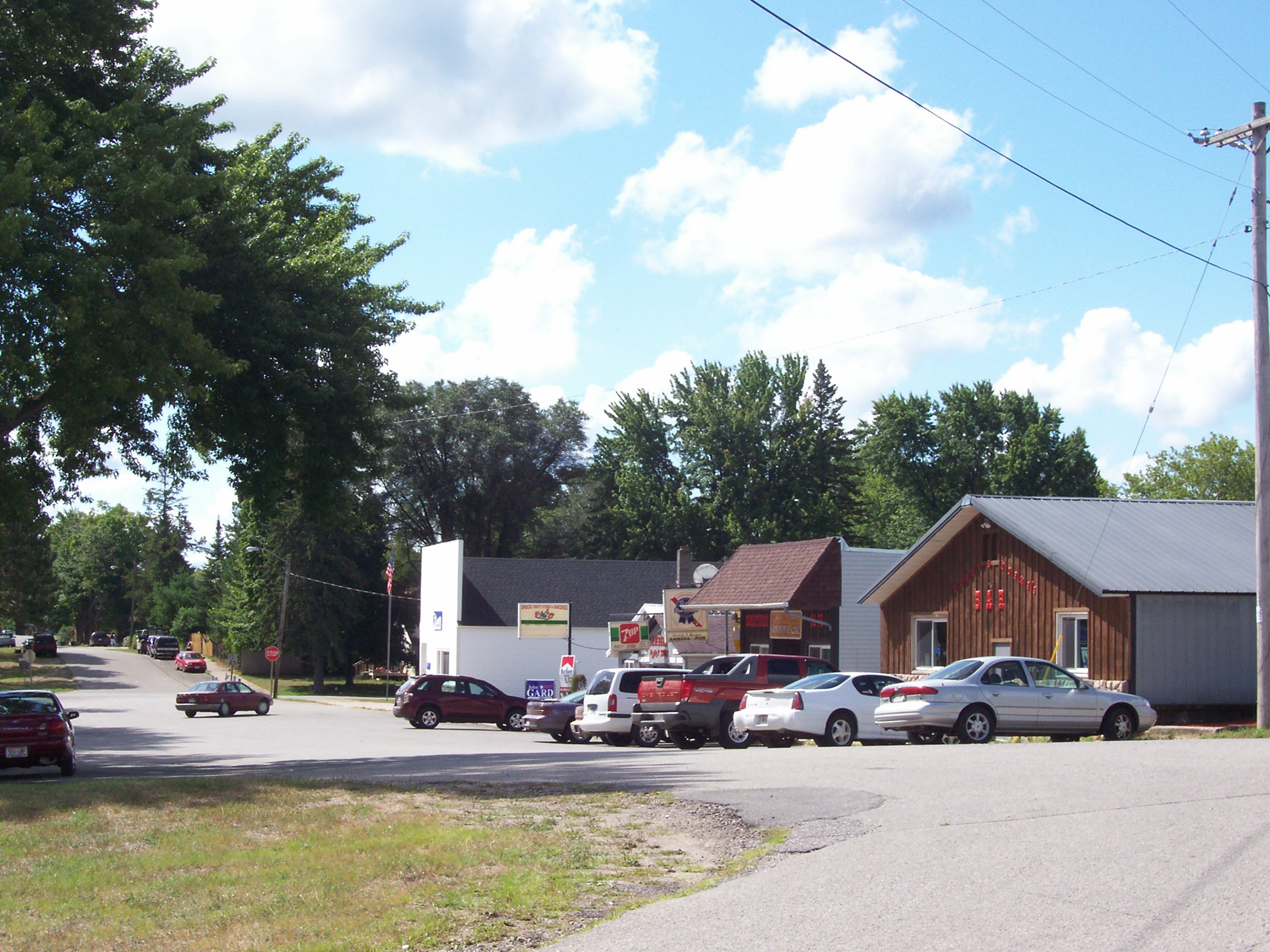
- Downtown Amberg

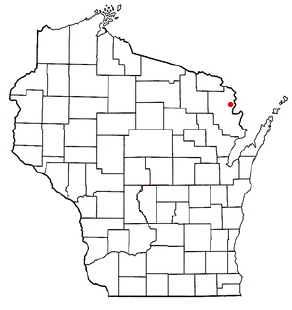
- Location in Wisconsin
- Coordinates: 45°30′11″N 87°59′37″W
- Country: United States
- State: Wisconsin
- County: Marinette

Area
  - Total: 1.62 sq mi (4.20 km^{2})
  - Land: 1.61 sq mi (4.18 km^{2})
  - Water: 0.0077 sq mi (0.02 km^{2})
- Elevation: 896 ft (273 m)

Population (2020)
  - Total: 147
  - Density: 91.1/sq mi (35.2/km^{2})
- Time zone: UTC-6 (Central (CST))
  - Summer (DST): UTC-5 (CDT)
- Area codes: 715 & 534
- GNIS feature ID: 1560815

Amberg is an unincorporated census-designated place in Marinette County, Wisconsin, United States, in the town of Amberg. It is located on U.S. Highway 141. As of the 2020 census, its population was 147. The Amberg Historical Society operates the Amberg Historical Museum Complex which consists of the historic town hall that is on the National Register of Historic Places, the community's train depot, a 1900-era house, and the Amberg Museum.

Dave's Falls is located near Amberg.

Amberg is part of the Marinette, WI–MI Micropolitan Statistical Area.

== Geography ==
Amberg has an area of 1.621 square miles (4.20 km^{2}); 1.613 square miles (4.18 km^{2}) of this is land, and .008 square miles (0.021 km^{2}) is water.

== Demographics ==
Historical population
Census	Pop.	Note	%±
2010	180		—
2020	147		−18.3%
U.S. Decennial Census

== History ==
The first permanent settler in what is now Amberg was Warren Buckman (1857–1925), who established a trading post west of the Pike River in 1883. He was followed by Charles Dahl (1862–1944), a railroad surveyor, in 1884. The post office was established in 1884 with the name Pike, and the name was changed to Amberg in 1890. It is named after William Amberg (1847–1918), a Chicago businessman that created granite quarries in the area.

== Images ==
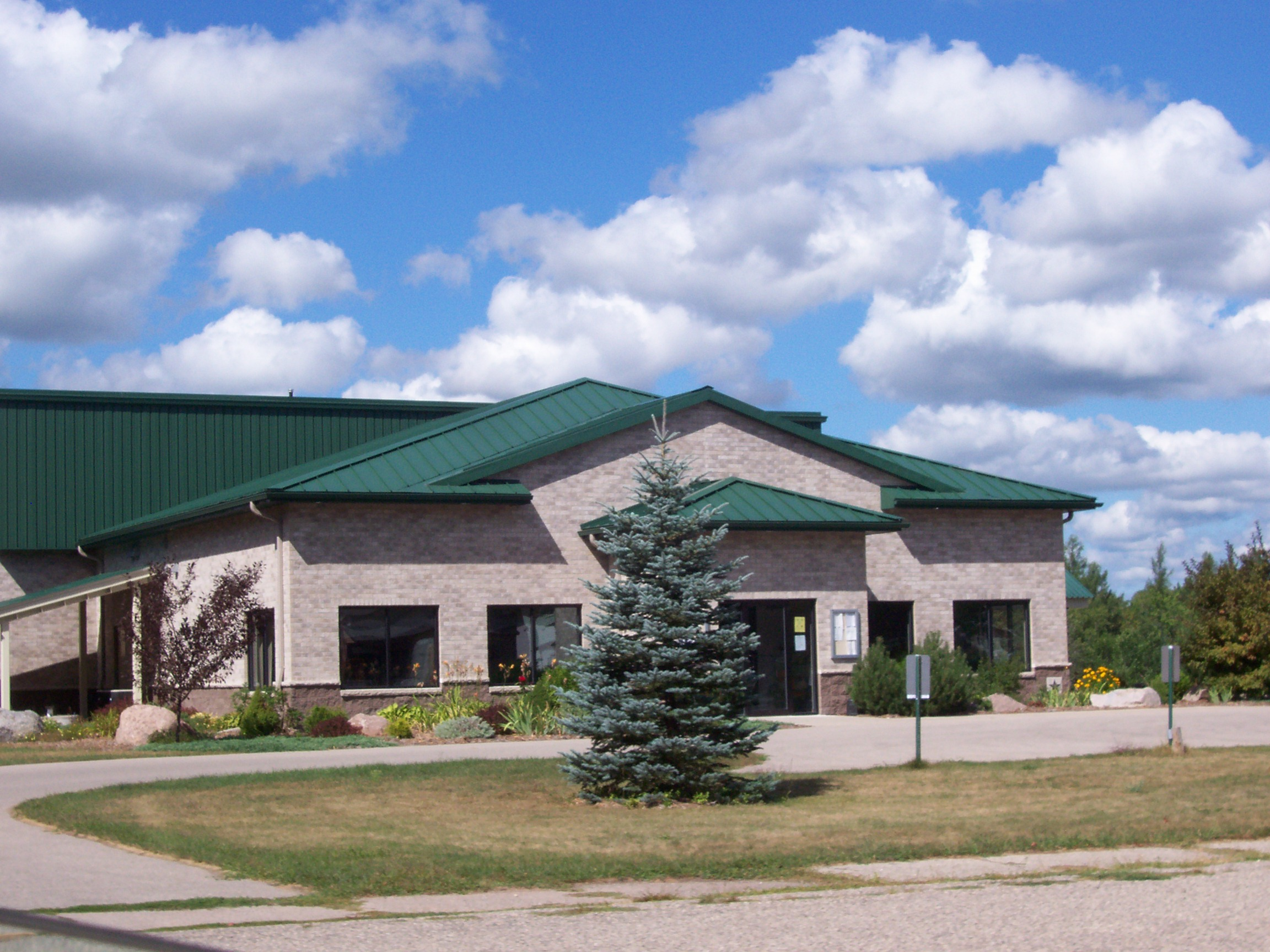
Community center

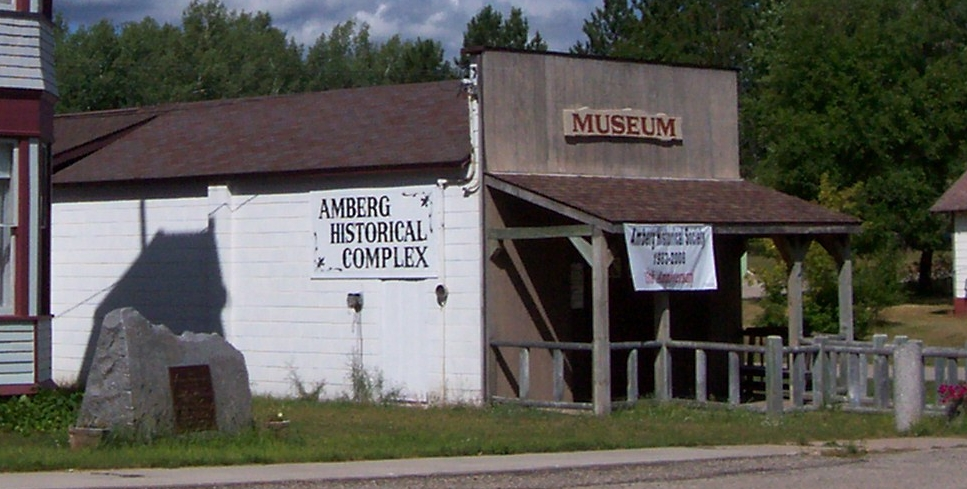
Amberg Historic Museum

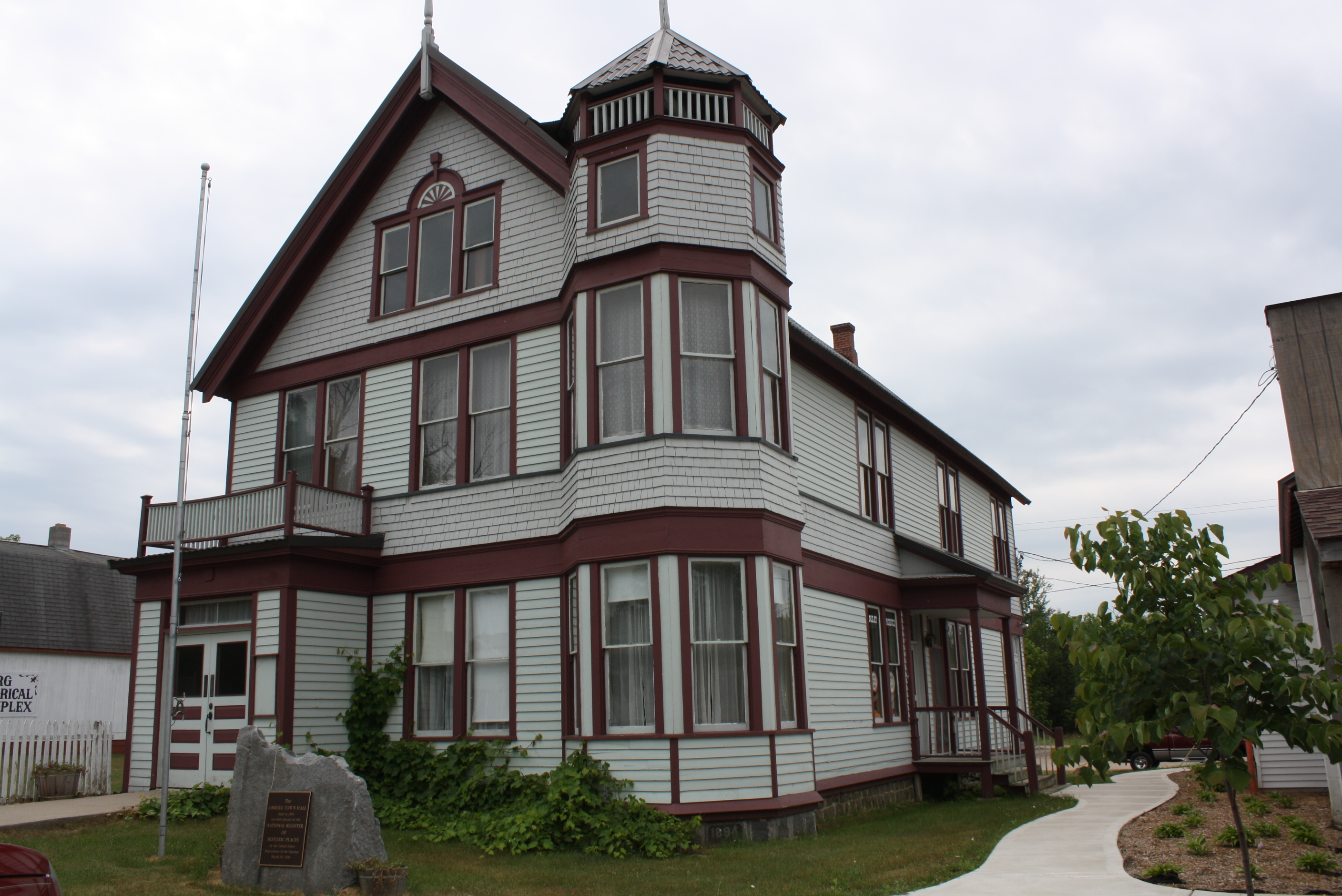
Amberg Town Hall

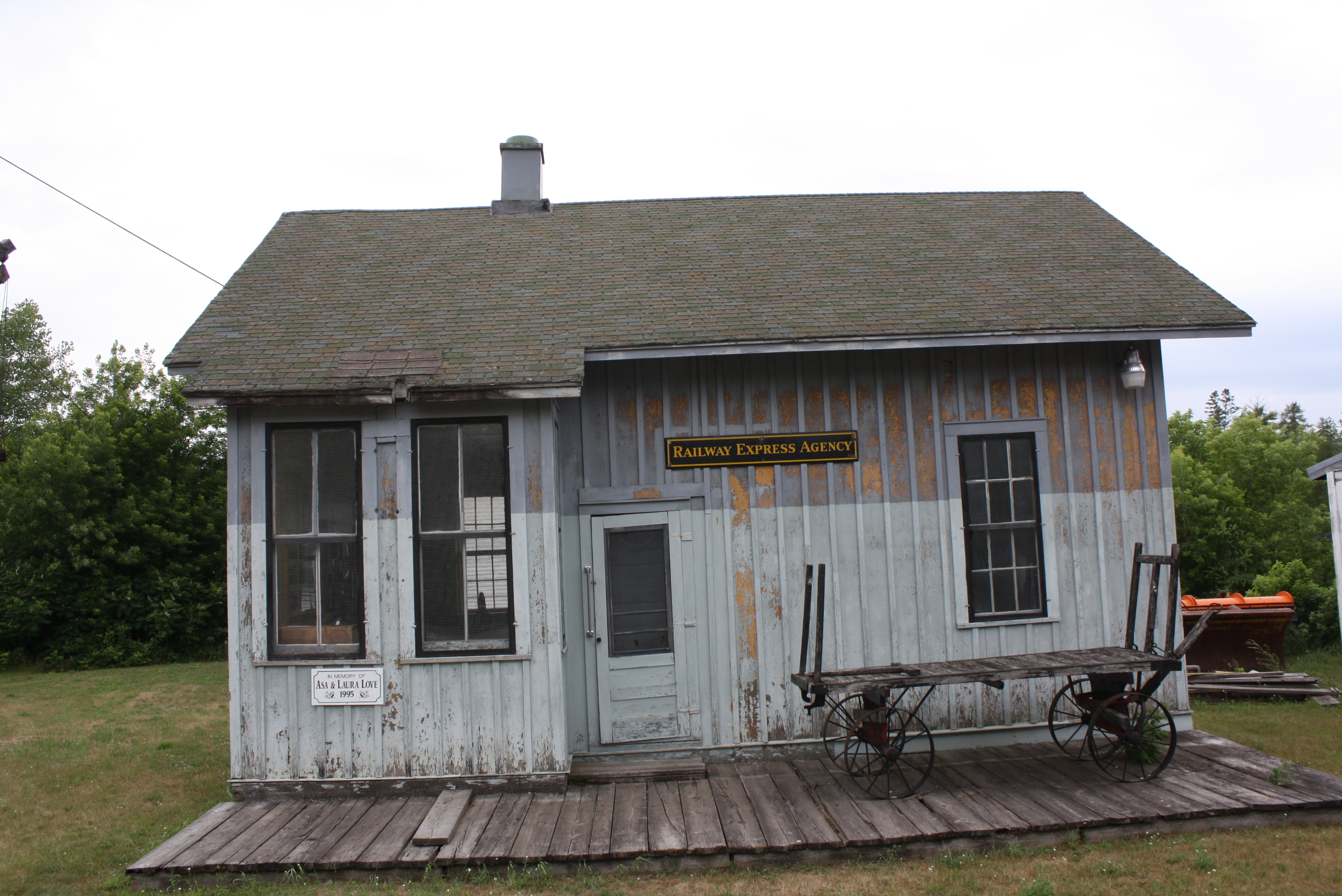
Historic train depot

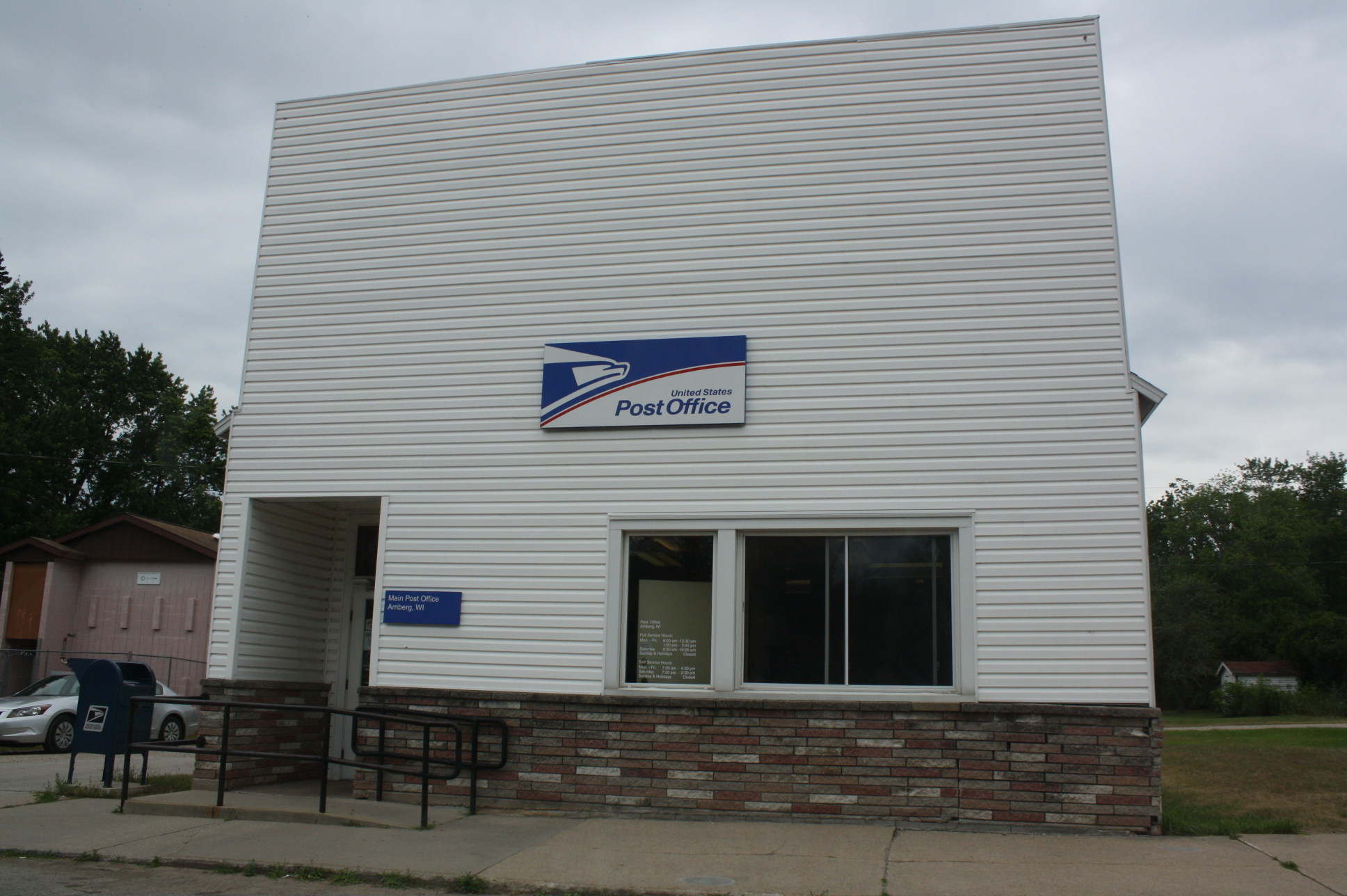
Post office
