= Dave's Falls =

Waterfall in Wisconsin

Coordinates: 45°29′46″N 87°59′19″W

Dave's Falls is a waterfall in Marinette County, Wisconsin, 1 mile (1.6 km) south of Amberg, in the town of Amberg. It is off U.S. Highway 141 between Old 38 Road and Old Highway 141 Road.

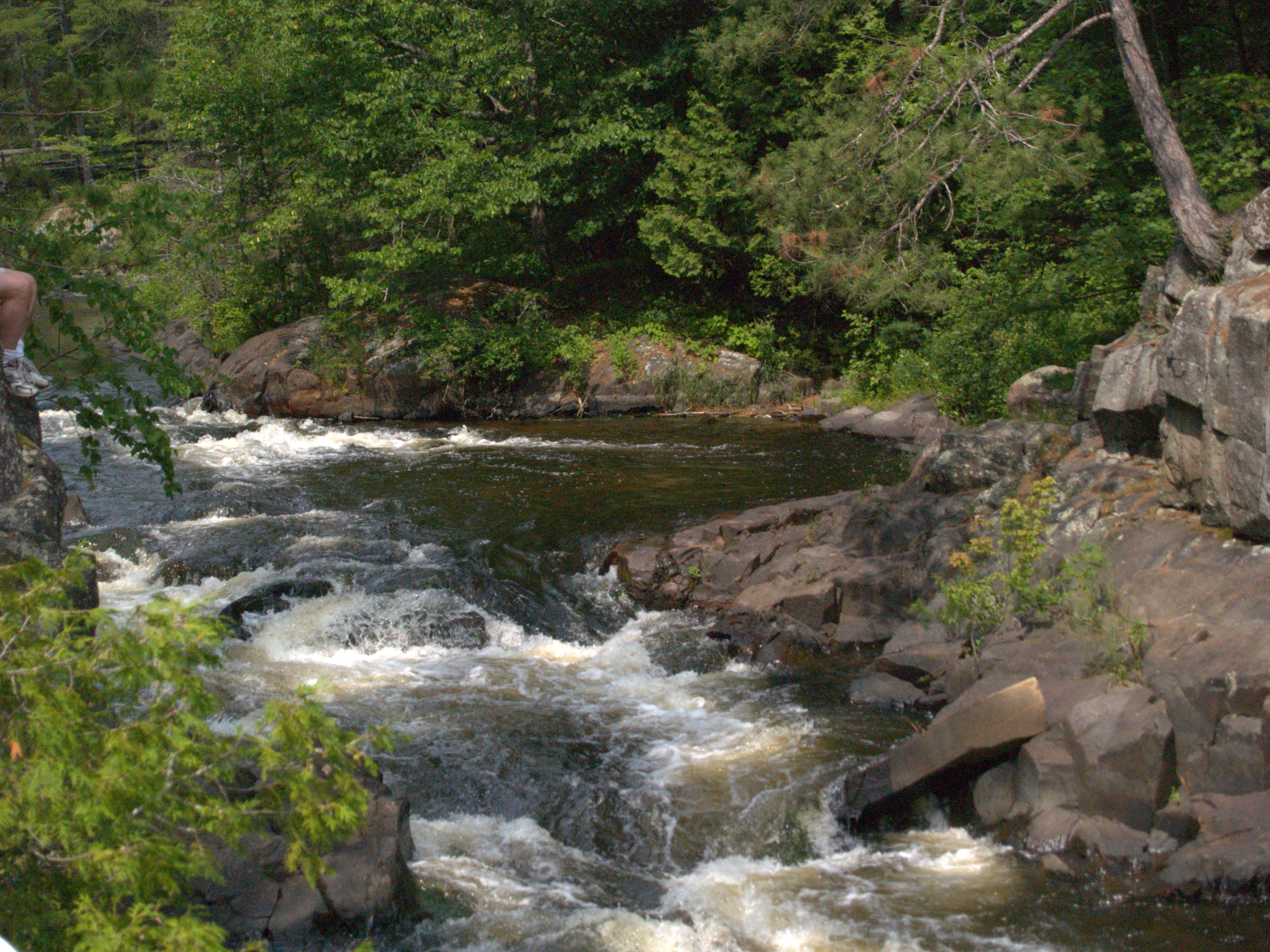
White Water

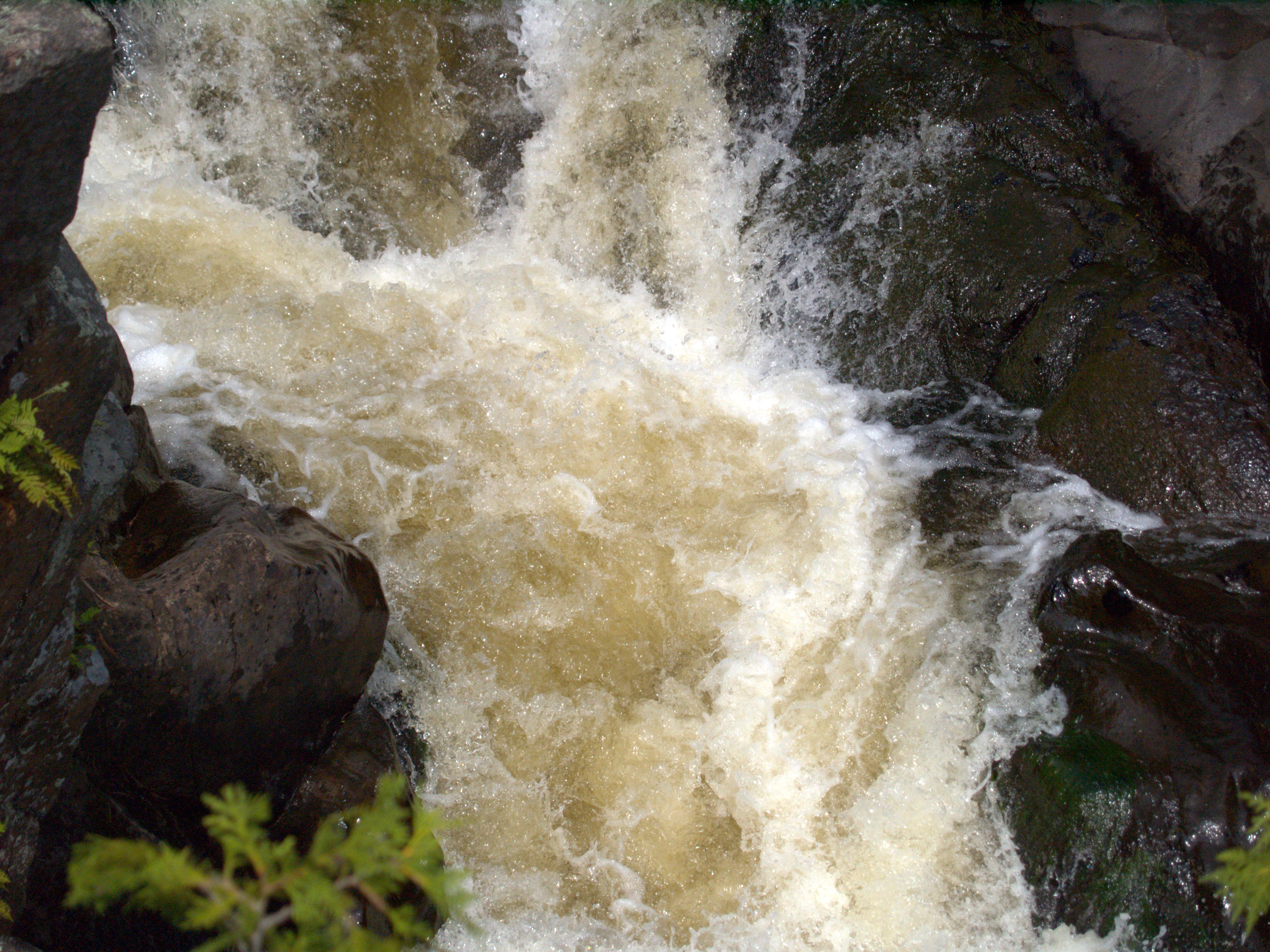
White Water Close up

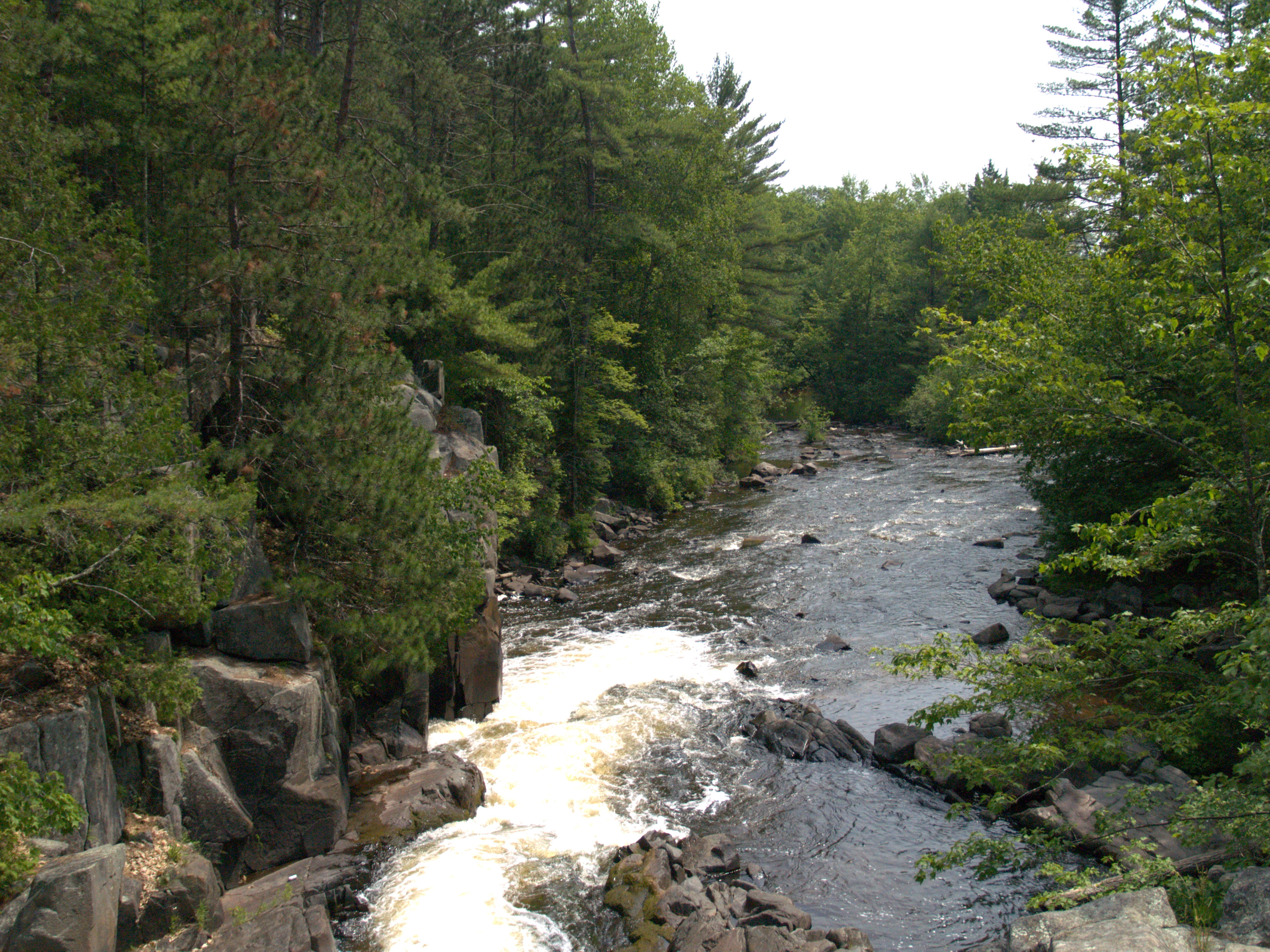
Down River
