= Amberg, Wisconsin =

- Town
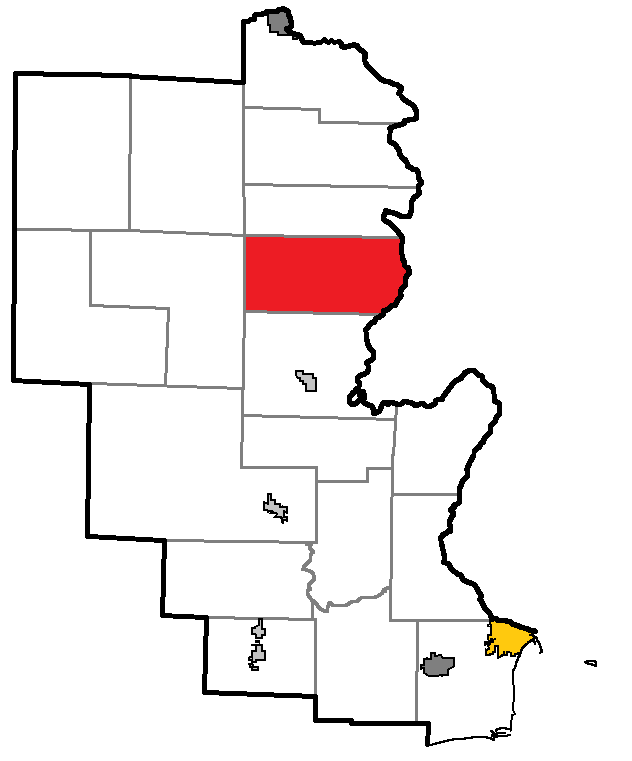
- Location of Amberg, within Marinette County
- Coordinates: 45°29′10″N 87°57′58″W
- Country: United States
- State: Wisconsin
- County: Marinette

Area
  - Total: 72.7 sq mi (188.3 km^{2})
  - Land: 71.8 sq mi (186.0 km^{2})
  - Water: 0.89 sq mi (2.3 km^{2})
- Elevation: 817 ft (249 m)

Population (2020)
  - Total: 693
  - Density: 9.65/sq mi (3.73/km^{2})
- Time zone: UTC-6 (Central (CST))
  - Summer (DST): UTC-5 (CDT)
- Area codes: 715 & 534
- FIPS code: 55-01675
- GNIS feature ID: 1582687
- Website: https://tn.amberg.wi.gov/

Amberg is a town in Marinette County, Wisconsin, United States. The population was 693 at the 2020 census. The unincorporated community of Cedarville is located partially in the town. The census-designated place of Amberg is located within the town.

== Geology ==
=== The Amberg and Athelstane Granites ===
Amberg is located in Northeastern Wisconsin about 75 miles (121 km) north of Green Bay in Marinette County. The Amberg-Athelstane Granite is part of the Wisconsin Magmatic Terrane. The Wisconsin Magmatic Terrane is an area formed by a tectonic plate collision at about 1850 Ma. marked by the Niagara Fault Zone. The Amberg Granite is one of the most extensive in Wisconsin. It is well known for its great variety of color and texture. The two most common types are a fine-grained gray granite and a course-grained red granite known as "Amberg red." These granites were a valuable commodity in the late 19th century and early 20th century, causing quarries to be started in the area.

Dave's Falls is located about 1-mile (1.6 km) south of Amberg.

== History ==
=== Labor history ===
There were several main companies in the Amberg area during the late 19th and early 20th centuries. The Amberg Granite Company was the first in the area and later, the Pike River Granite Company, which formed in large part due to poor working conditions at the Amberg Granite Company. The Amberg Granite Company was owned by William Amberg of Chicago and consisted of quarry operations in Amberg—the Argyle, Martindale, the Athelstane and Aberdeen. The Argyle and the Martindale quarries produced the fine-grained gray granite and the Aberdeen quarry produced the "Amberg red." The Athelstane produced a gray granite, but course grained, similar in texture to the Amberg red. Much of their granite was used in Chicago for curbing blocks and street paving. It was also used for buildings such as, the Minnesota State Capitol, and buildings in Chicago and Cincinnati. The Pike River company produced primarily the fine-grained gray granite and much of it was sold as monumental stone because of its strength and attractiveness. However, in 1929, 500–600 cars of this stone was sold to the Universal Granite Company of Milwaukee to be used as breakwater stone. Although, once a thriving, profitable businesses, there are no longer any active quarries operating in the Amberg area. More about the history of these quarries and the surrounding area can be found at the Amberg Museum complex, this is located in the town of Amberg on Marinette County V, right off of Highway 141.

== Geography ==
According to the United States Census Bureau, the town has a total area of 72.7 square miles (188.3 km^{2}), of which 71.8 square miles (186.0 km^{2}) is land and 0.9 square mile (2.3 km^{2}) (1.21%) is water.

== Demographics ==
Historical population
| Census | Pop. | Note | %± |
|---|---|---|---|
| 2000 | 854 | | — |
| 2020 | 693 | | — |
U.S. Decennial Census

As of the census of 2000, there were 854 people, 395 households, and 242 families residing in the town. The population density was 11.9 inhabitants per square mile (4.6/km^{2}). There were 942 housing units at an average density of 13.1 per square mile (5.1/km^{2}). The racial makeup of the town was 97.19% White, 1.05% African American, 1.17% Native American, 0.23% Asian, and 0.35% from two or more races. Hispanic or Latino of any race were 1.05% of the population.

There were 395 households, out of which 21.0% had children under the age of 18 living with them, 50.9% were married couples living together, 5.1% had a female householder with no husband present, and 38.5% were non-families. 35.2% of all households were made up of individuals, and 16.5% had someone living alone who was 65 years of age or older. The average household size was 2.16 and the average family size was 2.76.

In the town, the population was spread out, with 19.8% under the age of 18, 5.2% from 18 to 24, 22.8% from 25 to 44, 30.4% from 45 to 64, and 21.8% who were 65 years of age or older. The median age was 46 years. For every 100 females, there were 108.3 males. For every 100 females age 18 and over, there were 112.7 males.

The median income for a household in the town was $26,667, and the median income for a family was $36,250. Males had a median income of $31,250 versus $20,000 for females. The per capita income for the town was $17,717. About 7.6% of families and 13.2% of the population were below the poverty line, including 17.8% of those under age 18 and 9.0% of those age 65 or over.
