= Kettle Moraine Conference =

Wisconsin high school athletic conference (1928-1969)

The Kettle Moraine Conference is a former high school athletic conference with its membership concentrated in Wisconsin's Kettle Moraine region. It existed from 1928 to 1969 and all public school members were affiliated with the Wisconsin Interscholastic Athletic Association.

== History ==
=== 1928–1957 ===
Location of Original Kettle Moraine Conference Members
Location of Kettle Moraine Conference Members (1939-1955)

The Kettle Moraine Conference was formed in 1928 by five small high schools in Sheboygan and Ozaukee Counties: Grafton, Howards Grove, Oostburg, Random Lake and Waldo. Glenbeulah High School would join in 1929 from the Fox Valley Tri-County League, and Howards Grove would leave the conference a year later. Cedar Grove joined the Kettle Moraine Conference in 1931, bringing conference membership to six schools. It would remain at six when Howards Grove made their return to the Kettle Moraine Conference in 1934, replacing Glenbeulah, who exited the conference that year. Glenbeulah would return in 1939, and the conference would continue as a seven-member circuit for fifteen years. Stockbridge High School joined in 1954, bringing membership to its highest total of eight schools.

=== 1957–1963 ===
In 1957, the Kettle Moraine Conference lost Glenbeulah after their school district consolidated with Elkhart Lake, with the new Elkhart Lake-Glenbeulah High School remaining in the Eastern Wisconsin Conference. Grafton would leave the next year to join the new Scenic Moraine Conference, decreasing membership to six schools. In 1960, Oostburg left to join the Eastern Wisconsin Conference and Random Lake followed Grafton into the Scenic Moraine Conference. Oostburg would play one more football season in the Kettle Moraine before joining the EWC for football in 1961. The Kettle Moraine Conference would play for two seasons as a four-member loop before Waldo High School closed after consolidation with Sheboygan Falls in 1962. In 1963, Cedar Grove and Howards Grove tentatively reached an agreement to join the Eastern Wisconsin Conference, only to have it reversed a few months later.

=== 1963–1969 ===
Location of Final Kettle Moraine Conference Members

After the EWC's rejection of Cedar Grove and Howards Grove, the three remaining schools accepted St. Gregory High School, a Catholic high school in St. Nazianz into the conference to bring the loop to four members. Manitowoc Lutheran entered the Kettle Moraine Conference as its fifth member school in 1964 after the cessation of the Badger Lutheran Conference. In 1965, Cedar Grove became members of the Eastern Wisconsin Conference, two years after its initial application for membership was rejected. They were replaced by the new Ozaukee High School in Fredonia, marking their first conference affiliation. In 1967, Manitowoc Lutheran left the Kettle Moraine Conference for membership in the Peninsula Conference. Another Manitowoc-based private high school (Roncalli) replaced them as conference members for one season before joining the Fox Valley Catholic Conference in 1968. The Kettle Moraine Conference was disbanded in 1969, with two of its former members (Howards Grove and Ozaukee) becoming charter members of the Central Lakeshore Conference. Stockbridge played one season as an independent before joining the new Bay-Lakes Conference in 1970, and St. Gregory closed shortly after the conference's dissolution.

=== Football ===
Due to the small size of its member schools, the Kettle Moraine Conference did not sponsor football until 1951, when three schools (Grafton, Oostburg and Random Lake) participated in six-man football. Waldo started its own football team the next year, bringing the football group to four schools for the next three seasons. League play was interrupted from 1955 to 1957 as the Kettle Moraine Conference sponsored fall baseball instead of football, as they had previously done in the years after World War II. Football returned to the conference's athletic offerings in 1958, this time in the normal eleven-player format with four schools participating (Grafton, Oostburg, Random Lake and Waldo). Grafton played one season as a football-only member of the conference, leaving to align fully with the Scenic Moraine Conference starting with the 1958-59 winter sports season. After Grafton's departure, Cedar Grove and Howards Grove entered conference play, with Howards Grove sponsoring football for the first time. Random Lake's departure for the Scenic Moraine Conference in 1960 decreased football membership to four schools, with Oostburg playing one last season as a football-only member before departing for membership in the Eastern Wisconsin Conference. Their place would be filled by Elkhart Lake-Glenbeulah (whose primary affiliation was with the EWC) for the 1961 season. Membership was whittled down to three football-playing members with Waldo High School's 1962 closing. Elkhart Lake's departure the next year led to suspension of football sponsorship for the 1963 season due to lack of teams. Football returned in 1964, with new conference members Manitowoc Lutheran and Stockbridge joining Cedar Grove and Howards Grove to create a four-team loop. In 1965, Cedar Grove left to join the Eastern Wisconsin Conference, with new conference members Ozaukee replacing them. This alignment would continue until Manitowoc Lutheran's exit to join the Peninsula Conference in 1967, with Roncalli replacing them for one season before joining the Fox Valley Catholic Conference in 1968. The 1967 season would be the conference's last before completely dissolving after the 1968-69 school year.

== Conference membership history ==
=== Final members ===
School	Location	Affiliation	Nickname	Colors	Joined	Left	Conference Joined	Current Conference
Howards Grove	Howards Grove, WI	Public	Tigers		1928, 1934	1930, 1969	Independent, Central Lakeshore	Big East
Ozaukee	Fredonia, WI	Public	Warriors		1965	1969	Central Lakeshore	Big East
St. Gregory	St. Nazianz, WI	Private (Catholic)	Knights		1963	1969	Closed	
Stockbridge	Stockbridge, WI	Public	Indians		1954	1969	Independent	

=== Previous members ===
School	Location	Affiliation	Nickname	Colors	Joined	Left	Conference Joined	Current Conference
Cedar Grove	Cedar Grove, WI	Public	Rockets		1931	1965	Eastern Wisconsin	Big East
Glenbeulah	Glenbeulah, WI	Public	Boosters		1929, 1939	1934, 1957	Closed (consolidated into Elkhart Lake-Glenbeulah)	
Grafton	Grafton, WI	Public	Blackhawks		1928	1958	Scenic Moraine	North Shore
Manitowoc Lutheran	Manitowoc, WI	Private (Lutheran, WELS)	Lancers		1964	1967	Peninsula	Big East
Oostburg	Oostburg, WI	Public	Dutchmen		1928	1960	Eastern Wisconsin	Big East
Random Lake	Random Lake, WI	Public	Rams		1928	1960	Scenic Moraine	Big East
Roncalli	Manitowoc, WI	Private (Catholic)	Jets		1967	1968	Fox Valley Catholic	Eastern Wisconsin
Waldo	Waldo, WI	Public	Golden Royals		1928	1962	Closed (consolidated into Sheboygan Falls)	

=== Football-only members ===
School	Location	Affiliation	Mascot	Colors	Seasons	Primary Conference
Grafton	Grafton, WI	Public	Blackhawks		1958	Scenic Moraine
Oostburg	Oostburg, WI	Public	Dutchmen		1960	Eastern Wisconsin
Elkhart Lake-Glenbeulah	Elkhart Lake, WI	Public	Resorters		1961-1962	Eastern Wisconsin

== List of conference champions ==
=== Boys Basketball ===
School	Quantity	Years
Cedar Grove	15	1934, 1938, 1939, 1946, 1952, 1953, 1954, 1955, 1958, 1960, 1961, 1962, 1963, 1964, 1965
Oostburg	12	1940, 1941, 1944, 1947, 1949, 1951, 1953, 1954, 1956, 1957, 1958, 1959
Random Lake	8	1932, 1935, 1936, 1937, 1938, 1945, 1950, 1952
Grafton	5	1929, 1930, 1934, 1939, 1942
Howards Grove	5	1948, 1962, 1967, 1968, 1969
Waldo	2	1931, 1933
Stockbridge	1	1966
Glenbeulah	0	
Manitowoc Lutheran	0	
Ozaukee	0	
Roncalli	0	
St. Gregory	0	

=== Football ===
School	Quantity	Years
Oostburg	6	1952, 1953, 1954, 1958, 1959, 1960
Howards Grove	4	1964, 1965, 1966, 1967
Cedar Grove	2	1961, 1962
Random Lake	1	1951
Elkhart Lake-Glenbeulah	0	
Grafton	0	
Manitowoc Lutheran	0	
Ozaukee	0	
Roncalli	0	
Stockbridge	0	
Waldo	0	
