= Scenic Moraine Conference =

Wisconsin high school athletic conference (1958-1980)

The Scenic Moraine Conference is a former high school athletic conference in Wisconsin, operating from 1958 to 1980 with its membership concentrated in the Kettle Moraine region. The conference and its member schools belonged to the Wisconsin Interscholastic Athletic Association.

== History ==
Location of Original Scenic Moraine Conference Members

=== 1958-1969 ===
The Scenic Moraine Conference was formed in 1958 by six high schools located in Washington, Fond du Lac and Ozaukee Counties: Campbellsport, Germantown, Grafton, Kewaskum, North Fond du Lac and Slinger. At the time of the conference's formation, there was already a high school athletic conference based in Sheboygan County called the Kettle Moraine Conference, and the Scenic Moraine name was chosen to avoid confusion between the two leagues. Among the other names considered were the Inland Waters, Lake Shore, Milwaukee River Valley, Seaway and Skyline. Only four conference members (Campbellsport, Kewaskum, North Fond du Lac and Slinger) competed in the conference's first football season in 1958, with full members Germantown and Grafton joining the year after. The Scenic Moraine Conference added Pewaukee as a full member in 1959 (and for football the year after) and Random Lake in 1960, bringing conference membership to eight schools.

Location of Final Scenic Moraine Conference Members

=== 1969-1980 ===
The Scenic Moraine Conference remained an eight-member loop for its entire existence. Arrowhead joined from the Southeastern Badger Conference in 1969, replacing Random Lake after they left to join the new Central Lakeshore Conference. The next year, Kettle Moraine and Mayville replaced Campbellsport and North Fond du Lac when they became charter members of the Flyway Conference. The Scenic Moraine's membership roster remained unchanged for the rest of the conference's history, but large gulfs were developing between member school districts in enrollment levels which led to discussions on realignment between conferences in southeastern Wisconsin in the mid-1970s. The Scenic Moraine Conference was one of two conferences dissolved in 1980, along with the South Shore Conference. Three schools each were dispersed to the Braveland Conference (Arrowhead, Germantown and Grafton) and Parkland Conference (Kettle Moraine, Pewaukee and Slinger). The other two schools, Kewaskum and Mayville, moved to the Eastern Wisconsin and Flyway conferences, respectively.

== Conference membership history ==
=== Final members ===
School	Location	Affiliation	Mascot	Colors	Joined	Left	Conference Joined	Current Conference
Arrowhead	Hartland, WI	Public	Warhawks		1969	1980	Braveland	Classic 8
Germantown	Germantown, WI	Public	Warhawks		1958	1980	Braveland	Greater Metro
Grafton	Grafton, WI	Public	Black Hawks		1958	1980	Braveland	North Shore
Kettle Moraine	Wales, WI	Public	Lasers		1970	1980	Parkland	Classic 8
Kewaskum	Kewaskum, WI	Public	Indians		1958	1980	Eastern Wisconsin	Glacier Trails
Mayville	Mayville, WI	Public	Cardinals		1970	1980	Flyway	Wisconsin Flyway
Pewaukee	Pewaukee, WI	Public	Pirates		1959	1980	Parkland	Woodland
Slinger	Slinger, WI	Public	Owls		1958	1980	Parkland	North Shore

=== Former members ===
School	Location	Affiliation	Mascot	Colors	Joined	Left	Conference Joined	Current Conference
Campbellsport	Campbellsport, WI	Public	Cougars		1958	1970	Flyway	Wisconsin Flyway
North Fond du Lac	North Fond du Lac, WI	Public	Orioles		1958	1970	Flyway	Wisconsin Flyway
Random Lake	Random Lake, WI	Public	Rams		1960	1969	Central Lakeshore	Big East

== Membership timeline ==
Non-football member

== List of state champions ==
=== Fall sports ===
Boys Cross Country
School	Year	Division
Kewaskum	1961	Small Schools
Kettle Moraine	1970	Small Schools

Girls Volleyball
School	Year	Division
Pewaukee	1974	Class B
Pewaukee	1974	Class B

=== Winter sports ===
None

=== Spring sports ===
Boys Track & Field
School	Year	Division
Germantown	1972	Class B

== List of conference champions ==
=== Boys Basketball ===
School	Quantity	Years
Grafton	7	1963, 1964, 1965, 1966, 1967, 1973, 1975
Arrowhead	5	1975, 1977, 1978, 1979, 1980
Mayville	3	1971, 1972, 1979
Campbellsport	2	1959, 1960
Germantown	2	1973, 1974
Kewaskum	2	1970, 1976
Slinger	2	1969, 1977
Kettle Moraine	1	1975
North Fond du Lac	1	1968
Pewaukee	1	1961
Random Lake	1	1962

=== Girls Basketball ===
School	Quantity	Years
Arrowhead	4	1977, 1978, 1979, 1980
Mayville	1	1976
Germantown	0	
Grafton	0	
Kettle Moraine	0	
Kewaskum	0	
Pewaukee	0	
Slinger	0	

=== Football ===
School	Quantity	Years
Grafton	8	1964, 1966, 1967, 1968, 1969, 1975, 1977, 1978
Germantown	4	1965, 1973, 1974, 1979
Pewaukee	4	1962, 1965, 1967, 1978
North Fond du Lac	3	1959, 1960, 1963
Arrowhead	2	1972, 1976
Mayville	2	1970, 1971
Campbellsport	1	1959
Kewaskum	1	1975
Random Lake	1	1961
Slinger	1	1958
Kettle Moraine	0	
