= Central Lakeshore Conference =

Wisconsin high school athletic conference (1969-2015)

The Central Lakeshore Conference is a former high school athletic conference in east central Wisconsin. It was operational from 1969 to 2015 and all member schools (with the exception of one) were members of the Wisconsin Interscholastic Athletic Association.

== History ==
Location of Original Central Lakeshore Conference Members

The Central Lakeshore Conference was formed in 1969 by seven small high schools in Sheboygan and Ozaukee Counties in east central Wisconsin. Four members were previously in the Eastern Wisconsin Conference (Cedar Grove, Elkhart Lake-Glenbeulah, Kohler and Oostburg), two entered from the disbanded Kettle Moraine Conference (Howards Grove and Ozaukee) and Random Lake joined after leaving the Scenic Moraine Conference. The recently opened John F. Kennedy Prep in St. Nazianz joined a year later, but their stay in the conference was short-lived. The Catholic high school was removed from the Central Lakeshore Conference in 1973 because of alleged violations against rules on student transfers. The Central Lakeshore Conference's membership roster would remain relatively stable for a quarter century with the only change being a short stint in the conference for Stockbridge from 1979 to 1981. Oakfield joined as a football-only member from 1987 through the 1998 season after competing in the Flyway Conference, which remained their primary affiliation for all other sports. In 1999, two private high schools in Sheboygan (Sheboygan Christian and Sheboygan Lutheran) would join as part of the WIAA/WISAA merger. Stockbridge rejoined the Central Lakeshore in 2007 for the final eight years of the conference's run. In 2015, all members of the Central Lakeshore Conference with the exception of Stockbridge joined with five members of the Olympian Conference (Hilbert, Manitowoc Lutheran, Mishicot, Reedsville and St. Mary Catholic in Neenah) to form the fourteen-member Big East Conference.

== Conference membership history ==
=== Final members ===
| School | Location | Affiliation | Mascot | Colors | Joined | Left | Conference Joined | Current Conference |
|---|---|---|---|---|---|---|---|---|
| Cedar Grove-Belgium | Cedar Grove, WI | Public | Rockets | | 1969 | 2015 | Big East | |
| Elkhart Lake-Glenbeulah | Elkhart Lake, WI | Public | Resorters | | 1969 | 2015 | Big East | |
| Howards Grove | Howards Grove, WI | Public | Tigers | | 1969 | 2015 | Big East | |
| Kohler | Kohler, WI | Public | Blue Bombers | | 1969 | 2015 | Big East | |
| Oostburg | Oostburg, WI | Public | Dutchmen | | 1969 | 2015 | Big East | |
| Ozaukee | Fredonia, WI | Public | Warriors | | 1969 | 2015 | Big East | |
| Random Lake | Random Lake, WI | Public | Rams | | 1969 | 2015 | Big East | |
| Sheboygan Christian | Sheboygan, WI | Private (Christian) | Eagles | | 1999 | 2015 | Big East | |
| Sheboygan Lutheran | Sheboygan, WI | Private (Lutheran, LCMS) | Crusaders | | 1999 | 2015 | Big East | |
| Stockbridge | Stockbridge, WI | Public | Indians | | 1979, 2007 | 1981 2015 | Independent | |

=== Previous members ===
| School | Location | Affiliation | Mascot | Colors | Joined | Left | Conference Joined | Current Conference |
|---|---|---|---|---|---|---|---|---|
| John F. Kennedy Prep | St. Nazianz, WI | Private (Catholic) | Moors | | 1970 | 1973 | Independent | Closed in 1982 |

=== Football-only members ===
| School | Location | Affiliation | Mascot | Colors | Seasons | Primary Conference |
|---|---|---|---|---|---|---|
| Oakfield | Oakfield, WI | Public | Oaks | | 1987-1998 | Flyway |

== List of state champions ==
=== Fall sports ===
Boys Cross Country
| School | Year | Division |
|---|---|---|
| Sheboygan Lutheran | 2004 | Division 3 |
| Sheboygan Lutheran | 2005 | Division 3 |
| Sheboygan Lutheran | 2006 | Division 3 |
| Cedar Grove-Belgium | 2009 | Division 3 |

Boys Soccer
| School | Year | Division |
|---|---|---|
| Oostburg | 1994 | Division 2 |
| Sheboygan Christian | 2002 | Division 3 |
| Sheboygan Christian | 2003 | Division 3 |

Girls Volleyball
| School | Year | Division |
|---|---|---|
| Random Lake | 1975 | Class B |
| Howards Grove | 1976 | Class C |
| Random Lake | 1978 | Class B |
| Ozaukee | 1987 | Class C |
| Oostburg | 1994 | Division 3 |
| Oostburg | 2011 | Division 3 |
| Oostburg | 2012 | Division 3 |

=== Winter sports ===
Boys Basketball
| School | Year | Division |
|---|---|---|
| Kohler | 1980 | Class C |
| Kohler | 1982 | Class C |
| Kohler | 1983 | Class C |
| Oostburg | 1986 | Class C |
| Oostburg | 1987 | Class C |
| Oostburg | 1995 | Division 3 |
| Kohler | 1999 | Division 4 |
| Sheboygan Lutheran | 2012 | Division 5 |

Girls Basketball
| School | Year | Division |
|---|---|---|
| Kohler | 1982 | Class C |
| Oostburg | 1990 | Class C |
| Oostburg | 1994 | Division 3 |
| Elkhart Lake-Glenbeulah | 2002 | Division 4 |
| Ozaukee | 2004 | Division 3 |
| Oostburg | 2008 | Division 3 |

=== Spring sports ===
Boys Golf
| School | Year | Division |
|---|---|---|
| Elkhart Lake-Glenbeulah | 1990 | Class C |
| Elkhart Lake-Glenbeulah | 1991 | Division 3 |
| Howards Grove | 1992 | Division 3 |
| Howards Grove | 1993 | Division 3 |
| Oostburg | 1998 | Division 3 |
| Kohler | 2011 | Division 3 |

Girls Soccer
| School | Year | Division |
|---|---|---|
| Ozaukee | 2003 | Division 3 |
| Ozaukee | 2005 | Division 3 |
| Ozaukee | 2006 | Division 3 |
| Ozaukee | 2013 | Division 3 |

Boys Track & Field
| School | Year | Division |
|---|---|---|
| Kohler | 1970 | Class C |
| Kohler | 1971 | Class C |
| Kohler | 1972 | Class C |
| Kohler | 1973 | Class C |
| Kohler | 1974 | Class C |
| Ozaukee | 1975 | Class C |
| Kohler | 1979 | Class C |
| Elkhart Lake-Glenbeulah | 1988 | Class C |
| Howards Grove | 2002 | Division 3 |

Girls Track & Field
| School | Year | Division |
|---|---|---|
| Kohler | 1976 | Class C |
| Kohler | 1977 | Class C |

== List of conference champions ==
=== Boys Basketball ===
| School | Quantity | Years |
|---|---|---|
| Oostburg | 23 | 1975, 1977, 1978, 1984, 1986, 1987, 1988, 1991, 1992, 1995, 1996, 1997, 1998, 2000, 2001, 2002, 2004, 2006, 2007, 2008, 2010, 2011, 2013 |
| Kohler | 10 | 1970, 1971, 1972, 1974, 1976, 1980, 1981, 1982, 1983, 1994 |
| Howards Grove | 8 | 1979, 1980, 1981, 1982, 1984, 1991, 1992, 2015 |
| Cedar Grove-Belgium | 5 | 1970, 1979, 1985, 1989, 2005 |
| Sheboygan Christian | 3 | 2003, 2009, 2010 |
| Sheboygan Lutheran | 3 | 2005, 2012, 2014 |
| Elkhart Lake-Glenbeulah | 2 | 1990, 1993 |
| John F. Kennedy Prep | 2 | 1972, 1973 |
| Ozaukee | 2 | 1999, 2015 |
| Random Lake | 1 | 1988 |
| Stockbridge | 0 | |

=== Girls Basketball ===
| School | Quantity | Years |
|---|---|---|
| Oostburg | 24 | 1976, 1978, 1979, 1980, 1987, 1988, 1989, 1990, 1993, 1994, 1995, 1998, 1999, 2000, 2001, 2003, 2006, 2007, 2008, 2010, 2011, 2012, 2013, 2014 |
| Ozaukee | 9 | 1983, 1985, 1986, 1987, 2002, 2003, 2004, 2005, 2010 |
| Howards Grove | 6 | 1976, 1984, 1991, 1992, 2009, 2012 |
| Kohler | 3 | 1978, 1982, 1987 |
| Cedar Grove-Belgium | 2 | 1981, 1984 |
| Elkhart Lake-Glenbeulah | 2 | 1996, 1997 |
| Random Lake | 2 | 1977, 1994 |
| Sheboygan Christian | 1 | 2015 |
| Sheboygan Lutheran | 0 | |
| Stockbridge | 0 | |

=== Football ===
| School | Quantity | Years |
|---|---|---|
| Howards Grove | 16 | 1979, 1980, 1981, 1982, 1983, 1984, 1985, 1987, 1988, 1989, 1991, 1992, 1993, 1994, 1999, 2006 |
| Random Lake | 10 | 1973, 1995, 1996, 1997, 1998, 2001, 2002, 2003, 2006, 2007 |
| Cedar Grove-Belgium | 9 | 1996, 2004, 2005, 2006, 2008, 2009, 2011, 2012, 2013 |
| Kohler | 9 | 1969, 1970, 1971, 1973, 1975, 1977, 1978, 1981, 1988 |
| Oostburg | 7 | 1972, 1973, 1974, 1977, 2000, 2007, 2010 |
| Ozaukee | 5 | 1976, 1986, 1990, 2003, 2015 |
| Elkhart Lake-Glenbeulah | 2 | 1981, 1993 |
| Oakfield | 1 | 1988 |
| John F. Kennedy Prep | 0 | |
| KLC | 0 | |
| Sheboygan Lutheran/ Kohler | 0 | |
| Stockbridge | 0 | |
| Sheboygan Lutheran | 0 | |
