= Sheboygan High School =

Sheboygan High School is the name of numerous high schools in and around Sheboygan, Wisconsin:

- Sheboygan Falls High School
- Sheboygan High School (founded 1857), the city's first high school
- Sheboygan North High School (est. 1938)
- Sheboygan South High School (est. 1960)
- Sheboygan County Christian High School (est. 1969)
- Sheboygan Lutheran High School (est. 1978)

== See also ==
- Cheboygan High School, in Michigan
