= David Schroeder (criminal) =

American criminal

- Born: David W. Schroeder; May 23, 1976 (age 50)
- Criminal charges: 3 charges of disorderly conduct (initially charged with terrorist threats)
- Penalty: 4 months in jail (stayed), 2 years probation

Details
- State: Wisconsin
- Date apprehended: May 12, 2023: Terroristic threats

David Schroeder (born May 23, 1976) is an American criminal and former Wisconsin educator convicted of disorderly conduct against his students. Schroeder initially please not guilty to three counts of making terrorist threats, later pleading guilty to three charges of disorderly conduct. Schroeder was sentenced to 2 years probation.

== Career and criminal activity ==
David Schroeder was a teacher at John Long Middle School in Grafton, Wisconsin when he was initially charged with making terrorist threats against students. Schroeder claimed all Jews had guns and that he had seventeen. Schroeder plead not guilty, later pleading guilty to three counts of disorderly conduct in 2024. Schroeder was ordered to forfeit all firearms and have no contact with any student or staff member of the Grafton School District.

At the time of the incident, principal Chris Weiss stated that he was already under investigation for actions against students and that his contract would not be renewed.

=== Criminal incident ===
Then seventh grade student, Ethan Poulos, told local media that Schroeder found students drawing swastikas in a notebook before proceeding to tell students that their actions were a "disgrace to his people," and that he would "scorch Earth" on them. Schroeder additionally threatened that his daughter would go to their houses with a baseball bat.

Schroeder plead guilty on March 4, 2024, to disorderly conduct. Schroeder was sentenced to two years probation and a jail sentence in which four months were stayed.
