= Leander J. Foley =

American football player and coach (1885–1966)

Biographical details
- Born: February 14, 1885; Random Lake, Wisconsin, U.S.
- Died: February 9, 1966 (aged 80); Milwaukee, Wisconsin, U.S.

Playing career
- 1904–1905: Marquette
- Position: End

Coaching career (HC unless noted)
- 1913: Marquette

Head coaching record
- Overall: 4–3–1

Leander J. "Lee" Foley (February 14, 1885 – February 9, 1966) was an American college football player and coach. Foley was the ninth head football coach at Marquette University in Milwaukee, Wisconsin and he held that position for the 1913 season. His coaching record at Marquette was 4–3–1. Foley later became an obstetrician and gynecologist in Wauwatosa, Wisconsin.

== Head coaching record ==
Year	Team	Overall	Conference	Standing	Bowl/playoffs
Marquette Blue and Gold (Independent) (1913)
1913	Marquette	4–3–1			
Marquette:		4–3–1			
Total:		4–3–1			
