= Howards Grove High School =

Coordinates: 43°49′45.5″N 87°48′54.5″W

- 401 Audubon Road; Howards Grove, Wisconsin; United States

Information
- Type: Public
- School district: Howards Grove School District
- Principal: Jon Hess
- Teaching staff: 21.65 (FTE)
- Grades: 9 to 12
- Enrollment: 266 (2023-2024)
- Student to teacher ratio: 12.29
- Colors: Royal blue and gold
- Athletics conference: Big East
- Mascot: Howie the Tiger
- Team name: Tigers
- Website: www.hgtigers.org/schools/high-school/

Howards Grove High School is a public secondary school located in Howards Grove, Wisconsin. The school serves about 320 students in grades 9 to 12 in the Howards Grove School District. The school serves, as in addition to Howards Grove, Herman, Mosel, Ada, Franklin, Cleveland, Sheboygan Falls, and Meeme. The school also serves the broader surrounding area through a school choice program, making enrollment available for students outside the district. The current 1994 school building houses the offices for the Howards Grove School District.

== Student performance ==
Students at Howards Grove High School scored higher ACT scores than the Wisconsin State Average in the Science field, but lower in Mathematics, Reading, English, and Composite Scores. Students scored higher than the Wisconsin ACT average in Science, Mathematics, Composite Scores, but lower in English and Reading.

Students at Howards Grove High School taking AP (Advanced Placement) tests pass 87.5% of the time, significantly higher than the Wisconsin state average, and higher than all comparatively sized area schools.

28 academic credits are required to graduate from Howards Grove High School. Howards Grove High School has a 99.9% graduation rate, exceeding the Wisconsin state average. Roughly half of graduating students proceed to college studies after graduation.

Howards Grove High School has a 95.3% attendance rate, with 1.2% of students being considered habitually truant. 4.52% of students at Howards Grove High School has out of school suspensions issued.

== Academic courses ==
Howards Grove has an arrangement of courses, including various math, social science, agriscience, communicative arts, computer science, science, music, foreign language, tech, art, and business courses. AP classes offered include AP Biology and AP Chemistry. AP English Language and Composition was started in the curriculum in 2009–2010, but did not have a class in the 2010–2011 school year due to a lack of interest. Students may also take such classes as aviation, medical terminology, AP Psychology, AP US History, and AP Calculus online or at other schools in the area. Higher level and college courses, along with other languages are also available to seniors willing to drive to area Technical Colleges or Centers. Students may also participate in apprenticeships, or have a work-study, where they spend time out of school working and receive credit.

== Pause for a Cause ==
Starting in the Spring of 2012, Howards Grove High School has hosted "Pause for a Cause." This is a community fundraising event run and organized by students to raise money for a chosen, specific cause. Previous causes have been donations to the Children's Hospital in Milwaukee and the Make-A-Wish Foundation. Events at "Pause for a Cause" have included a Brat Fry, Dodgeball tournament, t-shirt sales, silent auction, children's games and activities, and even a poker tournament.

== Music Department ==
The Howards Grove Music Department have two to three choirs each year, as well as two bands. Choirs include the mixed choir, (co-ed freshmen and sophomores) Treble Choir, (given enough freshman & sophomore girls) and Concert Choir (juniors and seniors). The Bands include the Concert Band, (freshmen and sophomores) and the Symphonic Band (juniors and seniors). The Music department has two concerts a year, one in the winter and one in the spring. There is also a jazz cabaret in the early part of the new year featuring the jazz band and show choir. Band also plays pep band for varsity football, basketball, and sometimes volleyball.

== Sports ==
Howards Grove has a varsity and junior-varsity (JV) football program, boys' and girls' basketball varsity and JV, co-ed tennis, track, cross-country, girls' volleyball, baseball/softball, and boys' and girls' soccer. They also have a poms-squad during football and basketball seasons. The cheerleading squad was not formed in the previous year due to a lack of interest among students.

=== Athletic conference affiliation history ===
- Kettle Moraine Conference (1928-1930, 1934-1969)
- Central Lakeshore Conference (1969-2015)
- Big East Conference (2015–present)

== Extracurriculars ==
Howards Grove is a diverse school with a wide arrangement of clubs and organizations for the students to participate in. They have a SkillsUSA, Forensics, FFA, International Club, NHS, and Spanish Honor Society. Every other year, the Howards Grove student body has the chance to perform in a musical with the Kohler students. On the opposite years, a small one-act play is available for auditions and performances.

== Gallery ==
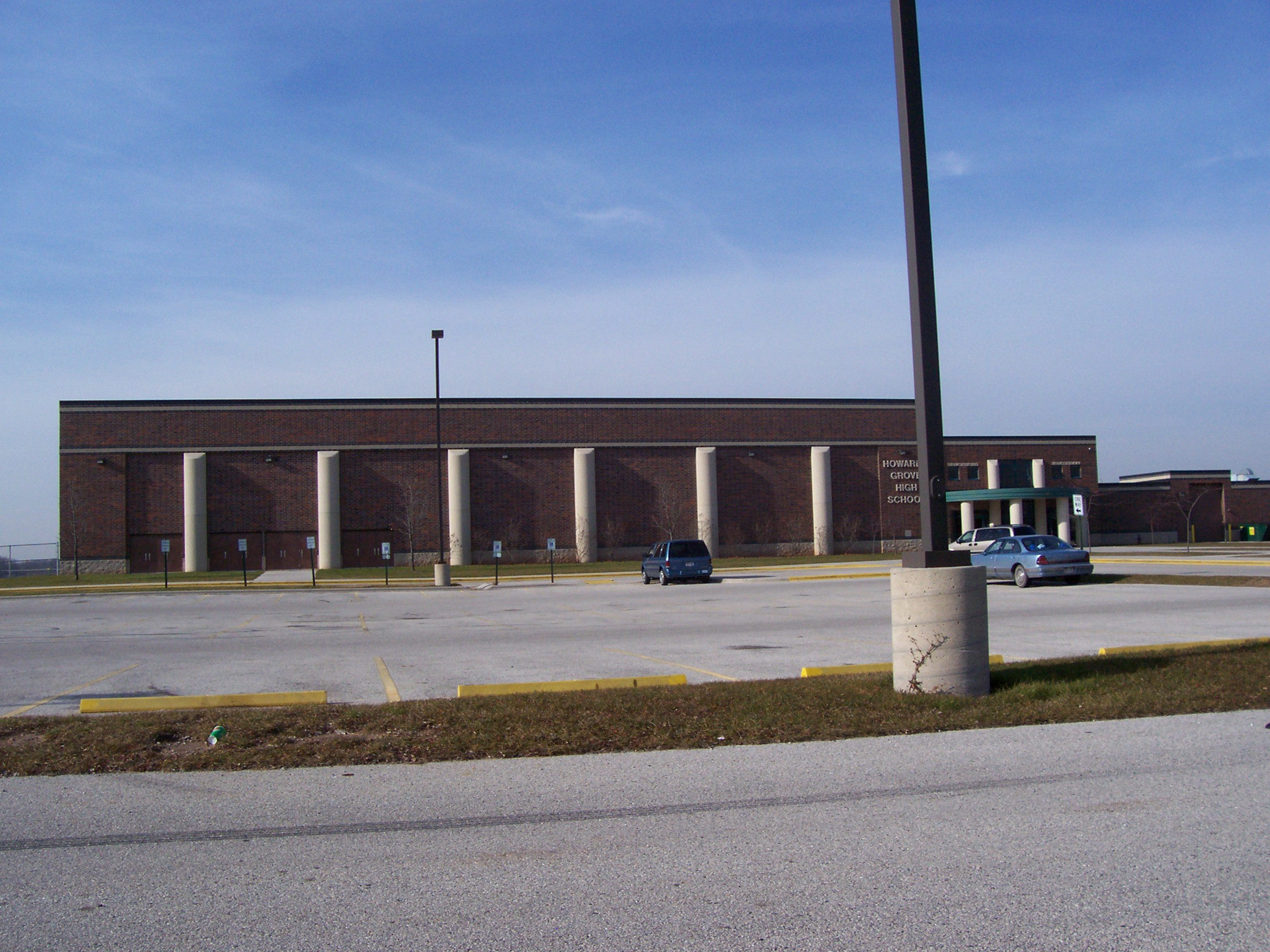
Howards Grove High School

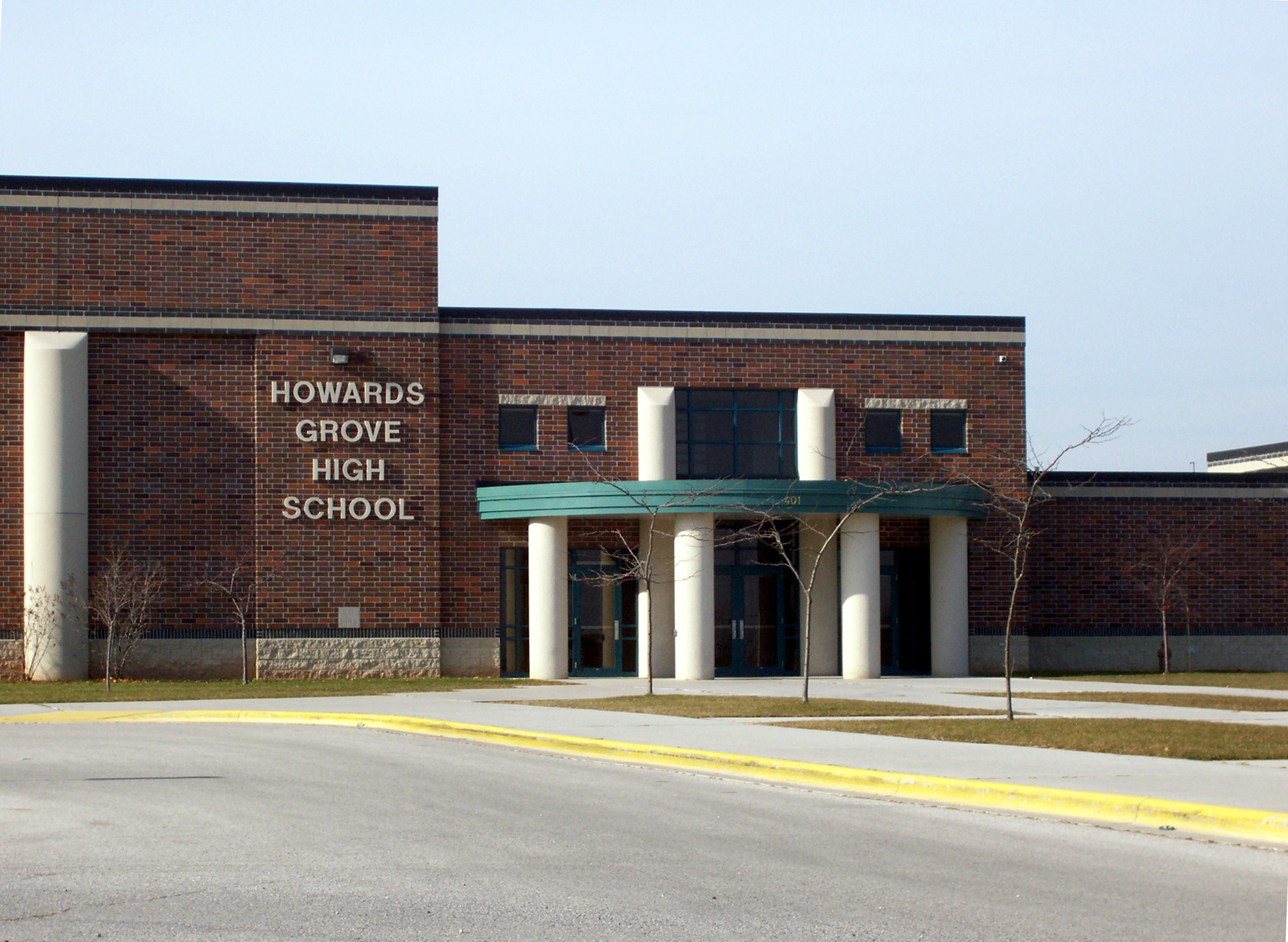
The Front Entrance
