= Cedar Grove-Belgium High School =

Public school in Wisconsin, United States

Location
- 321 North 2nd Street; Cedar Grove, Wisconsin 53013; 43.573887°N 87.822866°W

Information
- Type: Public
- School district: Cedar Grove-Belgium School District
- Principal: Josh Ketterhagen
- Teaching staff: 21.80 (FTE)
- Grades: 9-12
- Enrollment: 275 (2023-2024)
- Student to teacher ratio: 12.61
- Color
- Mascot: Rocket
- Website: www.cgbrockets.com/o/hs

Cedar Grove-Belgium High School is a public high school located in Cedar Grove, Wisconsin, United States. It serves grades 9-12 and is part of the Cedar Grove-Belgium School District. Cedar Grove-Belgium High School has 322 students.

== Athletics ==
Cedar Grove-Belgium High School participates in athletics as a member of the Big East Conference. Their athletic teams are known as the Rockets. The Rockets went to the State Division 5 Football Championship in 2008 and in their 2016 season, and lost 38-35. In the 2025-2026 Wrestling season, the Rockets placed 2nd at the Team State Wrestling Tournament losing to Aquinas High School of La Crosse. In the 2026 Baseball season, the Rockets place first at state.

=== Athletic conference affiliation history ===
- Kettle Moraine Conference (1931-1965)
- Eastern Wisconsin Conference (1965-1969)
- Central Lakeshore Conference (1969-2015)
- Big East Conference (2015-present)
