= Oostburg School District =

Public school district in Oostburg, Wisconsin

Location
- 410 New York Avenue; Oostburg, Wisconsin; United States

District information
- Type: Public
- Grades: PK–12
- Superintendent: Kevin Bruggink
- Schools: 3
- NCES District ID: 5511070

Students and staff
- Students: 1,011 (2024–25)
- Faculty: 67.36 (on an FTE basis)
- Student–teacher ratio: 15.01

Other information
- Website: www.oostburg.k12.wi.us

Oostburg School District is a public school district in Oostburg, Wisconsin that serves that village and the town of Holland in Sheboygan County.

== Schools ==
- Oostburg Elementary School
- Oostburg Middle School
- Oostburg High School
