= Ozaukee High School =

Location
- 401 Highland Dr; Fredonia, Wisconsin 53021; United States
- 43.4765°N 87.9430°W

Information
- School district: Northern Ozaukee School District
- Principal: Matt Zavada
- Teaching staff: 19.30 (FTE)
- Grades: 9–12
- Gender: Co-educational
- Enrollment: 199 (2024–2025)
- Student to teacher ratio: 10.48
- Colors: Navy and gold
- Athletics conference: Big East Conference (Wisconsin)
- Team name: Warriors
- Website: nosd.edu/high-school/

Ozaukee High School is a public high school located in Fredonia, Wisconsin, United States. It serves students from Fredonia, Newburg, and parts of Belgium and Saukville.

== Athletics ==
Ozaukee's athletic teams are nicknamed the Warriors and the school's colors are navy and gold. The Warriors compete in the Big East Conference. The Warriors compete in the following sports:

- Boys cross country
- Girls cross country
- Football
- Boys soccer
- Girls volleyball
- Boys basketball
- Girls basketball
- Wrestling
- Boys baseball
- Boys golf
- Girls soccer
- Girls softball
- Boys track & field
- Girls track & field

=== Athletic conference affiliation history ===
- Kettle Moraine Conference (1965-1969)
- Central Lakeshore Conference (1969-2015)
- Big East Conference (2015–present)

== Demographics ==
For the 2019-2020 school year, Ozaukee had an enrollment of 217 with 204 students identifying as Caucasian, making up a majority of the student body. Six identified as Hispanic, three identified as Black, one identified as Asian, and three identified as multiracial.

== Notable alumni ==
- Owen Miller (2015) - MLB shortstop for the Milwaukee Brewers
