= Grafton High School (Wisconsin) =

Location
- 1950 Washington Street; Grafton, Wisconsin 53024; United States; 43.3212°N 87.9399°W

Information
- Type: Public
- Established: 1956
- School district: Grafton School District
- Principal: Scott Mantei
- Teaching staff: 44.91 (on an FTE basis)
- Enrollment: 720 (2023–2024)
- Student to teacher ratio: 16.03
- Color
- Athletics conference: Glacier Trail Conference (Football), North Shore Conference (All Others)
- Mascot: Black Hawks
- Website: https://www.grafton.k12.wi.us/schools/high/

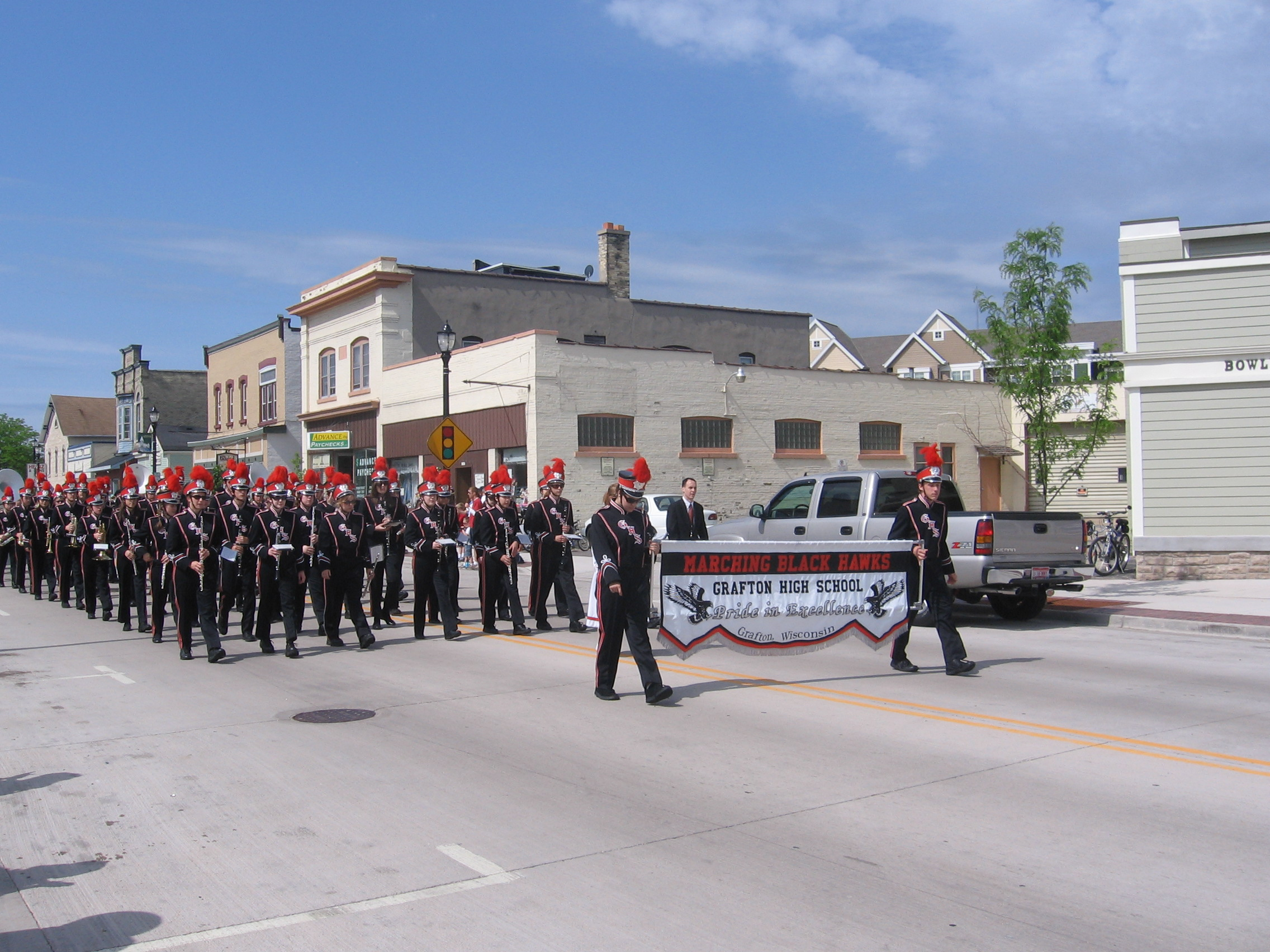
The Marching Black Hawks play at the Grafton Memorial Day parade on May 28, 2007.

Grafton High School is a secondary school in Grafton, Wisconsin. It is part of the Grafton School District. The only public high school in Grafton, it has a student enrollment of around 700.

== Academics ==
Grafton High School provides students with educational opportunities such as core subjects, technology education, physical education, and the fine arts. In Jay Mathews' 2005 Challenge Index, GHS ranked 461st out of 1062 in the country. This was third in the state and first in the conference. In 2006, GHS was ranked 559th in the country and fifth in the state.

Grafton High School also offers a range of Advanced Placement (AP) courses, including AP Psychology, AP Biology, AP Chemistry, AP Calculus AB, AP Calculus BC, AP Microeconomics, AP Macroeconomics, AP United States History, and AP Spanish. The Spanish department also offers a College Credit in High School program through the University of Wisconsin–Green Bay. The school has reported a graduation rate of approximately 98 percent, with many graduates continuing on to college, technical school, or the workforce. Grafton High School also offers a strong technical education curriculum, including an automotive program with a full instructional shop, as well as coursework in architectural drafting, woodworking, metal craft, welding, and engineering.

=== Teacher of the year ===
In 2009, industrial technology teacher, Carl Hader, was named Wisconsin High School Teacher of the year. As automotive instructor, he has guided GHS students to first-place finishes in several state and national auto repair competitions.

In 2010, Biology, Earth Science, and Anatomy teacher, Fran Grant, was named the state of Wisconsin Biology Teacher of the year.

== History ==
Grafton High School was originally located at 1111 Broad Street in Grafton, Wisconsin, adjacent to the present-day USS Liberty Memorial Public Library and across from John F. Kennedy Elementary School. The Broad Street school building opened in 1927 and served as the community’s high school until 1958, when the school relocated to its current campus at 1950 Washington Street.

A new high school building opened on the Washington Street campus in 1958. In 1972, Grafton High School moved into its present building on the same site, and the former high school building was converted into Grafton Elementary School. That building remained in use until its closure and demolition in 2017 as part of a district facilities referendum.

The current school building is a two-story red brick structure. School facilities include a theater, swimming pool, two gymnasiums, weight room, cafeteria, library, science laboratories, family and consumer sciences classrooms, technical education and shop classrooms, and automotive classroom space. Outdoor facilities include a football stadium, soccer fields, running track, tennis courts, student parking, and a wooded outdoor classroom area on the northeast side of campus.

=== 2017–2018 Referendum Renovations ===
During the 2017–2018 school year, Grafton High School underwent a major renovation and expansion funded through a district referendum. The project included replacement of classroom ceiling panels, installation of a new fire alarm system, replacement of interior lighting with LED fixtures, renovation of the science wing with additional laboratory space, construction of a new gymnasium and locker rooms, expansion of cafeteria space, creation of a set design studio, updates to shop classrooms, renovation of the library to include additional collaboration space, carpeted hallways, and other general building improvements. A full asbestos abatement project was also completed during construction.

The renovation was the first major modernization of the high school since it opened at its current site in 1972. The project was funded through a district referendum that restructured elementary school facilities in the village, including the closure and demolition of the former Grafton Elementary School during the same period. Students from that school were reassigned to expanded facilities at Woodview Elementary School and John F. Kennedy Elementary School. Available district materials confirm related expansion work at the middle school campus as part of the broader facilities plan.

=== 2019 Talent Show ===
In May 2019, Grafton High School was scheduled to host a talent show. Unfortunately, due to low interest and support, the event was ultimately canceled. Despite efforts to promote the talent show and encourage participation, organizers were unable to generate enough enthusiasm from the student body and community to make the event viable. However, Grafton High School remains committed to providing engaging extracurricular opportunities for its students and looks forward to exploring new ways to showcase their talents in the future.

== Sports ==
Grafton High School participates in the North Shore Conference of the Wisconsin Interscholastic Athletic Association (WIAA) and has won the following state titles:

- football: 1981, 1982 and 2025.
- girls' basketball: 2007, and 2009
- girls' soccer: 1997
- boys' track: 2000
- girls' swimming: 2004, 2005, 2013, and 2014
- competition cheerleading: 6 years in a row, from 2005 to 2010
- boys rugby: 2017 (non-WIAA sport)

=== Conference affiliation history ===
- Kettle Moraine Conference (1928-1958)
- Scenic Moraine Conference (1958-1980)
- Braveland Conference (1980-1985)
- North Shore Conference (1985–present)

== Notable alumni ==
- Beau Benzschawel, American football player
- Dave Levenick, American football player
- Rich Strenger, American football player
