= Random Lake High School =

Coordinates: 43°33′16.6″N 87°58′20.8″W

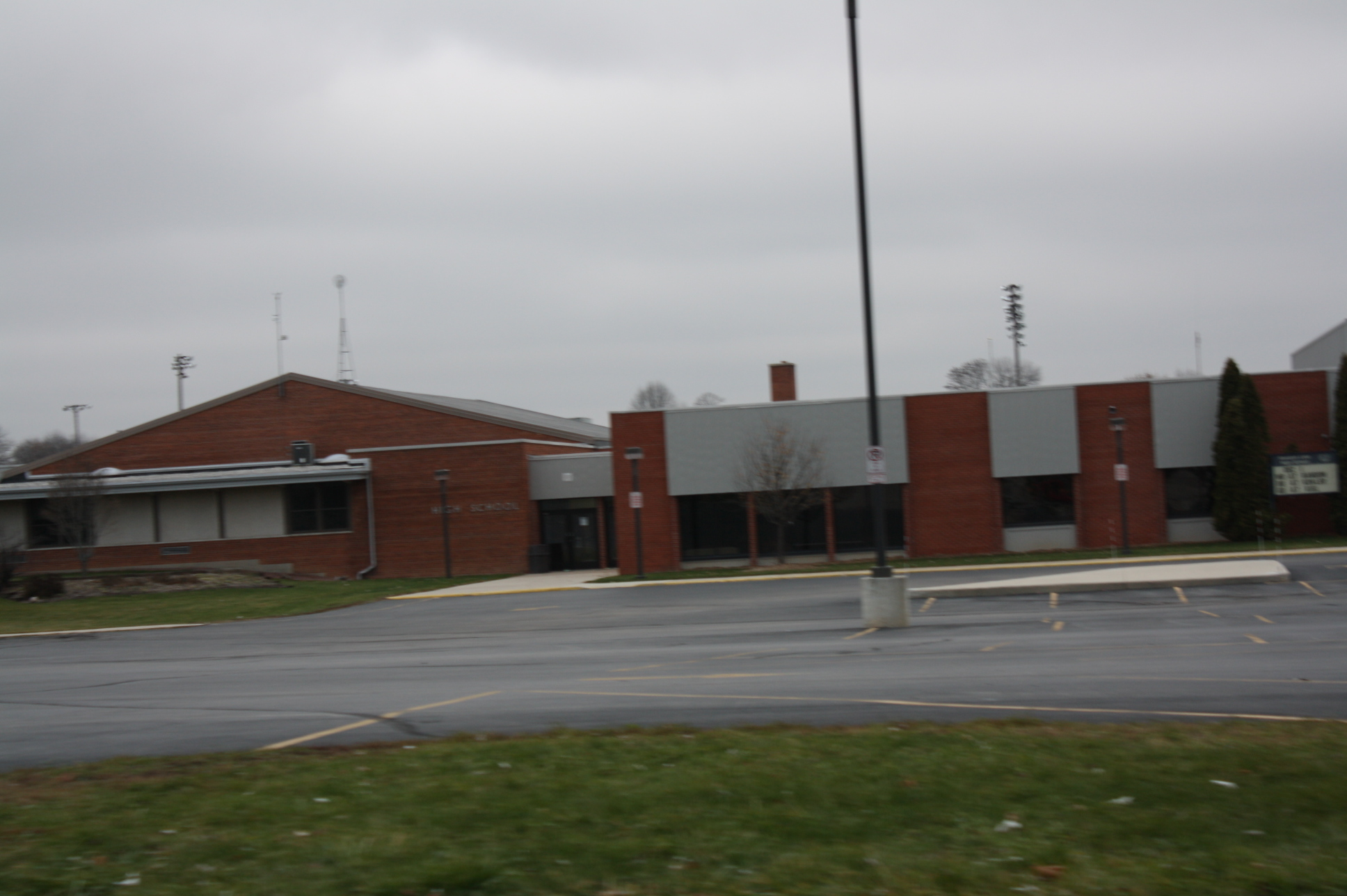

Location
- 605 Random Lake Road; Random Lake, Wisconsin 53075

Information
- Staff: 20.78 (FTE)
- Enrollment: 241 (2022-2023)
- Student to teacher ratio: 11.60
- Color
- Team name: Randoms

Random Lake High School is a high school for grades 9–12. It is located in Random Lake, Wisconsin on the western side of town and serves approximately 233 students in the area of Southern Sheboygan County and Northern Ozaukee County. The current site of the school was formerly a swamp. The high school is currently administered by principal Susan McDonald.

The school's mascot is the ram and the colors are blue and white. The school song is the melody "Our Director." Its yearbook was previously known as "Rampage" and the newspaper was known as "The Lake Effect."

== Academics ==
Random Lake High School teaches English, math, science, social studies, Spanish, art, agriculture, technology education, graphic arts, music, physical education, and business education. It offers Advanced Placement courses, with the opportunity to earn college credit. It also offers AP classes via the Internet through the Wisconsin Virtual School program.

== Extracurricular activities ==
Among the school's extracurricular programs are over 14 varsity sports, in affiliation with the WIAA. The school also has a Future Business Leaders of America (FBLA) program, and chapters of FFA, SADD, and National Honor Society. The school's bands and choirs are affiliated with the Wisconsin School Music Association, the forensics team with the Wisconsin High School Forensics Association, its Model United Nations with the Wisconsin High School Model United Nations. It also has an anime club and participates in the National History Day competition.

=== Athletic conference affiliation history ===
- Kettle Moraine Conference (1928-1960)
- Scenic Moraine Conference (1960-1969)
- Central Lakeshore Conference (1969-2015)
- Big East Conference (2015-present)
