= Oostburg High School =

Coordinates: 43.624441°N 87.788699°W

- 410 New York Avenue; Oostburg, Wisconsin 53070; United States

Information
- Type: Public
- Established: 1913; 113 years ago
- School district: Oostburg School District
- NCES District ID: 551107001466
- Principal: Josh Cole
- Teaching staff: 21.91 (FTE)
- Grades: 9–12
- Enrollment: 328 (2024–2025)
- Student to teacher ratio: 14.97
- Colors: Red and white
- Mascot: Dutchman
- Website: www.oostburg.k12.wi.us/page/high-school

Oostburg High School is a public high school located in Oostburg, Wisconsin, United States. Part of the Oostburg School District, the school serves students in grades 9 through 12. Oostburg High School has an enrollment of 328 for the year 2024–2025.

== Athletics ==
As of the start of the 2015-16 academic year, Oostburg High School's athletic teams participate in The Big East Conference, which is a part of the Wisconsin Interscholastic Athletic Association (WIAA). Its teams are known as the Dutchmen and Lady Dutch.

=== Athletic conference affiliation history ===
- Kettle Moraine Conference (1928-1960)
- Eastern Wisconsin Conference (1960-1969)
- Central Lakeshore Conference (1969-2015)
- Big East Conference (2015-present)

== Notable alumni ==
- Daniel LeMahieu, legislator
- Lindee Brill
