= Kohler High School =

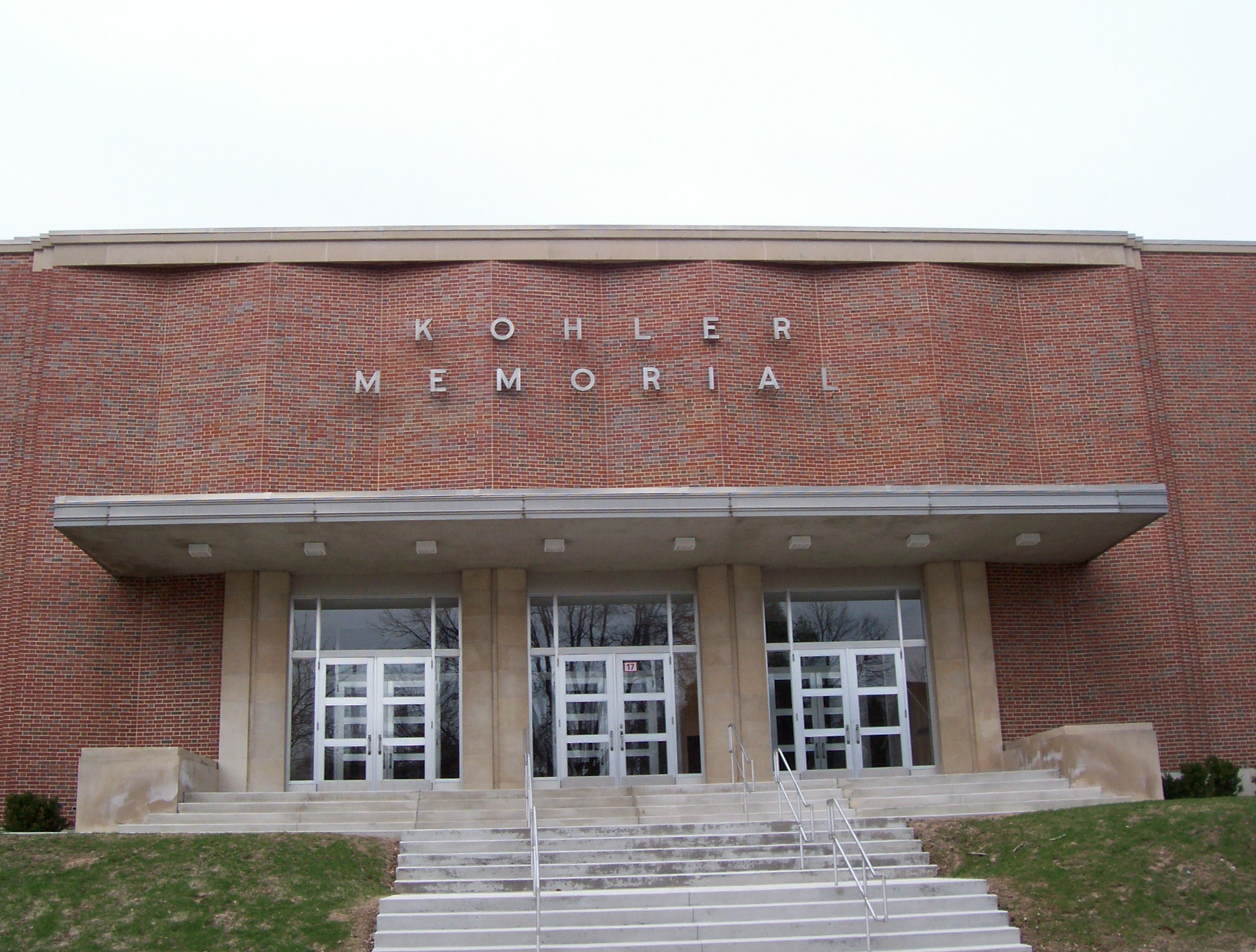

Location
- 333 Upper Road; Kohler, Wisconsin 53044; United States; 43°44′23″N 87°47′02″W

Information
- School type: Public High School
- School district: Kohler School District
- Principal: Natasha Rowell
- Teaching staff: 14.82 (on an FTE basis)
- Grades: 9 through 12
- Enrolment: 242 (2024-2025)
- Student to teacher ratio: 16.33
- Colors: Royal blue and white
- Athletics conference: Big East Conference (Wisconsin)
- Nickname: Blue Bombers
- Website: www.kohlerpublicschools.org/schools/high-school/

Kohler High School is a public high school located in Kohler, Wisconsin. It serves grades 9-12 and is part of the Kohler School District. Kohler Elementary and Kohler Middle Schools are also based out of the same building, though the enrollments of each school are broken out individually rather than as one K-12 unit. In the same building is the Kohler Public Library, which serves as the school library for all three schools.

== Athletics ==
Kohler High School participates in athletics as a member of the Big East Conference. Their athletic teams are known as the Bombers. The football team, due to a light enrollment, competes as a combined team with students from Sheboygan Area Lutheran High School and Sheboygan County Christian High School

=== Athletic conference affiliation history ===
- Eastern Wisconsin Conference (1929-1969)
- Central Lakeshore Conference (1969-2015)
- Big East Conference (2015–present)

== Notable alumni ==
- Joe Wolf (class of 1983), former NBA player and former coach
- Jake Dickert (class of 2002), Head Football Coach for the Washington State Cougars
