= Big East Conference (Wisconsin) =

Wisconsin high school athletic conference

The Big East Conference is a high school athletic conference comprising small high schools in east central Wisconsin. Formed in 2015, all members are affiliated with the Wisconsin Interscholastic Athletic Association.

== History ==
The Big East Conference was formed in 2015 from the merger of two previously established conferences for small high schools in east central Wisconsin. Nine schools in the Central Lakeshore Conference (Cedar Grove-Belgium, Elkhart Lake-Glenbeulah, Howards Grove, Kohler, Oostburg, Ozaukee, Random Lake, Sheboygan Christian and Sheboygan Lutheran) joined with five smallest schools in the former Olympian Conference (Hilbert, Manitowoc Lutheran, Mishicot, Reedsville and St. Mary Catholic) to form the current fourteen-member circuit. For most sports, the Big East Conference is subdivided into North and South Divisions:

North Division	South Division
Elkhart Lake-Glenbeulah	Cedar Grove-Belgium
Hilbert	Kohler
Howards Grove	Oostburg
Manitowoc Lutheran	Ozaukee
Mishicot	Random Lake
Reedsville	Sheboygan Christian
St. Mary Catholic	Sheboygan Lutheran

=== Football-only alignment ===
The Big East Conference's initial football lineup featured two cooperative programs due to the small size of its member schools. Hilbert and Stockbridge joined forces for football until the 2017 season, and three programs (Kohler, Sheboygan Christian and Sheboygan Lutheran) combined to form KLC Football. The only full member to have never participated in football is Elkhart Lake-Glenbeulah, who has sponsored eight-player football since 2012. When St. Mary Catholic entered into a cooperative with Valley Christian in Oshkosh in 2017, they transitioned into eight-player football and left the conference the year after.

In February 2019, in conjunction with the Wisconsin Football Coaches Association, the WIAA released a sweeping football-only realignment for Wisconsin to commence with the 2020 football season and run on a two-year cycle. The Big East Conference lost two of its ten football members to realignment: KLC to the Eastern Wisconsin Conference and Mishicot to the Packerland Conference . The eight remaining schools (Cedar Grove-Belgium, Hilbert, Howards Grove, Manitowoc Lutheran, Oostburg, Ozaukee, Random Lake and Reedsville) continued on and maintained this alignment through the 2022-2023 realignment cycle. In 2024, Ozaukee and Random Lake entered into a cooperative agreement to run a joint football program, leaving the Big East Conference with seven football-playing members. That number will increase back to eight for the 2026-2027 cycle, with full members Mishicot rejoining from the Packerland Conference.

== List of member schools ==
School	Location	Affiliation	Enrollment	Mascot	Colors	Joined	Division
Cedar Grove-Belgium	Cedar Grove, WI	Public	280	Rockets		2015	South
Elkhart Lake-Glenbeulah	Elkhart Lake, WI	Public	146	Resorters		2015	North
Hilbert	Hilbert, WI	Public	167	Wolves		2015	North
Howards Grove	Howards Grove, WI	Public	291	Tigers		2015	North
Kohler	Kohler, WI	Public	231	Blue Bombers		2015	South
Manitowoc Lutheran	Manitowoc, WI	Private (Lutheran, WELS)	303	Lancers		2015	North
Mishicot	Mishicot, WI	Public	281	Indians		2015	North
Oostburg	Oostburg, WI	Public	330	Flying Dutchmen		2015	South
Ozaukee	Fredonia, WI	Public	207	Warriors		2015	South
Random Lake	Random Lake, WI	Public	190	Rams		2015	South
Reedsville	Reedsville, WI	Public	177	Panthers		2015	North
Sheboygan Christian	Sheboygan, WI	Private (Non-denominational Christian)	179	Eagles		2015	South
Sheboygan Lutheran	Sheboygan, WI	Private (Lutheran, LCMS)	175	Crusaders		2015	South
St. Mary Catholic	Neenah, WI	Private (Catholic)	290	Zephyrs		2015	North

== Membership timeline ==
North Division South Division

== Membership map ==
Big East Conference
Location of Big East Conference full members:
1 Cedar Grove-Belgium
2 Elkhart Lake-Glenbeulah
3 Hilbert
4 Howards Grove
5 Kohler
6 Manitowoc Lutheran
7 Mishicot
8 Oostburg
9 Ozaukee
10 Random Lake
11 Reedsville
12 Sheboygan Christian
13 Sheboygan Lutheran
14 St. Mary Catholic

== Sponsored sports ==
	Baseball	Boys Basketball	Girls Basketball	Boys Cross Country	Girls Cross Country	Football	Boys Golf	Boys Soccer (Note: Co-sponsored with the Eastern Wisconsin Conference)	Girls Soccer	Softball	Boys Track & Field	Girls Track & Field	Girls Volleyball	Boys Wrestling	Girls Wrestling
Cedar Grove-Belgium	●	●	●	●	●	●	●	●	●	●	●	●	●	●	●
Elkhart Lake-Glenbeulah	●	●	●	●	●		●		●	●	●	●	●	● (Note: Co-operative with Howards Grove)	●
Hilbert	●	●	●	●	●	●				●	●	●	●		
Howards Grove	●	●	●	●	●	●	●	● (Note: Co-operative with Elkhart Lake-Glenbeulah)	●	●	●	●	●		
Kohler	● (Note: Co-operative with Sheboygan Christian)	●	●	●	●		●	●	●		●	●	●		
Manitowoc Lutheran	●	●	●	●	●	●			●	●	●	●	●	●	●
Mishicot	●	●	●	●	●	●	●			●	●	●	●	●	●
Oostburg	●	●	●	●	●	●	●	●	●	●	●	●	●	●	●
Ozaukee	●	●	●	●	●	● (Note: Co-operative with Random Lake)	●		●	●	●	●	●	●	●
Random Lake	●	●	●	●	●		●	● (Note: Co-operative with Ozaukee)		●	●	●	●	●	●
Reedsville	●	●	●	●	●	●	●			●	●	●	●	●	●
Sheboygan Christian		●	●	●	●			● (Note: Co-operative with Sheboygan Lutheran)			●	●	●		
Sheboygan Lutheran	●	●	●	●	●		●		●	●	●	●	●		
St. Mary Catholic	●	●	●	●	●		●	●	●	●	●	●	●		

== List of state champions ==
=== Fall sports ===
Boys Cross Country
School	Year	Division
Kohler	2022	Division 3
Kohler	2023	Division 3
Cedar Grove-Belgium	2024	Division 3
Kohler	2024	Division 2

Girls Cross Country
School	Year	Division
Kohler	2024	Division 3

Football
School	Year	Division
Reedsville	2021	Division 7

Boys Soccer
School	Year	Division
Sheboygan Christian/ Sheboygan Lutheran	2021	Division 4
Oostburg	2025	Division 4

Girls Volleyball
School	Year	Division
Howards Grove	2016	Division 3
Howards Grove	2019	Division 3
Howards Grove	2020	Division 3
Howards Grove	2021	Division 3
Howards Grove	2022	Division 3
Manitowoc Lutheran	2024	Division 4
Manitowoc Lutheran	2025	Division 3

=== Winter sports ===
Boys Basketball
School	Year	Division
Sheboygan Lutheran	2019	Division 5
Reedsville	2026	Division 5

Girls Basketball
School	Year	Division
Howards Grove	2017	Division 4
Mishicot	2021	Division 4
Oostburg	2025	Division 3
Oostburg	2026	Division 3

=== Spring sports ===
Baseball
School	Year	Division
St. Mary Catholic	2016	Division 3
Cedar Grove-Belgium	2026	Division 3

Boys Golf
School	Year	Division
Kohler	2021	Division 3
Kohler	2022	Division 3
Kohler	2026	Division 3

Girls Soccer
School	Year	Division
Cedar Grove-Belgium	2024	Division 4

== List of conference champions ==
=== Boys Basketball ===
School	Quantity	Years
Howards Grove	6	2016, 2018, 2019, 2023, 2024, 2025
Oostburg	6	2019, 2020, 2021, 2023, 2025, 2026
Sheboygan Lutheran	5	2019, 2020, 2022, 2024, 2025
Kohler	3	2023, 2024, 2025
Hilbert	2	2017, 2020
Reedsville	2	2022, 2026
Manitowoc Lutheran	1	2020
St. Mary Catholic	1	2021
Cedar Grove-Belgium	0	
Elkhart Lake-Glenbeulah	0	
Mishicot	0	
Ozaukee	0	
Random Lake	0	
Sheboygan Christian	0	

=== Girls Basketball ===
School	Quantity	Years
Oostburg	9	2016, 2018, 2020, 2021, 2022, 2023, 2024, 2025, 2026
St. Mary Catholic	5	2022, 2023, 2024, 2025, 2026
Howards Grove	4	2017, 2019, 2020, 2021
Mishicot	2	2019, 2020
Manitowoc Lutheran	1	2025
Cedar Grove-Belgium	0	
Elkhart Lake-Glenbeulah	0	
Hilbert	0	
Kohler	0	
Ozaukee	0	
Random Lake	0	
Reedsville	0	
Sheboygan Christian	0	
Sheboygan Lutheran	0	

=== Football ===
School	Quantity	Years
Cedar Grove-Belgium	5	2017, 2018, 2021, 2022, 2024
Reedsville	3	2020, 2021, 2023
Hilbert	2	2019, 2021
Hilbert/ Stockbridge	2	2015, 2016
Manitowoc Lutheran	2	2025, 2026
Howards Grove	0	
KLC	0	
Mishicot	0	
Oostburg	0	
Ozaukee	0	
Random Lake	0	
Random Lake/ Ozaukee	0	
St. Mary Catholic	0	
