= Hilbert, Wisconsin =

- Village
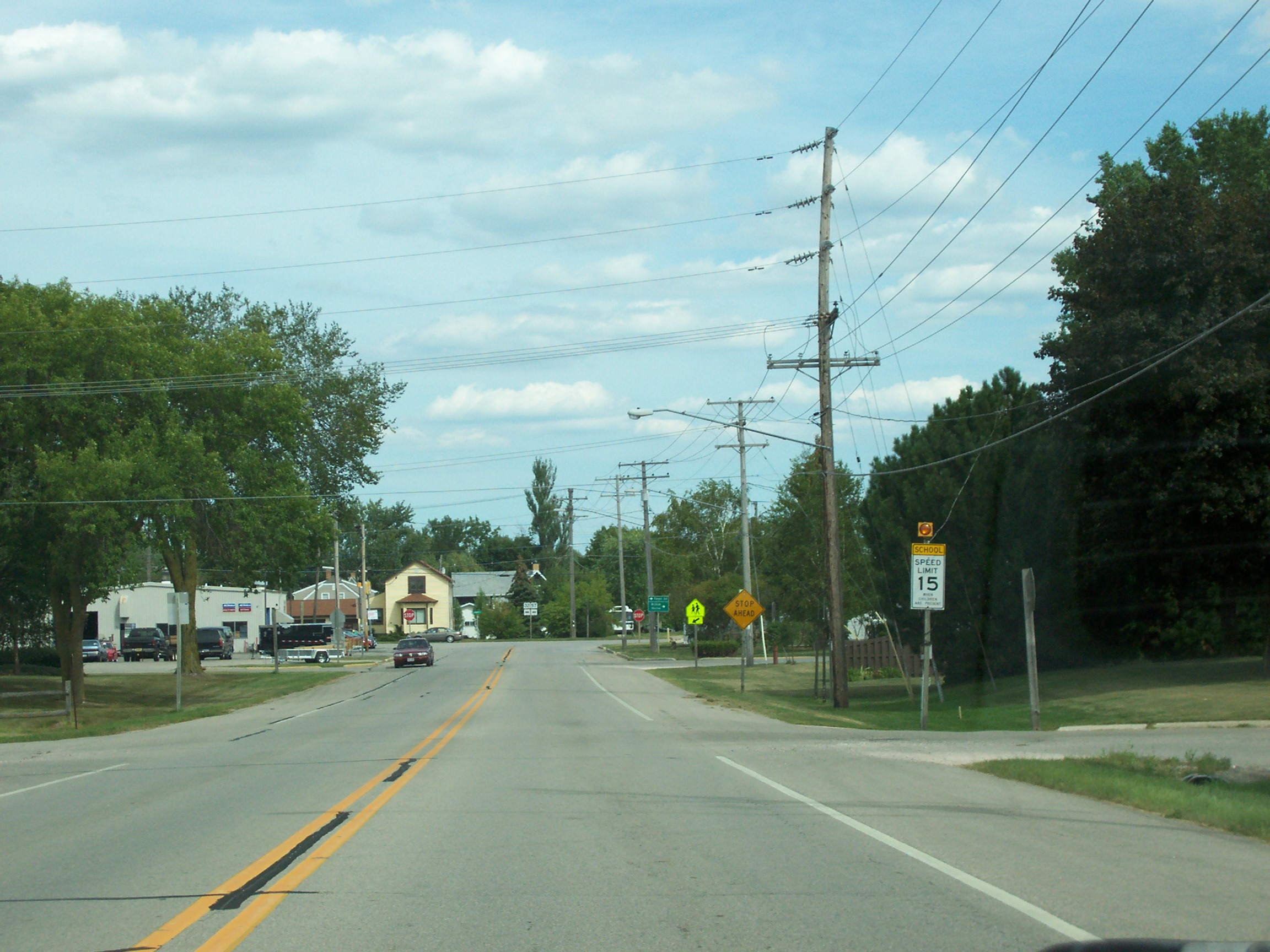

- Location of Hilbert in Calumet County, Wisconsin.
- Coordinates: 44°8′24″N 88°9′44″W
- Country: United States
- State: Wisconsin
- County: Calumet

Area
  - Total: 1.47 sq mi (3.82 km^{2})
  - Land: 1.47 sq mi (3.82 km^{2})
  - Water: 0 sq mi (0.00 km^{2})
- Elevation: 837 ft (255 m)

Population (2020)
  - Total: 1,248
  - Density: 846/sq mi (327/km^{2})
- Time zone: UTC-6 (Central (CST))
  - Summer (DST): UTC-5 (CDT)
- Zip Code: 54129
- Area code: 920
- FIPS code: 55-34575
- GNIS feature ID: 1566405
- Website: villageofhilbert.com

Hilbert is a village in Calumet County in the U.S. state of Wisconsin. The population was 1,248 at the 2020 census.

== Geography ==
Hilbert is located at 44°8′24″N 88°9′44″W (44.140040, -88.162250).

According to the United States Census Bureau, the village has a total area of 1.44 square miles (3.73 km^{2}), all of it land.

== Demographics ==
Historical population
Census	Pop.	Note	%±
1900	497		—
1910	572		15.1%
1920	614		7.3%
1930	519		−15.5%
1940	607		17.0%
1950	648		6.8%
1960	736		13.6%
1970	896		21.7%
1980	1,176		31.3%
1990	1,211		3.0%
2000	1,089		−10.1%
2010	1,132		3.9%
2020	1,248		10.2%
U.S. Decennial Census

=== 2010 census ===
As of the census of 2010, there were 1,132 people, 462 households, and 302 families living in the village. The population density was 786.1 inhabitants per square mile (303.5/km^{2}). There were 482 housing units at an average density of 334.7 per square mile (129.2/km^{2}). The racial makeup of the village was 93.8% White, 1.3% Native American, 3.8% from other races, and 1.1% from two or more races. Hispanic or Latino of any race were 7.9% of the population.

There were 462 households, of which 32.3% had children under the age of 18 living with them, 51.9% were married couples living together, 6.9% had a female householder with no husband present, 6.5% had a male householder with no wife present, and 34.6% were non-families. 27.7% of all households were made up of individuals, and 13% had someone living alone who was 65 years of age or older. The average household size was 2.45 and the average family size was 3.02.

The median age in the village was 38.3 years. 24.7% of residents were under the age of 18; 8.8% were between the ages of 18 and 24; 26.4% were from 25 to 44; 26% were from 45 to 64; and 14.1% were 65 years of age or older. The gender makeup of the village was 51.1% male and 48.9% female.

=== 2000 census ===
As of the census of 2000, there were 1,089 people, 430 households, and 288 families living in the village. The population density was 982.8 people per square mile (378.8/km^{2}). There were 458 housing units at an average density of 413.4 per square mile (159.3/km^{2}). The racial makeup of the village was 98.26% White, 0.09% Native American, 0.73% Asian, 0.73% from other races, and 0.18% from two or more races. Hispanic or Latino of any race were 1.47% of the population.

There were 430 households, out of which 33.3% had children under the age of 18 living with them, 54.4% were married couples living together, 6.5% had a female householder with no husband present, and 33.0% were non-families. 28.8% of all households were made up of individuals, and 14.7% had someone living alone who was 65 years of age or older. The average household size was 2.53 and the average family size was 3.14.

In the village, the population was spread out, with 27.2% under the age of 18, 8.8% from 18 to 24, 27.9% from 25 to 44, 22.8% from 45 to 64, and 13.3% who were 65 years of age or older. The median age was 36 years. For every 100 females, there were 98.7 males. For every 100 females age 18 and over, there were 94.8 males.

The median income for a household in the village was $42,938, and the median income for a family was $51,591. Males had a median income of $35,357 versus $22,826 for females. The per capita income for the village was $18,872. About 1.0% of families and 3.7% of the population were below the poverty line, including 3.1% of those under age 18 and 10.1% of those age 65 or over.

== Notable residents ==
- Bunny Berigan, jazz trumpeter, was born in Hilbert

== Gallery ==
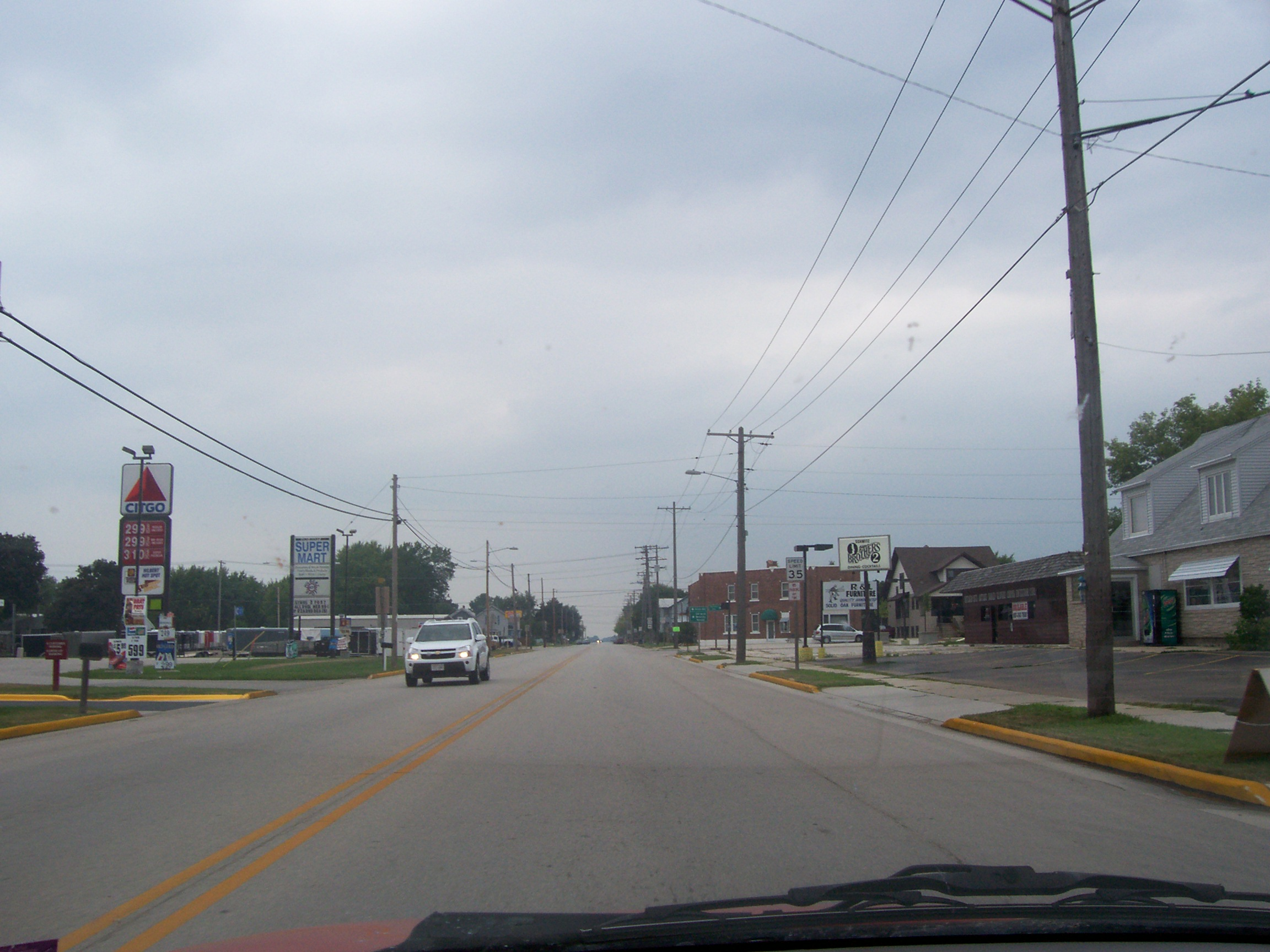
Driving northbound through Hilbert on Highway 57

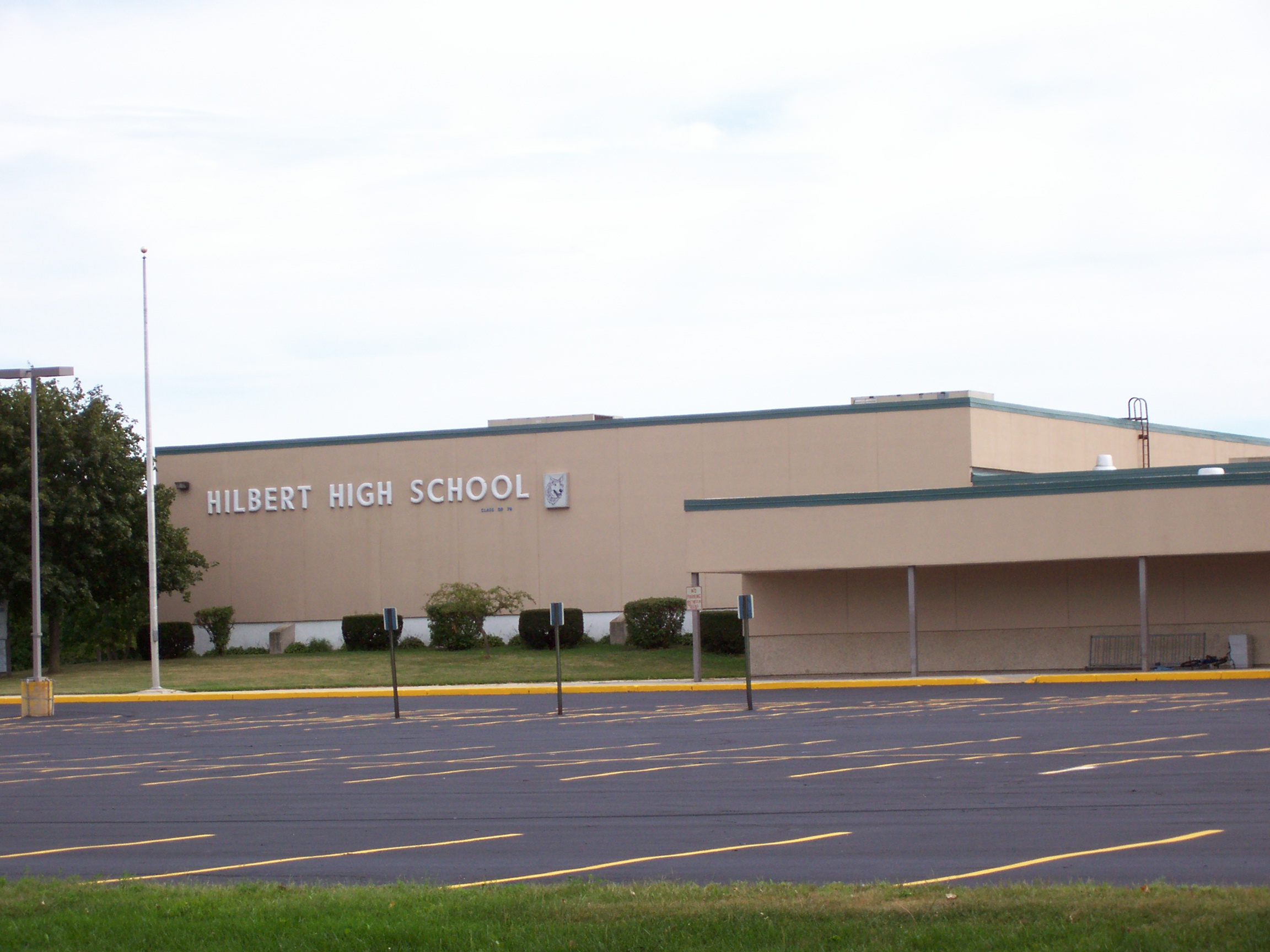
Hilbert High School

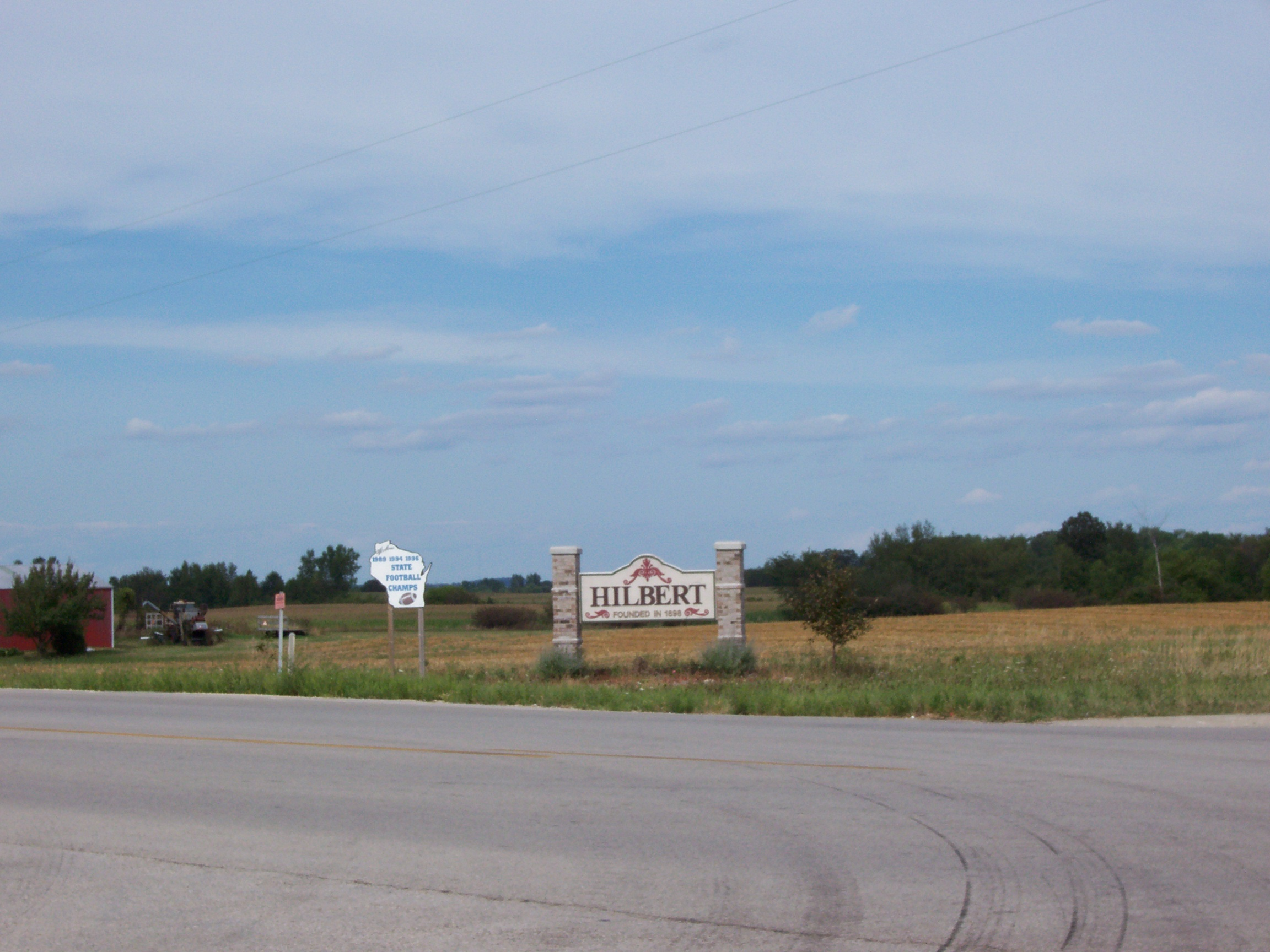
Welcome sign

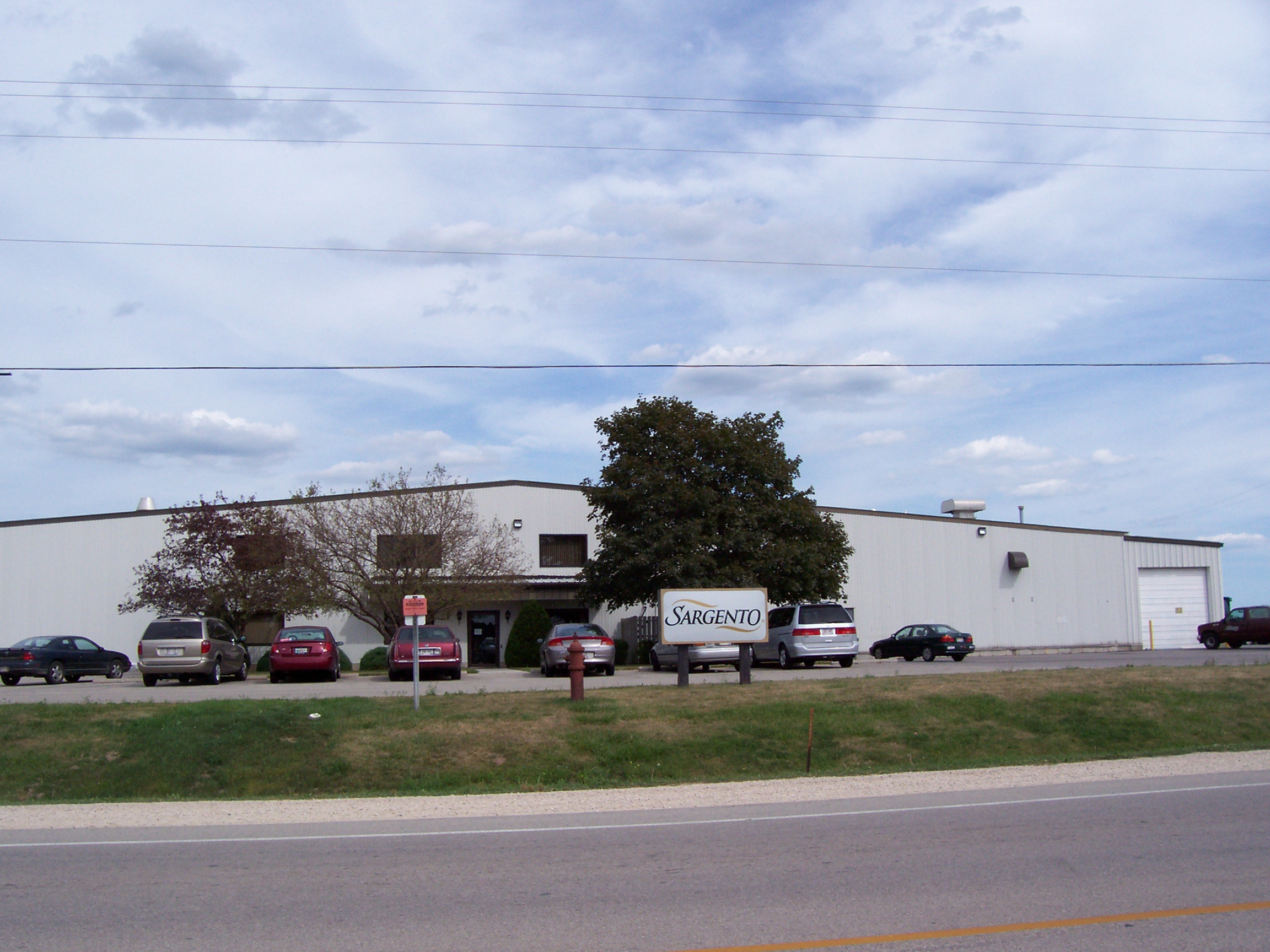
Sargento plant
