= Grafton School District =

School district in Wisconsin

Address
- 1900 Washington Street Grafton, Wisconsin, 53024; United States

District information
- Type: Public
- Grades: PreK–12
- NCES District ID: 5505610

Students and staff
- Students: 2,047 (2021–2022)
- Teachers: 131.16 (on an FTE basis)
- Staff: 85.62 (on an FTE basis)
- Student–teacher ratio: 15.61:1

Other information
- Website: www.grafton.k12.wi.us

Grafton School District is a school district serving the village of Grafton, Ozaukee County, Wisconsin.

== Schools ==
- Grafton High School
- John Long Middle School
- John F. Kennedy Elementary School
- Woodview Elementary School

== See also ==
- List of school districts in Wisconsin
