= Sheboygan Lutheran High School =

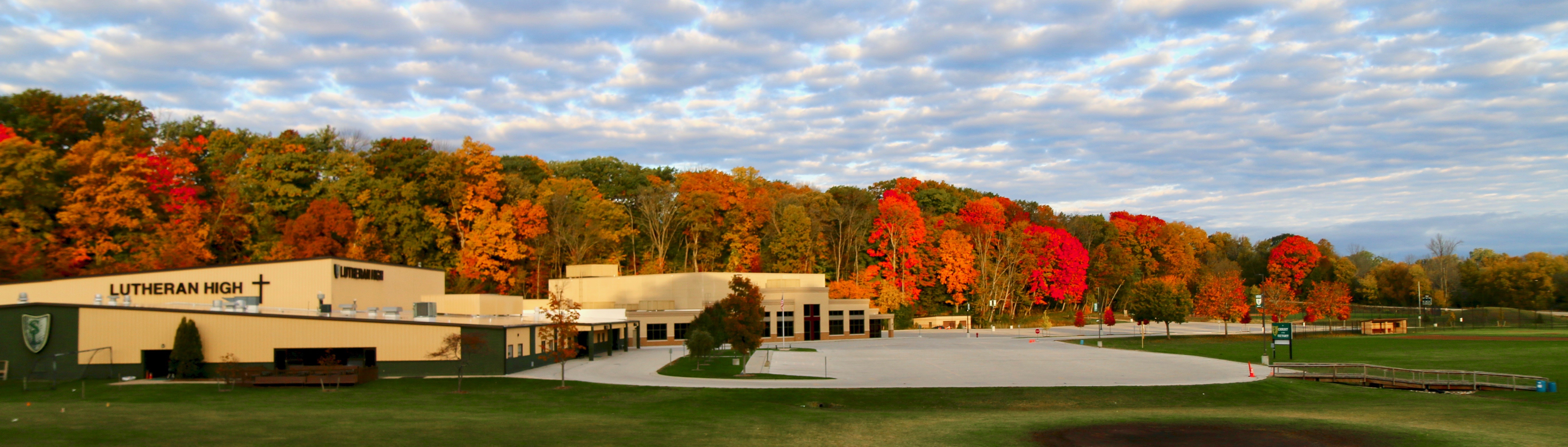
- Sheboygan Lutheran High School campus

Location
- 3323 University Drive; Sheboygan, Wisconsin 53081; United States; 43.73735°N 87.753048°W

Information
- School type: Private Secondary
- Motto: Preparing Christian Leaders - One Student at a Time
- Religious affiliation: Lutheran Church – Missouri Synod
- Established: 1978
- Principal: Derek Bult
- Staff: 29
- Grades: 9–12
- Colors: Green & gold
- Mascot: Crusaders
- Website: www.lutheranhigh.com

Sheboygan Lutheran High School is a private secondary school in Sheboygan, Wisconsin near the University of Wisconsin–Sheboygan campus on the city's southwest side. It is operated by the Lutheran High School Association of the Greater Sheboygan Area, Inc., an association of Lutheran Church – Missouri Synod (LCMS) congregations in the Sheboygan area.

== History ==
The school was opened in 1978. The school dedicated its first building in 1980 and has added numerous additions to the campus. In 2011, it opened Neat Repeats Thrift Shop, a community thrift shop in Plymouth, Wisconsin, to benefit the school.

== Religious background ==
Sheboygan Lutheran High School is affiliated with the Lutheran Church – Missouri Synod, but welcomes students from all faiths, denominations, and backgrounds.

== Curriculum ==
Sheboygan Area Lutheran High School offers a Christian-based, college preparatory curriculum.

== Music and other extra curricular activities ==
Choir: Chamber Choir, Konzertchor
Band: Concert band, Jazz band, pep band
Other extra-curricular activities: fall and spring drama, forensics, national honor society, student council, InterAct, pep club, games club, and more

== Athletics ==
The school's sports teams compete in the WIAA and the school belongs to the Big East Conference.

Fall sports: boys' soccer (combined team with Sheboygan County Christian High School, Division 4 champions 2021, Division 4 runners-up 2022), boys' American football (combined team with Sheboygan County Christian High School and Kohler High School with home games played at Kohler's field), girls' volleyball, boys' cross country (Division 3 champions 2004, 2005, and 2006), girls' cross country (Division 3 runners-up 2008), and girls' swimming

Winter sports: boys' basketball (2011-12 & 2018-19 Division 5 champions), girls' basketball

Spring sports: girls' softball, boys' track, girls' track, boys' golf, girls' soccer and co-ed trap shooting

Summer sports: boys' baseball.

=== Athletic conference affiliation history ===
- Classic Conference (1981-1983)
- Midwest Classic Conference (1983-1999)
- Central Lakeshore Conference (1999-2015)
- Big East Conference (2015–present)

== Notable alumni ==
- Jacob Ognacevic, NCAA Basketball player at Lipscomb University, and 2025 A-Sun Player of the year
- Sam Dekker, former NBA player
- Joe Leibham, former member of the Wisconsin Senate from the 9th district
