= Elkhart Lake-Glenbeulah High School =

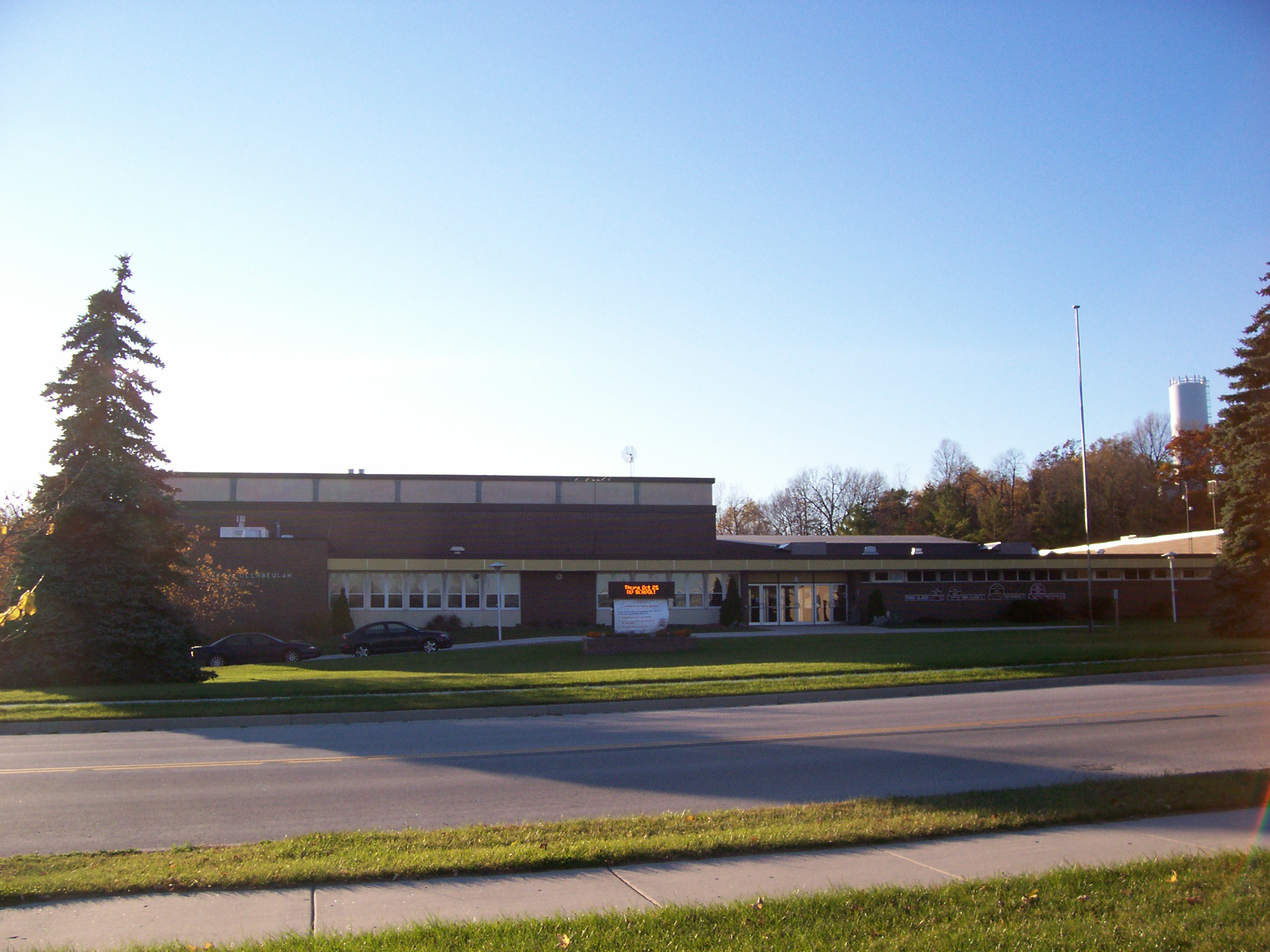
- 201 North Lincoln Street; Elkhart Lake, Wisconsin 53020; United States

Information
- Type: Public
- School district: Elkhart Lake-Glenbeulah School District
- Principal: Ryan Faris
- Teaching staff: 12.22 (on an FTE basis)
- Grades: 9–12
- Enrollment: 160 (2023-2024)
- Student to teacher ratio: 13.09
- Colors: Cardinal and white
- Mascot: Resorters (Elk)
- Website: www.goresorters.com/schools/high-school/

Elkhart Lake-Glenbeulah High School is a public high school located in Elkhart Lake, Wisconsin, United States. It serves grades 9-12 and is part of the Elkhart Lake-Glenbeulah School District. Elkhart Lake-Glenbeulah High School has 158 students.

== Athletics ==
Elkhart Lake-Glenbeulah high school offers the following sports:

- Golf
- Girls' soccer
- Boys' soccer (co-op with New Holstein School District)
- Track & Field
- Baseball
- JV Baseball
- Softball
- Football
- Volleyball
- Cross country
- Swimming (co-op with Kiel School District)
- Boys' basketball
- Girls' basketball
- Wrestling

Elkhart Lake-Glenbeulah High School's athletic teams are known as the Resorters. In fall 2015 the school became a member of the Olympic Conference/Central Lakeshore Conference.

=== Athletic conference affiliation history ===
- Eastern Wisconsin Conference (1923-1924, 1925-1969)
- Central Lakeshore Conference (1969-2015)
- Big East Conference (2015-present)
