= Hilbert High School =

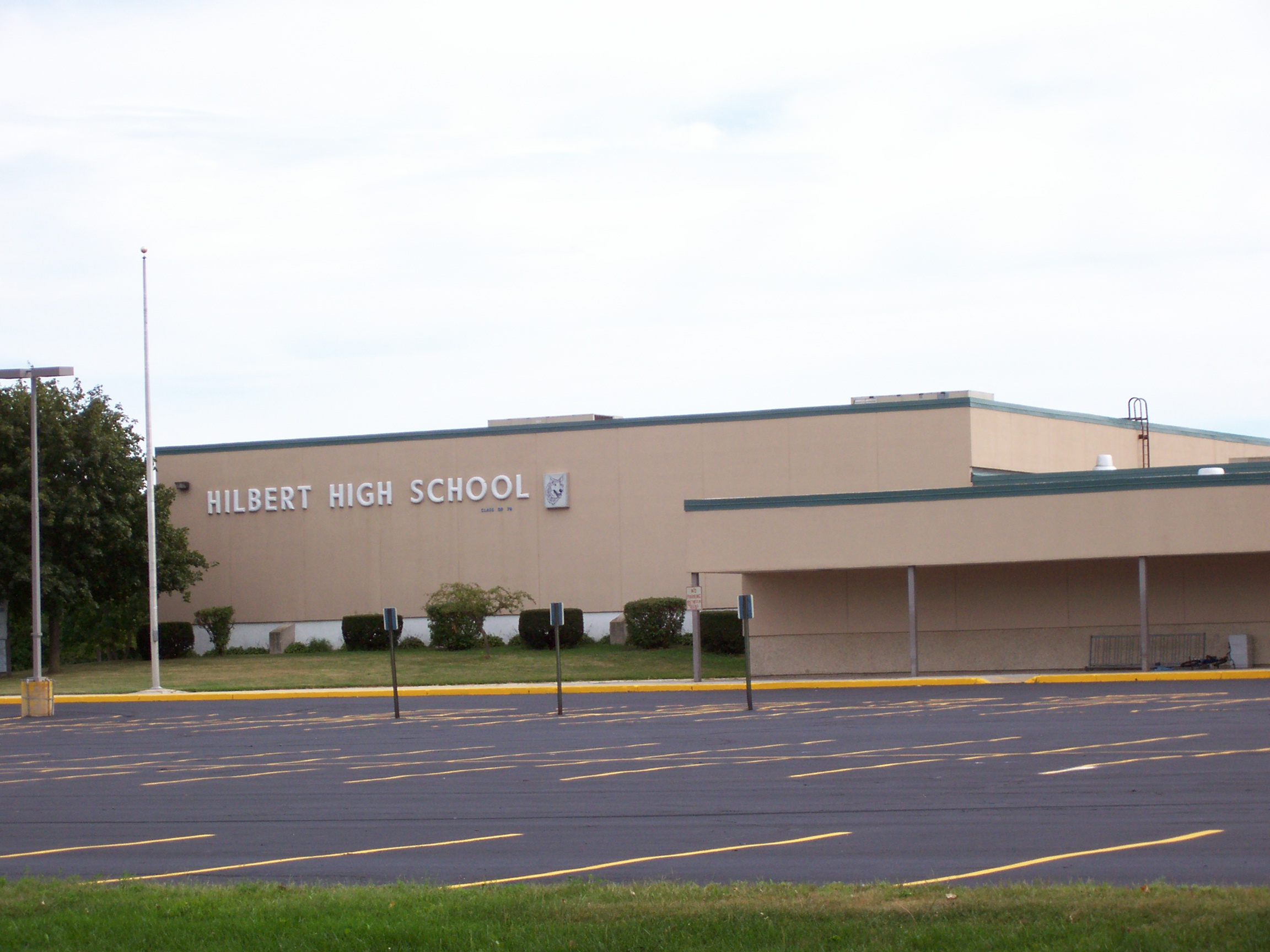

Location
- 1139 W Milwaukee Street; Hilbert, Wisconsin 54129; United States
- Coordinates: 44°08′15.1″N 88°10′06.5″W

Information
- Type: Public high school
- School district: Hilbert School District
- NCES School ID: 550645000701
- Principal: Anthony Sweere
- Teaching staff: 13.75 (on an FTE basis)
- Grades: 9–12
- Enrollment: 143 (2023-2024)
- Student to teacher ratio: 10.40
- Colors: Royal Blue and White
- Mascot: Wolf
- Nickname: Wolves
- Yearbook: Treblih
- Website: www.hilbert.k12.wi.us/hhs/index2.html

Hilbert High School is a public high school in Hilbert, Wisconsin, United States. It is part of the Hilbert School District. The school offers a range of courses, including college prep, advanced placement, core curricular, and vocational courses. It also offers a variety of fine arts, performing arts, athletic programs and clubs.

== Athletics ==
Hilbert's teams are known as the Wolves, and they have been members of the Big East Conference since its inaugural 2015-16 season.

=== Athletic conference affiliation history ===
- Eastern Wisconsin Conference (1923-1924)
- Little Nine Conference (1929-1970)
- Olympian Conference (1970-2015)
- Big East Conference (2015–present)
