= Sheboygan Christian School =

Location
- 929 Greenfield Avenue; Sheboygan, Wisconsin 53081; United States; 43°43′00.0″N 87°42′55.4″W

Information
- Type: Private
- Motto: Scholarship | Discipleship | Citizenship
- Religious affiliation: Christian
- Established: 1898
- Principal: Ann Steenwyk
- Staff: 70
- Grades: 3K - 12
- Enrollment: 600 (26-27)
- Colors: Navy & Gold
- Mascot: Eagles
- Website: sheboyganchristian.com

Sheboygan Christian School is a state and nationally accredited, independent, 3K-12th grade Christian School. Each day SCS serves more than 600 students from over 300 families residing in Sheboygan, Manitowoc and Calumet counties. SCS families represent over 60 different churches.

== History ==
Established in 1971, Sheboygan County Christian High School was founded by parents who wished for secondary education taught with a Biblical worldview. Its original location was inside a church on the outskirts of Sheboygan. The school has been overseen by an association of Christian parents committed to training their children in keeping with the teachings of the Holy Bible and governed by an elected board of trustees. It has grown to its present location at 929 Greenfield Avenue, on the south side of Sheboygan.

In December 2015, the associations of Sheboygan County Christian High School and Sheboygan Christian School (a pre-kindergarten through 8th grade school on the city's north side) voted to merge. With the merger, the two schools merged both their associations and boards of trustees. Another addition was built onto the high school campus, and the K-8 school moved into the new wing, beginning with the 2021–22 school year.

== Curriculum ==
The school day consists of eight periods of 45 minutes each, during which all students are required to take six courses. Courses in the arts, business education and applied arts are combined with more traditional offerings. The school year of 180 days consists of two semesters, each divided into two nine-week marking periods. A final exam is administered at the end of each semester.

The school offers advanced placement biology. Some courses are offered through Lakeland College, along with blended learning courses and independent studies opportunities.

== Visual learning ==
Through artistic talents of staff and students, Christian High has large murals in almost every classroom, relating to the subject taught in each classroom. For example, the English room has Shakespearian figures painted on the back wall and the history room has World War I paratroopers landing in the corner.

== Athletics ==
The school's sports teams, the Eagles, compete in the WIAA and the school is a member of the Big East Conference. Outside of its co-op pairings, the school's rival is Sheboygan Lutheran High School.

=== Fall ===
- Boys’ soccer (JV and varsity)
- Girls’ volleyball (JV and varsity)
- Boys’ football (JV and varsity) - co-op with Sheboygan Lutheran High School and Kohler High School
- Girls’ swimming (JV and varsity) - co-op with Sheboygan Lutheran, Kohler and Sheboygan Falls High School
- Cross country (varsity)

=== Winter ===
- Boys’ basketball (JV and varsity)
- Girls’ basketball (JV and varsity)
- Boys' Hockey - co-op with Sheboygan high schools

=== Spring ===
- Baseball - co-op with Kohler
- Girls’ soccer (varsity)
- Golf

=== Athletic conference affiliation history ===
- Classic Conference (1973-1983)
- Midwest Classic Conference (1983-1999)
- Central Lakeshore Conference (1999-2015)
- Big East Conference (2015–present)
