= Random Lake, Wisconsin =

- Village
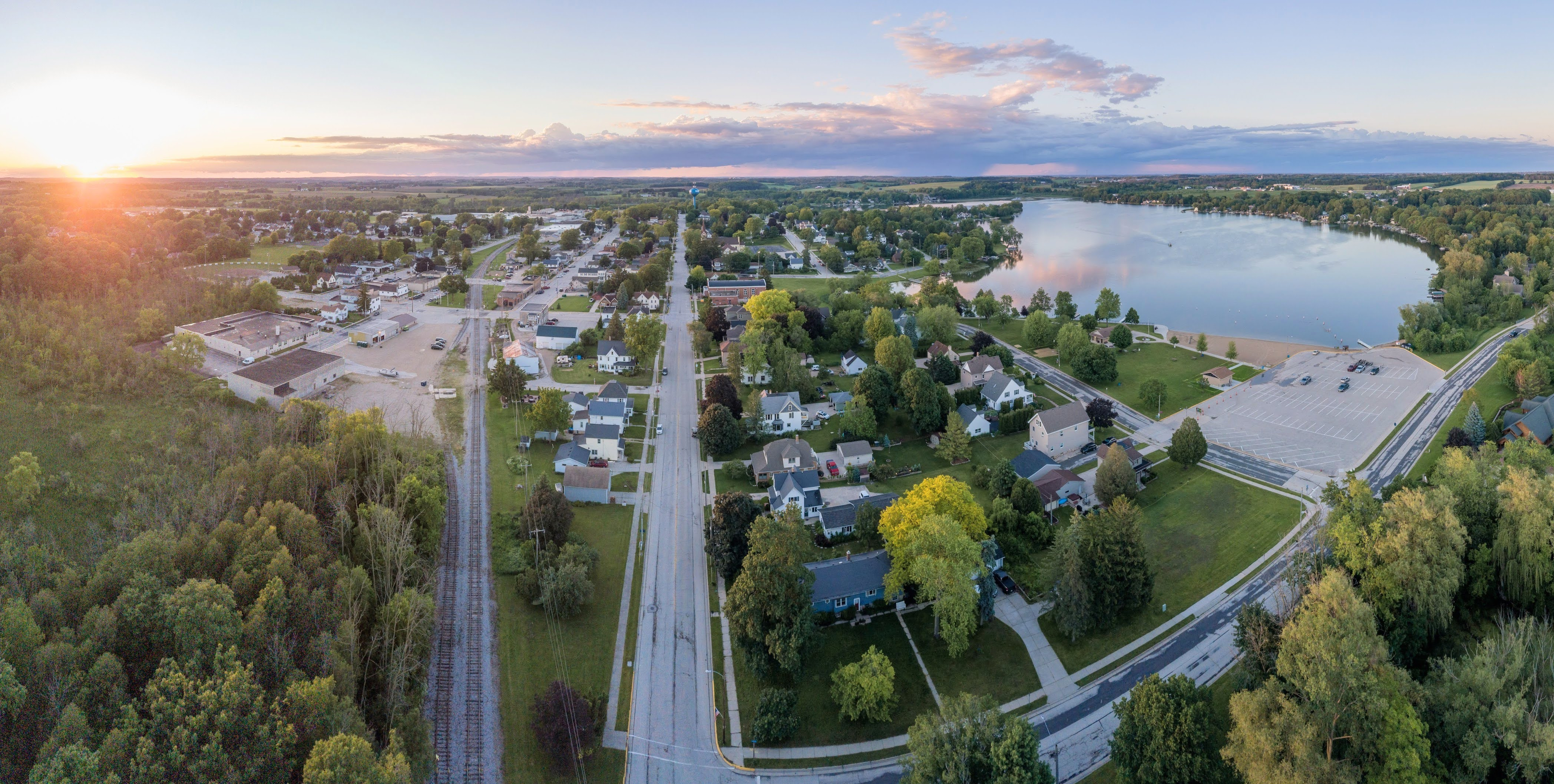
- Random Lake, facing North

- Location of Random Lake in Sheboygan County, Wisconsin.
- Coordinates: 43°33′9″N 87°57′37″W
- Country: United States
- State: Wisconsin
- County: Sheboygan

Area
  - Total: 1.76 sq mi (4.57 km^{2})
  - Land: 1.42 sq mi (3.69 km^{2})
  - Water: 0.34 sq mi (0.88 km^{2})
- Elevation: 889 ft (271 m)

Population (2020)
  - Total: 1,594
  - Estimate (2022): 1,569
  - Density: 1,120/sq mi (432/km^{2})
- Time zone: UTC-6 (Central (CST))
  - Summer (DST): UTC-5 (CDT)
- Area code: 920
- FIPS code: 55-66200
- GNIS feature ID: 1572069
- Website: randomlakewi.com

Random Lake is a village in Sheboygan County, Wisconsin, United States. The population was 1,561 at the 2020 census. It is part of the Sheboygan, Wisconsin Metropolitan Statistical Area.

== Geography ==
Random Lake is located at 43°33′9″N 87°57′37″W (43.552, -87.960).

According to the United States Census Bureau, the village has a total area of 1.69 square miles (4.38 km^{2}), of which 1.35 square miles (3.50 km^{2}) is land and 0.34 square miles (0.88 km^{2}) is water.

== Demographics ==
Historical population
Census	Pop.	Note	%±
1880	158		—
1910	408		—
1920	479		17.4%
1930	576		20.3%
1940	613		6.4%
1950	679		10.8%
1960	858		26.4%
1970	1,068		24.5%
1980	1,287		20.5%
1990	1,439		11.8%
2000	1,551		7.8%
2010	1,594		2.8%
2020	1,561		−2.1%
2022 (est.)	1,569	▲	0.5%
U.S. Decennial Census

=== 2010 census ===
As of the census of 2010, there were 1,594 people, 659 households, and 441 families living in the village. The population density was 1,180.7 inhabitants per square mile (455.9/km^{2}). There were 720 housing units at an average density of 533.3 per square mile (205.9/km^{2}). The racial makeup of the village was 95.4% White, 0.4% African American, 0.3% Native American, 0.6% Asian, 2.2% from other races, and 1.1% from two or more races. Hispanic or Latino of any race were 4.5% of the population.

There were 659 households, of which 31.7% had children under the age of 18 living with them, 54.2% were married couples living together, 8.5% had a female householder with no husband present, 4.2% had a male householder with no wife present, and 33.1% were non-families. 26.4% of all households were made up of individuals, and 10% had someone living alone who was 65 years of age or older. The average household size was 2.42 and the average family size was 2.94.

The median age in the village was 40.3 years. 24% of residents were under the age of 18; 6.7% were between the ages of 18 and 24; 27.4% were from 25 to 44; 29% were from 45 to 64; and 13% were 65 years of age or older. The gender makeup of the village was 50.8% male and 49.2% female.

=== 2000 census ===
As of the census of 2000, there were 1,551 people, 613 households, and 424 families living in the village. The population density was 1,217.9 people per square mile (471.5/km^{2}). There were 656 housing units at an average density of 515.1 per square mile (199.4/km^{2}). The racial makeup of the village was 97.42% White, 0.58% Native American, 0.13% Asian, 0.26% Pacific Islander, 0.77% from other races, and 0.84% from two or more races. Hispanic or Latino of any race were 1.61% of the population.

There were 613 households, out of which 34.1% had children under the age of 18 living with them, 55.8% were married couples living together, 9.0% had a female householder with no husband present, and 30.8% were non-families. 25.6% of all households were made up of individuals, and 11.4% had someone living alone who was 65 years of age or older. The average household size was 2.53 and the average family size was 3.02.

In the village, the population was spread out, with 27.0% under the age of 18, 7.9% from 18 to 24, 31.9% from 25 to 44, 20.4% from 45 to 64, and 12.8% who were 65 years of age or older. The median age was 37 years. For every 100 females, there were 100.1 males. For every 100 females age 18 and over, there were 101.6 males.

The median income for a household in the village was $45,938, and the median income for a family was $51,979. Males had a median income of $37,813 versus $23,510 for females. The per capita income for the village was $21,892. About 3.7% of families and 5.4% of the population were below the poverty line, including 8.4% of those under age 18 and 5.4% of those age 65 or over.

== Education ==
Random Lake is home to Random Lake High School, a public school that serves approximately 400 students from the village and the surrounding area. The school was established in 1929 and its current structure constructed in 1959. The mascot for Random Lake High School is the Ram and the school colors are royal blue and silver.

Random Lake had one parochial school, Our Lady of the Lakes, a Roman Catholic school that enrolled about 60 students. Our Lady of the Lakes was forced to close after dropping enrollment rates.

== Images ==
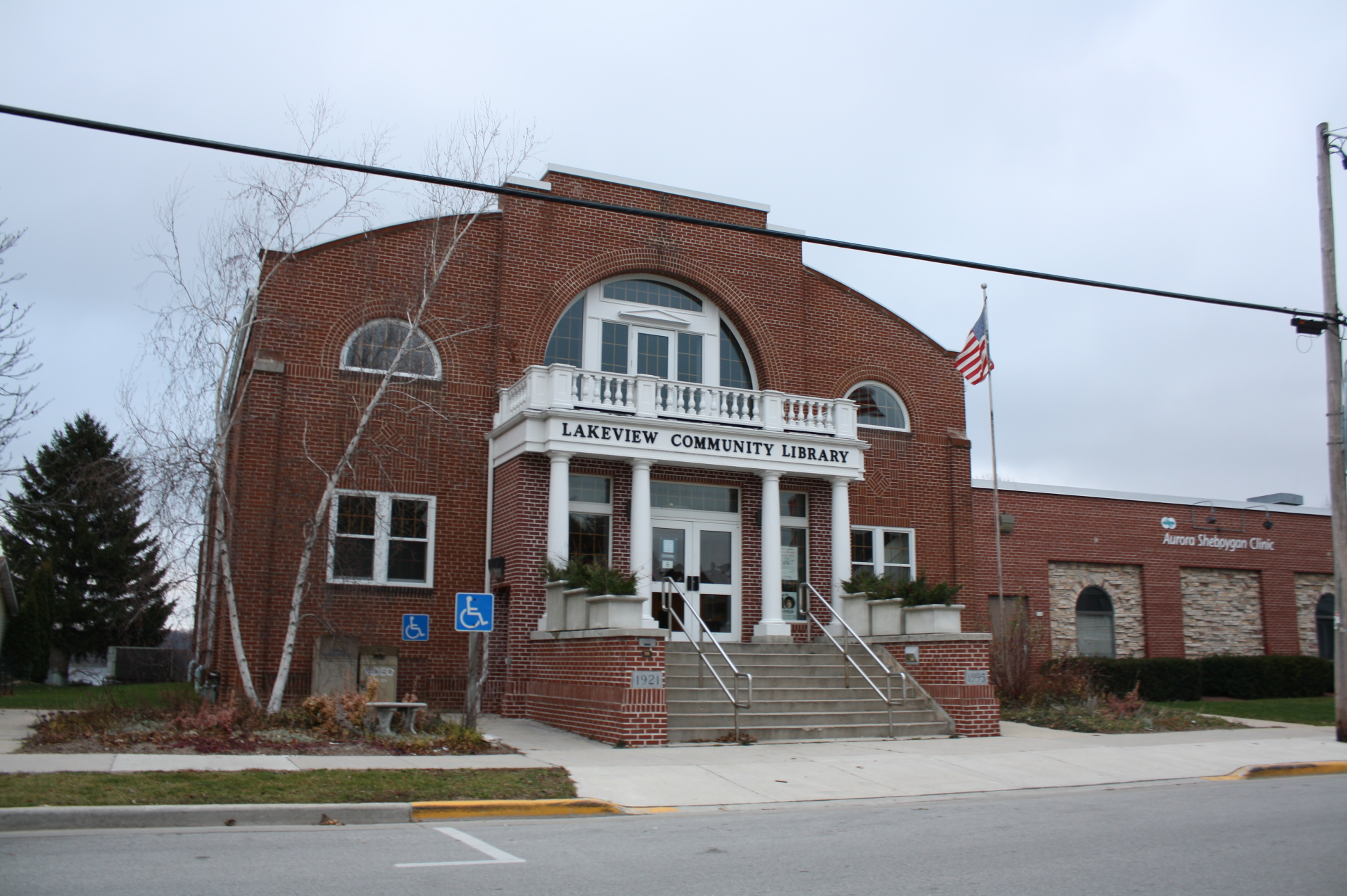
Village hall and library

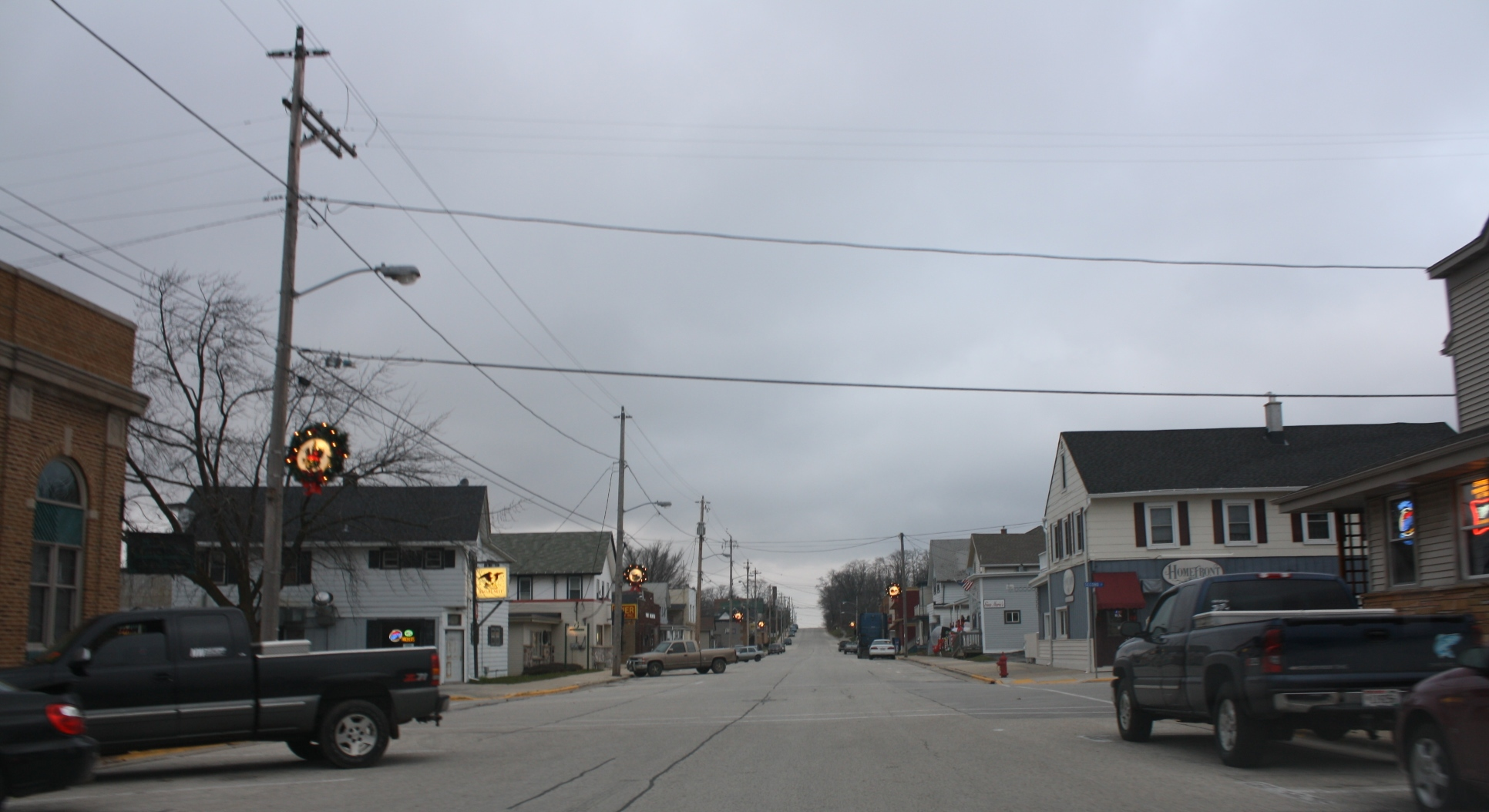
Downtown Random Lake

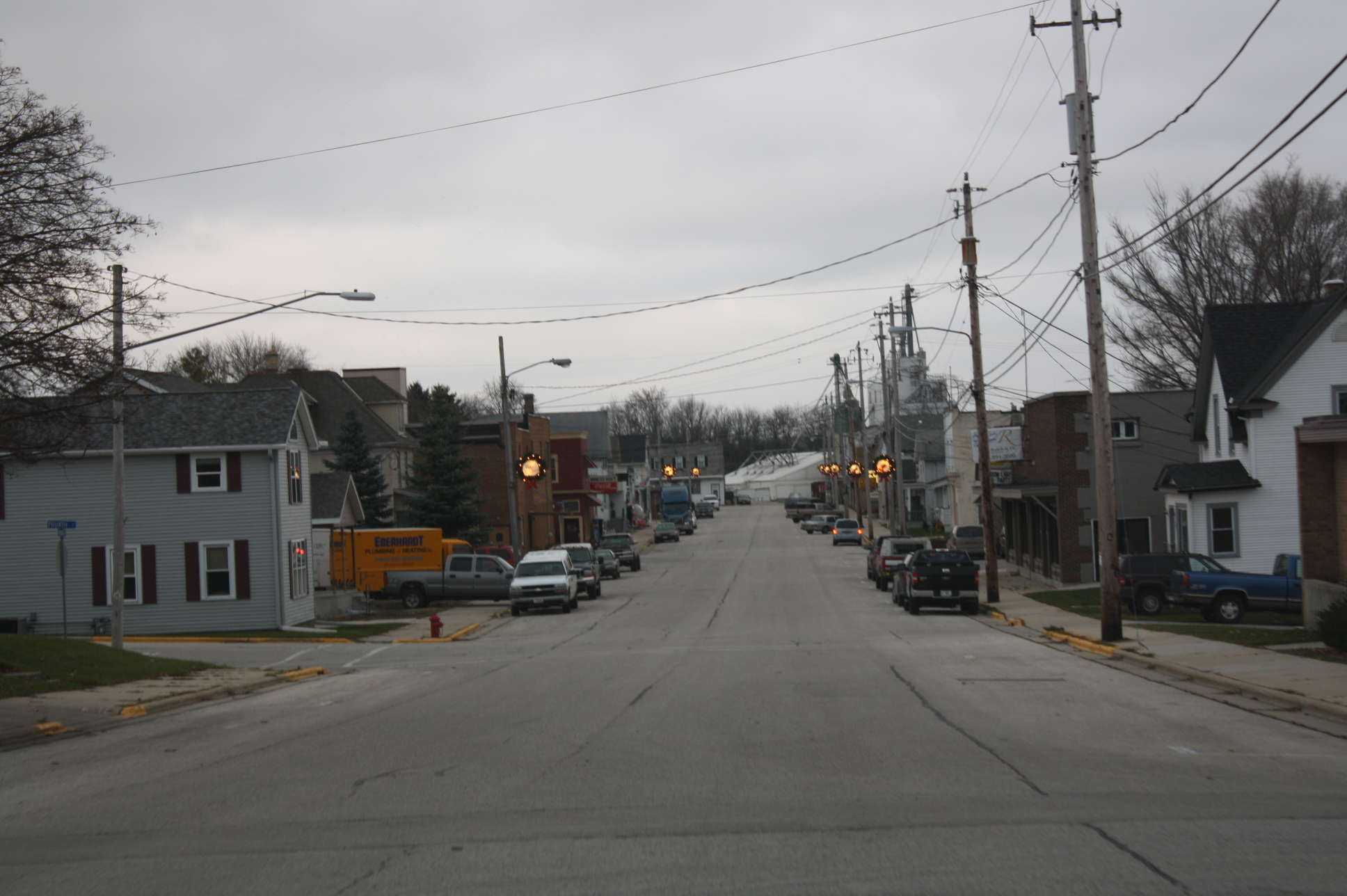
Looking south at downtown Random Lake

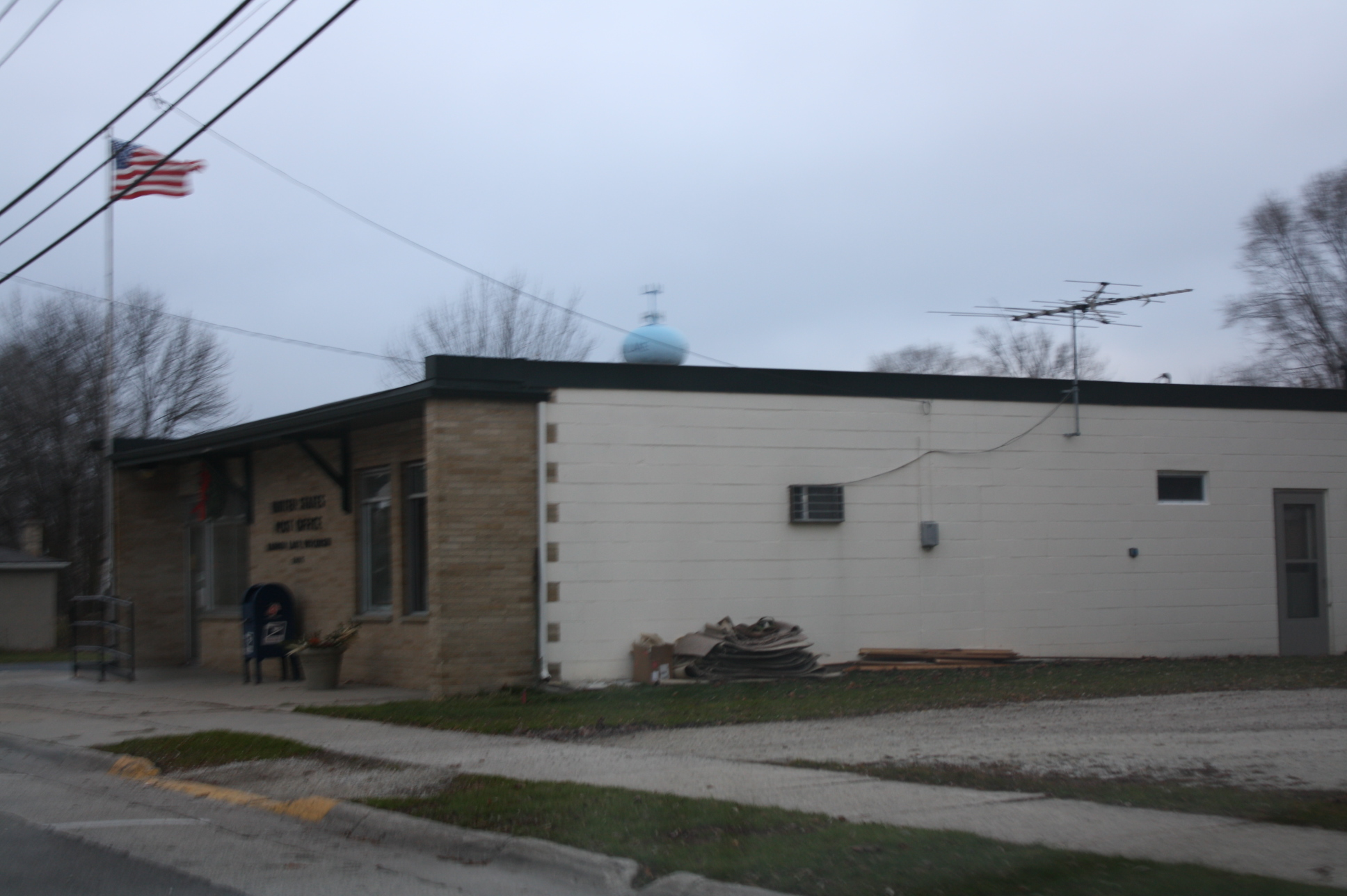
Post office

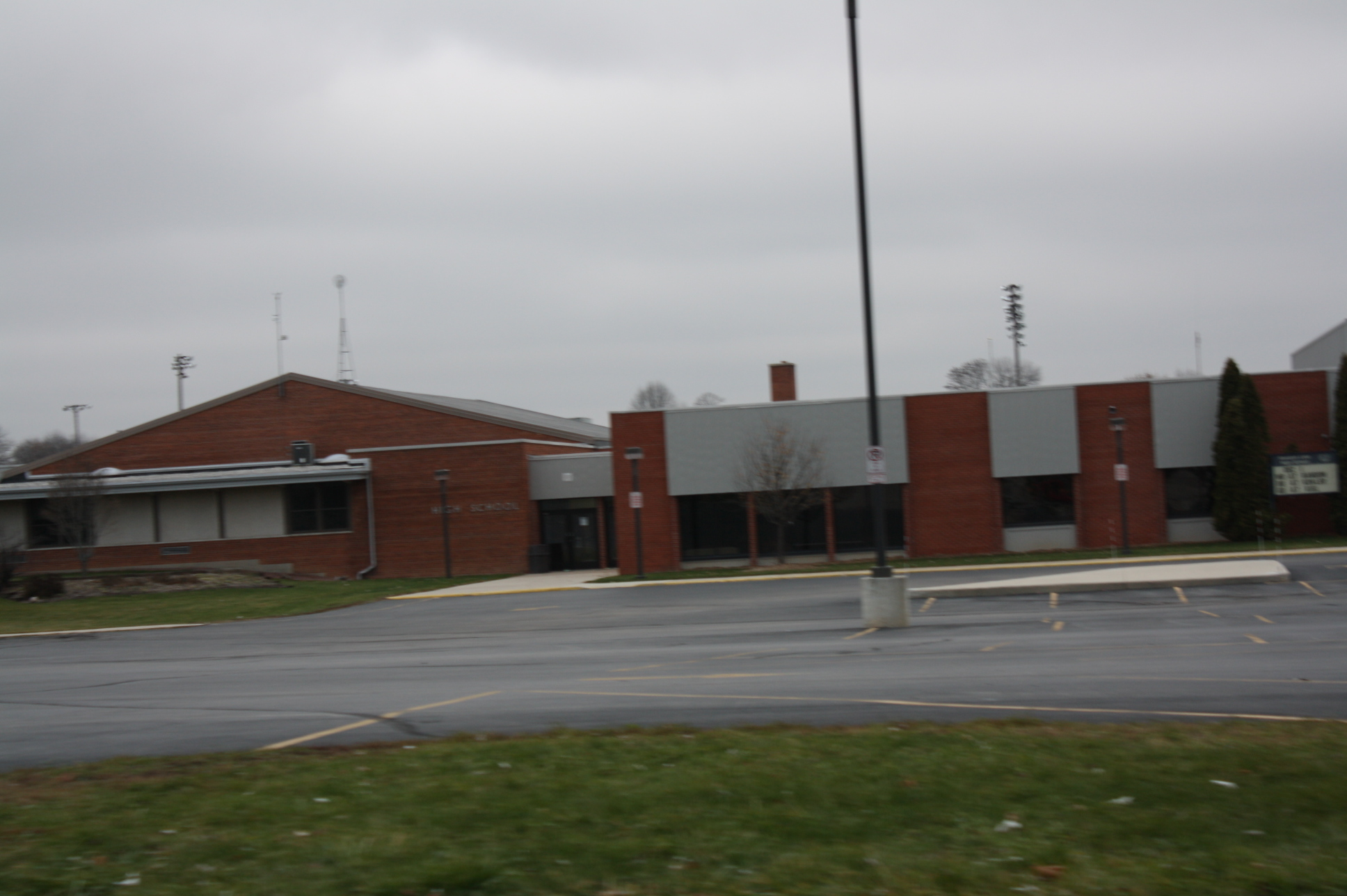
Random Lake High School

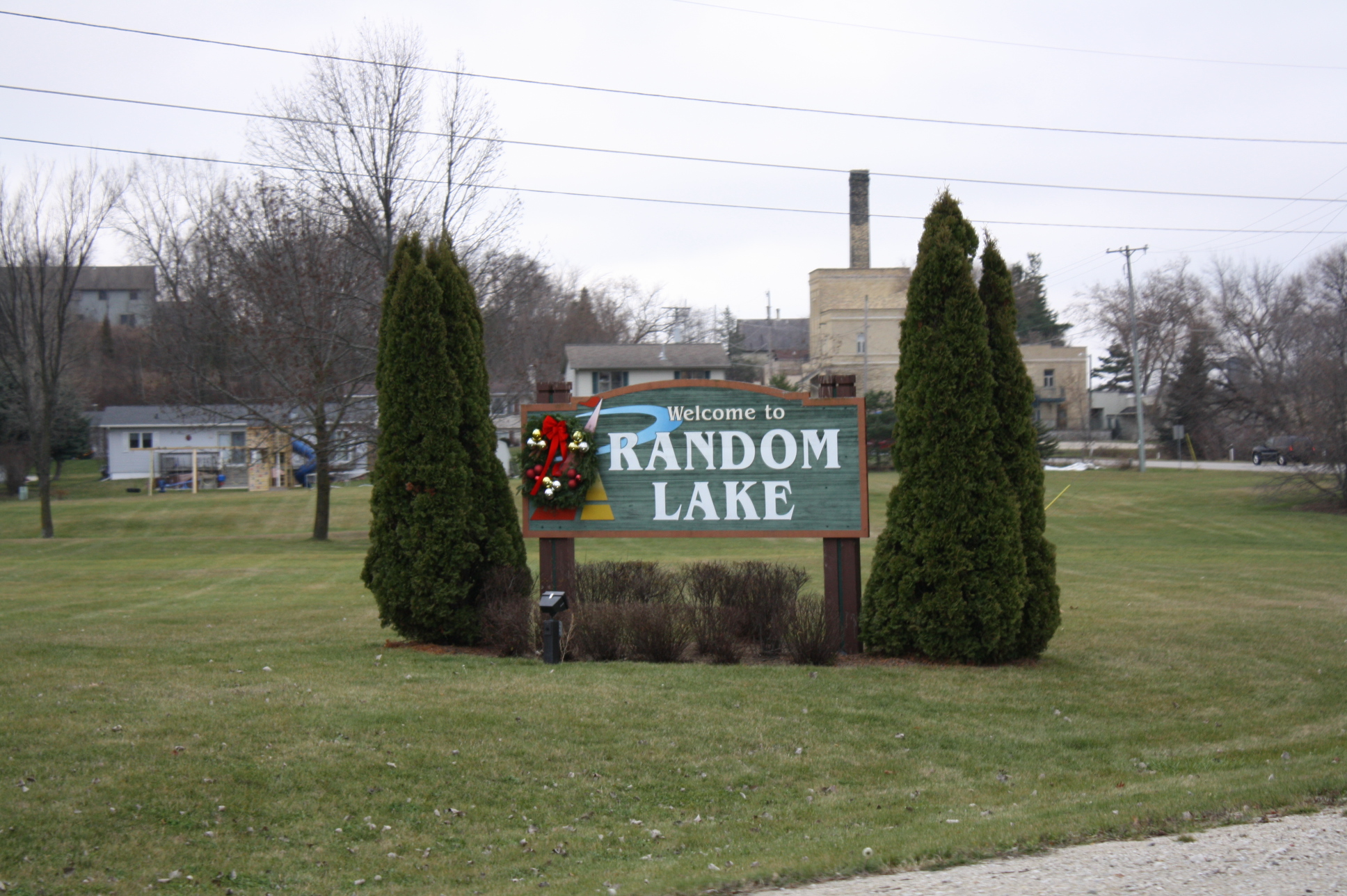
City welcome sign

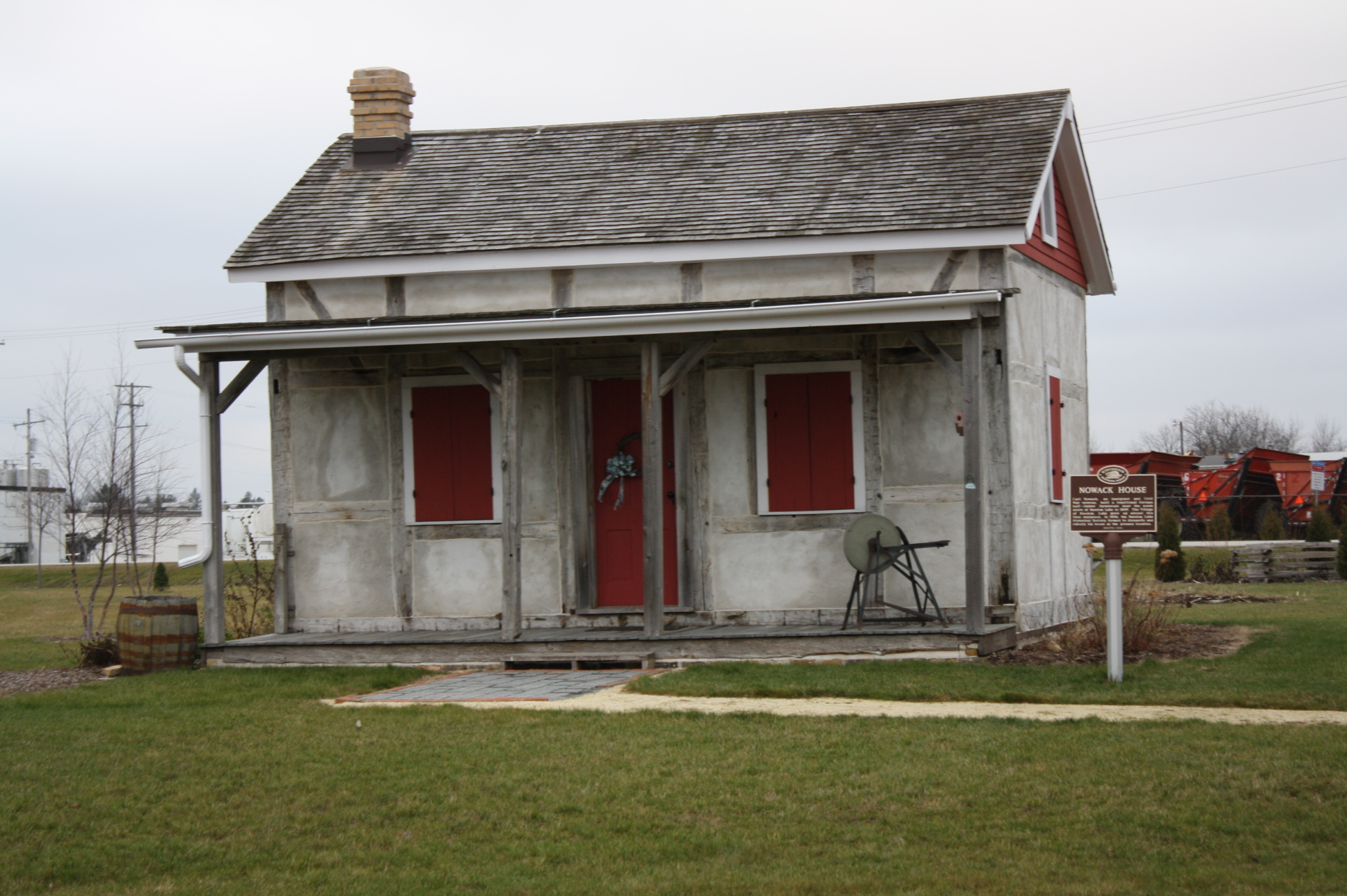
Nowack House

== See also ==
- List of villages in Wisconsin
