= Belgium (town), Wisconsin =

Town in Ozaukee County, Wisconsin

Town of Belgium, Wisconsin
- Town
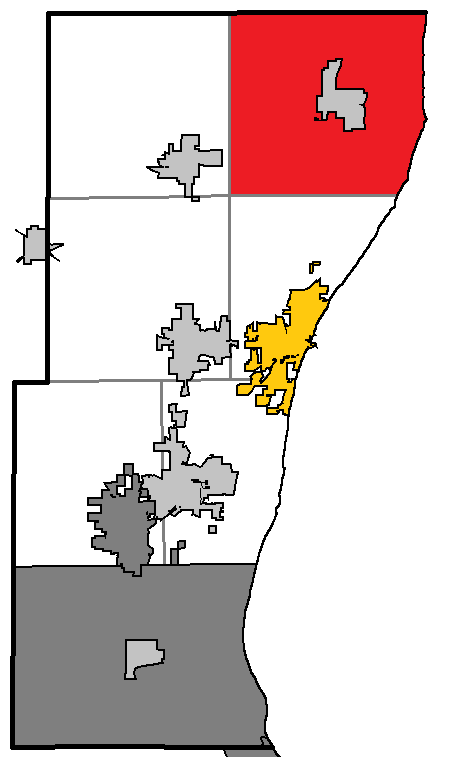
- Location of the Town of Belgium, within Ozaukee County, Wisconsin.
- Coordinates: 43°29′59″N 87°53′19″W
- Country: United States
- State: Wisconsin
- County: Ozaukee
- Incorporated: 1848; 178 years ago

Government
  - Town Chairman: Thomas Winker
  - Clerk: Ginger Murphy
  - Treasurer: Dayle Parks
  - Board of supervisors: Supervisors: William Janeshek; Thomas Bichler

Area
  - Total: 36.8 sq mi (95.3 km^{2})
  - Land: 35.8 sq mi (92.6 km^{2})
  - Water: 1.0 sq mi (2.7 km^{2})
- Elevation: 774 ft (236 m)

Population (2020)
  - Total: 1,450
  - Density: 40.6/sq mi (15.7/km^{2})
- Time zone: UTC-6 (Central (CST))
  - Summer (DST): UTC-5 (CDT)
- Area code: 262
- Website: www.townofbelgiumwi.gov

Belgium is a town in Ozaukee County, Wisconsin, United States. The population was 1,450 at the 2020 census. The Village of Belgium is surrounded on all sides by the town, and the unincorporated communities of Decker, Holy Cross, Lake Church, and Sauk Trail Beach are located in the town, as is the ghost town of Stonehaven. The unincorporated community of Dacada is also partially located in the town.

Beginning in the 1840s, immigrant farmers from Luxembourg settled in the towns of Northern Ozaukee County, including Belgium. Their centers of settlement in the Town of Belgium included the hamlets of Dacada, Holy Cross, and Lake Church, as well as the settlement that would eventually become the Village of Belgium, which incorporated from some of the town's land in 1922. The Town of Belgium is a primarily agricultural community with over 18,000 acres of farmland—the largest amount in any Ozaukee County community.

== History ==
Northeastern Ozaukee County, including the town and village Belgium, was inhabited by several Native American tribes, including the Menominee. The Menominee surrendered the land that would become Belgium to the United States Federal Government through the 1832 Treaty of Washington.

In the late 1840s, immigrants from Luxembourg began to settle in what would become northeastern Ozaukee County. In 1848, the Town of Belgium was created out of the Town of Port Washington.

The Chicago, Milwaukee & St. Paul Railway began running through the community in 1872, spurring population growth. In the early 20th Century, Belgium was a stop on the Milwaukee Interurban Line, which ran between Milwaukee and Sheboygan from 1908 until 1948. The population began to concentrate around the railroad station, and the Village of Belgium was incorporated out of some of the town's land in 1922.

From 1901 to 1925, the Lake Shore Stone Company operated a dolomite quarry at the present location of Harrington Beach State Park in the Town of Belgium. There was a company town called Stonehaven at the site. Most of the workers were immigrants from Luxembourg, the Austro-Hungarian Empire, and Italy. When the quarry closed, some of the residential buildings were moved to the Village of Belgium. The foundations of some of the building remain in the state park.

== Geography ==
According to the United States Census Bureau, the town has a total area of 36.8 square miles (95.3 km^{2}), of which 35.7 square miles (92.6 km^{2}) is land and 1.1 square miles (2.7 km^{2}) of it (2.88%) is water. The Village of Belgium is located in what was formerly the central part of the Town of Belgium. The town borders the Town of Holland to the north, Lake Michigan to the east, the Town of Port Washington to the south, and the Town of Fredonia to the west. The unincorporated communities of Dacada, Decker, Holy Cross, Lake Church, and Sauk Trail Beach are located in the town as is the former company town of Stonehaven.

The town is located in the Southeastern Wisconsin glacial till plains that were created by the Wisconsin glaciation during the most recent ice age. The Wisconsin Department of Natural Resources considers the town to be in the Central Lake Michigan Coastal ecological landscape. The Lake Michigan coastline in the town is lined with sand and gravel beaches.

Before white settlers arrived in the area, much of the Belgium area was an upland forest dominated by American beech and sugar maple trees. There were also lowland conifer forests and swamps dominated by white cedar and tamarack along the Onion River, Sauk Creek, and Sucker Creek, all of which flow through the town. Much of the original forest was cleared to prepare the land for agriculture. Much of the town remains agricultural; as of 2000 there were over 18,000 acres of agricultural land in the town—the largest amount of farmland in any Ozaukee County community. However, as of 2002, the Town of Belgium also had the largest share of restored wetlands in the county with over 126 acres spread across 105 restoration sites.

Large mammals, including white-tailed deer, coyotes, and red foxes, can be seen in the town. The community is also home to several bird habitats, including the United States Fish and Wildlife Service's Belgium Waterfowl Production Area and the Cedar Grove Waterfowl Production Area as well as Harrington Beach State Park which is located on the shore of Lake Michigan and is one of two Wisconsin Important Bird Areas in Ozaukee County. The open fields in the western part of Harrington Beach are a breeding ground for upland sandpipers.

The region struggles with many invasive species, including the emerald ash borer, common carp, reed canary grass, the common reed, purple loosestrife, garlic mustard, Eurasian buckthorns, and honeysuckles. Some of the wetlands in the Town of Belgium are especially affected by reed canary grass, with the invasive species accounting for more than 50% of plant coverage along some stretches of Sucker Creek and the Onion River.

== Demographics ==
As of the census of 2009, there were 2,008 people, 547 households, and 421 families residing in the town. The population density was 42.3 people per square mile (16.3/km^{2}). There were 631 housing units at an average density of 17.7 per square mile (6.8/km^{2}). The racial makeup of the town was 98.02% White, 0.07% Native American, 0.53% Asian, 0.40% from other races, and 0.99% from two or more races. 1.06% of the population were Hispanic or Latino of any race.

There were 547 households, out of which 33.1% had children under the age of 18 living with them, 66.7% were married couples living together, 6.0% had a female householder with no husband present, and 22.9% were non-families. 18.3% of all households were made up of individuals, and 6.4% had someone living alone who was 65 years of age or older. The average household size was 2.77 and the average family size was 3.19.

In the town, the population was spread out, with 27.0% under the age of 18, 6.4% from 18 to 24, 28.5% from 25 to 44, 25.0% from 45 to 64, and 13.2% who were 65 years of age or older. The median age was 39 years. For every 100 females, there were 109.0 males. For every 100 females age 18 and over, there were 110.1 males.

The median income for a household in the town was $57,865, and the median income for a family was $62,500. Males had a median income of $42,083 versus $26,875 for females. The per capita income for the town was $24,746. About 1.6% of families and 2.2% of the population were below the poverty line, including 0.5% of those under age 18 and 2.3% of those age 65 or over.

== Culture ==
Northern Ozaukee County—including the Belgium community—was a center of Luxembourgian-American settlement in the United States in the 19th century, and the town and village of Belgium continue to have strong cultural ties to the Grand Duchy of Luxembourg. Since 1977, the village has been home to the Luxembourg American Cultural Society & Center, which is sponsored by the Luxembourg Government Ministry of Culture and Ministry of Economy. The society facilitates a program to help Americans of Luxembourgish ancestry get dual citizenship, organizes guided tours of the Grand Duchy, and maintains a museum devoted to the history of Luxembourg and Luxembourgish immigration to the United States. Since 1987, the society has also organized an annual Luxembourg Fest featuring tradition cuisine such as träipen.

Many of the Luxembourgers who settled in northern Ozaukee County were Catholic and established Catholic parishes in rural parts of the county. The hamlets of Dacada, Holy Cross, and Lake Church formed around the Catholic parishes of St. Nicholas, Holy Cross, and St. Mary, respectively. The Divine Savior Catholic Congregation, based out of Fredonia, administers the Catholic churches and chapels in the Town of Belgium as well as the St. Rose of Lima Chapel in Fredonia, St. Mary Mother of Sorrows Church in the hamlet of Little Kohler, and Our Lady of the Lakes in Random Lake. The parish also operates a parochial school for kindergarten through sixth grades in Fredonia.

== Law and government ==
Belgium is organized as a town governed by an elected board, comprising a chairman and two supervisors. The current chairman is Thomas Winker. The town hall is located on Main Street in the Village of Belgium.

As part of Wisconsin's 6th congressional district, Belgium is represented by Glenn Grothman (R) in the United States House of Representatives, and by Ron Johnson (R) and Tammy Baldwin (D) in the United States Senate. Duey Stroebel (R) represents Belgium in the Wisconsin State Senate, and Robert Brooks (R) represents Belgium in the Wisconsin State Assembly.

== Education ==
The Town of Belgium is served by three school districts: the Cedar Grove-Belgium School District, the Northern Ozaukee School District, and the Random Lake School District. Students in the Cedar Grove-Belgium School District attend Cedar Grove-Belgium Elementary School for kindergarten through fourth grade, Cedar Grove-Belgium Middle School for fifth through eighth grades, and Cedar Grove-Belgium High School for ninth through twelfth grades. All of the district's schools are located in Cedar Grove, Sheboygan County, north of the Town of Belgium. Students in the Northern Ozaukee School District, which also serves the villages of Fredonia and Newburg as well as parts of the towns of Fredonia and Saukville, attend Ozaukee Elementary School for kindergarten through fifth grade, Ozaukee Middle School for sixth through eighth grades, and Ozaukee High School for grades nine through twelve. Students in the Random Lake School District attend Random Lake Elementary School for kindergarten through fourth grade, Random Lake Middle School for fifth through eighth grades, and Random Lake High School for ninth through twelfth grades.

== Transportation ==
Interstate 43 runs north–south through the eastern part of the town with access via Exit 107.

Ozaukee County Transit Services' Shared Ride Taxi provides a public transit option for Belgium residents. The taxis operate seven days a week and make connections to Washington County Transit and Milwaukee County Routes 12, 49 and 42u. Unlike a typical taxi, however, the rider must contact the service ahead of time to schedule their pick-up date and time, more closely resembling an Uber or Lyft ride. The taxi service plans their routes based on the number of riders, pick-up/drop-off time and destination then plans the routes accordingly.

The Ozaukee Interurban Trail, which is for pedestrian and bicycle use, passes through Belgium and connects the town to the neighboring communities of Port Washington and Cedar Grove, and continues north to Oostburg and south to Milwaukee County.

The Union Pacific Railroad operates a freight rail line running parallel to the Ozaukee Interurban Trail, but Belgium currently does not have a passenger train station.

== Parks and recreation ==
Harrington Beach State Park, the only Wisconsin State Park in Ozaukee County, is located on Lake Michigan's shore in the Town of Belgium. The 715-acre park includes a white cedar and hardwood swamp, grasslands with restored wetland ponds and a flooded limestone quarry which is now a 26-acre lake stocked with fish. The park also contains hiking trails, a nature center, picnic facilities, a beach, and a 69-unit campground with bathing facilities.

The Ozaukee Washington Land Trust maintains the Forest Beach Migratory Preserve, a 116-acre nature preserve along Lake Michigan in the southern part of the town. The former site of a golf course, the preserve contains hardwood forests, grasslands, and restored wetlands as well as a nature center, and is a habitat for birds that migrate along the Great Lakes shores.

The Ozaukee Interurban Trail runs through the town, following the former route of the Milwaukee Interurban Rail Line. The southern end of the trail is at Bradley Road in Brown Deer which connects to the Oak Leaf Trail (43°09′48″N 87°57′39″W), and its northern end is at DeMaster Road in the Village of Oostburg, Sheboygan County (43°36′57″N 87°48′08″W). The trail connects the community to neighboring Port Washington and Cedar Grove.

== Notable people ==
- Fred L. Feierstein, Wisconsin state legislator, lived in the town
- John J. Jungers, Wisconsin state legislator, was born in the town
- Louis L. Pierron, Wisconsin state legislator, was born in the town
