= Louis Wolf =

19th century American politician (1825–1887)

Member of the Wisconsin Senate from the 20th district
- In office January 7, 1878 – January 5, 1880
- Preceded by: Daniel Cavanagh
- Succeeded by: Patrick Henry Smith

Member of the Wisconsin State Assembly from the Sheboygan 3rd district
- In office January 3, 1876 – January 1, 1877
- Preceded by: Nathaniel Farnsworth
- Succeeded by: Ambrose Delos DeLand
- In office January 5, 1874 – January 4, 1875
- Preceded by: Peter Daane
- Succeeded by: Nathaniel Farnsworth

Member of the Wisconsin State Assembly from the Sheboygan 2nd district
- In office January 4, 1864 – January 2, 1865
- Preceded by: Charles Œtling
- Succeeded by: Cephas Whipple

Personal details
- Born: Friedrich Ludwig Wolff; September 14, 1825 Dürkheim, Rheinkreis, Kingdom of Bavaria
- Died: December 12, 1887 (aged 62) Sheboygan Falls, Wisconsin, U.S.
- Cause of death: Cancer
- Resting place: Sheboygan Falls Cemetery, Sheboygan Falls
- Party: Democratic
- Spouse: Justine Christine Kaestner (m. 1845–1887)
- Children: Barbara Helen (Mueller)^{(b. 1846; died 1943)}; Louis Wolf^{(b. 1848; died 1848)}; William Wolf^{(b. 1850; died 1925)}; Justine Magdalena (Eckel)^{(b. 1853; died 1938)}; Christina Wolf^{(b. 1854)}; Elizabeth "Sadie" (Maulick) (Baum)^{(b. 1857; died 1936)}; Louis Charles Wolf^{(b. 1859; died 1944)}
- Occupation: Cordwainer, Boot and shoe manufacturer & retailer

Louis Wolf (born Friedrich Ludwig Wolff; September 14, 1825 – December 12, 1887) was a German American immigrant, businessman, Democratic politician, and Wisconsin pioneer. He served two years in the Wisconsin Senate (1878, 1879), and three years in the state Assembly (1864, 1874, 1876), representing Sheboygan County.

== Early life and business career ==
Louis Wolf was born Friedrich Ludwig Wolff in Dürkheim, in the Rheinkreis (Palatinate) district of the Kingdom of Bavaria (present day Rhineland-Palatinate, Germany). He was raised and received his early education in Bavaria. At age 13, he emigrated to the United States with his family; they purchased passage aboard the American packet boat Louis Phillippe from Le Havre to New York City, arriving on May 27, 1839. The family settled in Utica, New York, among several other German American immigrants. As a young man in Utica, Louis apprenticed as a shoemaker and cordwainer.

In 1848, Louis ventured west to Sheboygan, Wisconsin, with his wife and her father and siblings. Louis worked as a shoemaker for several years in Sheboygan, before moving to the neighboring village of Sheboygan Falls, Wisconsin, where he started his own boot and shoe business. His business prospered and became one of the largest retail boot and shoe businesses in the county. In 1857, he put some of his profits into starting a brewery with wagonmaker Heinrich Dicke, but sold his share of the business after only a few years.

== Political career ==
He obtained his first public office in 1857, when he was appointed a deputy sheriff. In 1860, he made his first bid for elected office, running for sheriff of Sheboygan County on the Democratic Party ticket; he lost the general election to Frederick Aude.

His next run for public office came in 1863, when he was elected to represent Sheboygan County in the 17th Wisconsin Legislature. He was renominated in 1864, but lost the general election to Cephas Whipple.

He returned to the Assembly in the 1874 term, with the brief success of the Reform coalition. He did not run for re-election in 1874, but won a third term in 1875. He then ran for Wisconsin Senate in 1877, and won a two-year term representing Wisconsin's 20th Senate district. At the time, the 20th district comprised all of Sheboygan County and the eastern quarter of Fond du Lac County.

== Later years ==
Wolf's business was destroyed in a major fire in 1879. The building was insured, but he lost hundreds of dollars' worth of uninsured merchandise and materials. He did rebuild his business, however, and remained one of the largest boot and shoe dealers in the region.

== Personal life and family ==
Friedrich Ludwig Wolf was the last of ten known children of Carl August Wolff and his wife Maria Anna Christina (née Rippel), of Dürkheim. The Wolff family had resided in Dürkheim for several generations.

Louis Wolf married Augusta Magdalena "Justina Christine" Kaestner in 1845 at Utica, New York. The Kaestners were also German emigrants; she had been born in the city of Erfurt, in the Province of Saxony. They had at least seven children together, though at least one died in infancy and another died young. Their eldest daughter, Barbara Helen, married tannery businessman Charles Mueller who later served as mayor of Port Washington, Wisconsin.

Wolf suffered for several months with pancreatic cancer before dying at his home in Sheboygan Falls on December 12, 1887, at the age of 62. He was survived by his wife and five children.

Wisconsin State Assembly
Preceded by Charles Œtling	Member of the Wisconsin State Assembly from the Sheboygan 2nd district January 4, 1864 – January 2, 1865	Succeeded by Cephas Whipple
Preceded by Peter Daane	Member of the Wisconsin State Assembly from the Sheboygan 3rd district January 5, 1874 – January 4, 1875	Succeeded by Nathaniel Farnsworth
Preceded by Nathaniel Farnsworth	Member of the Wisconsin State Assembly from the Sheboygan 3rd district January 3, 1876 – January 1, 1877	Succeeded by Ambrose Delos DeLand
Wisconsin Senate
Preceded by Daniel Cavanagh	Member of the Wisconsin Senate from the 20th district January 7, 1878 – January 5, 1880	Succeeded by Patrick Henry Smith
