= Peter Daane =

American politician (1835–1914

Member of the Wisconsin State Assembly from the Sheboygan 3rd district
- In office January 6, 1873 – January 5, 1874
- Preceded by: Major Shaw
- Succeeded by: Louis Wolf

Personal details
- Born: March 26, 1835 Westkapelle, Zeeland, Netherlands
- Died: January 7, 1914 (aged 78) Oostburg, Wisconsin, U.S.
- Resting place: Oostburg Cemetery, Cedar Grove, Wisconsin
- Party: Republican
- Spouses: Susanna Eernisse (m. 1854; died 1896); Anna Pieternella Back (née Faas) (m. 1897–1914)
- Children: Suzanna (DeMunck)^{(b. 1855; died 1927)}; Nellie (Hundling)^{(b. 1858; died 1943)}; Peter J. Daane^{(b. 1860; died 1941)}; Aplonia (Zuurmond)^{(b. 1862; died 1946)}; Jacob Peter Daane^{(b. 1864; died 1937)}; Elizabeth (Theune)^{(b. 1869; died 1935)}; Matthew Daane^{(b. 1871; died 1958)}; Harry A. Daane^{(b. 1877; died 1936)}

Military service
- Allegiance: United States
- Branch/service: United States Volunteers; Union Army
- Years of service: 1862–1865
- Rank: 1st Lieutenant, USV
- Unit: 27th Reg. Wis. Vol. Infantry
- Battles/wars: American Civil War

Peter Daane (March 26, 1835 – January 7, 1914) was a Dutch American immigrant, businessman, and Wisconsin pioneer. He was a member of the Wisconsin State Assembly, representing southern Sheboygan County during the 1873 session.

== Biography ==
Peter Daane was born in Westkapelle, Zeeland, in the Netherlands. As a child in 1842, he emigrated with his family to the United States and settled at Pultneyville, New York. In 1847, they moved west to Milwaukee, Wisconsin Territory, then north to Sheboygan County, Wisconsin, where they settled on a farm in the town of Holland. Daane was educated in the public schools of New York and Wisconsin and went to work as a merchant.

In the second year of the American Civil War, Daane volunteered for service in the Union Army and was enrolled as a sergeant in Company F in the 27th Wisconsin Infantry Regiment. He was later promoted to first sergeant, and was commissioned first lieutenant in July 1864. Daane served with the regiment in the western theater of the war, participating in the Vicksburg campaign and campaigns in Alabama and Arkansas.

After the war, Daane served as assessor of the town of Holland and chairman of the Holland Town Board. In 1873, Daane served in the Wisconsin State Assembly and was a Republican. In 1879, Daane bought a mill, elevator, and lumberyard in Oostburg, Wisconsin. He also served as postmaster of Oostburg, Wisconsin. Daane died in Oostburg, Wisconsin of a heart ailment.

== Electoral history ==
=== Wisconsin Assembly (1872) ===
Wisconsin Assembly, Sheboygan 3rd District Election, 1872
Party	Candidate	Votes	%	±%
General Election, November 4, 1872
Republican	Peter Daane	1,140	60.74%	+10.45%
Democratic	Josiah Platt	737	39.26%	
Plurality		403	21.47%	+20.90%
Total votes		1,877	100.0%	+51.98%
Republican hold				

Wisconsin State Assembly
Preceded by Major Shaw	Member of the Wisconsin State Assembly from the Sheboygan 3rd district January 6, 1873 – January 5, 1874	Succeeded by Louis Wolf
