= Bichler =

Bichler is a surname. Notable people with the surname include:

- Florian Bichler (born 1991), German footballer
- Heinrich Bichler (1466–1497), Swiss painter
- Hubert Bichler (born 1959), German sport shooter
- Nicholas J. Bichler (1895–1961), American politician
- Nimrod Bichler (born 1974), Israeli wheelchair tennis coach
- Shimshon Bichler, Israeli political economist
- Timo Bichler (born 1999), German racing cyclist
- William J. Bichler (1870–1926), American politician
