= Walvoord =

Walvoord is a surname. Notable people with the surname include:

- Henry Walvoord (1847–1909), American farmer and politician
- John Walvoord (1910–2002), American Christian theologian
