= Ozaukee Interurban Trail =

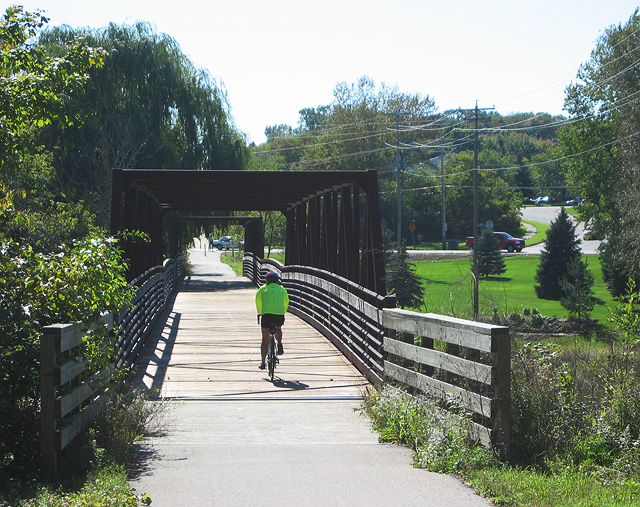
- The Ozaukee portion of the Interurban Trail, as it crosses the Milwaukee River and Green Bay Road in Grafton.
- Location: eastern Wisconsin
- Established: 2002
- Website: www.interurbantrail.com

The Ozaukee - Sheboygan Interurban Trail is a roughly 40-mile (64 km) long rail trail in Ozaukee, and Sheboygan Counties, in Wisconsin. The south end of the trail is in Milwaukee County but only runs 1 mile through the county.

It uses the abandoned right-of-way of The Milwaukee Electric Railway and Light Company interurban passenger railway line which ran from Sheboygan to Milwaukee. The southern end of the trail is at Bradley Road in Brown Deer which connects to the Oak Leaf Trail (43°09′48″N 87°57′39″W), and its northern end is at DeMaster Road in the Village of Oostburg, Sheboygan County (43°36′57″N 87°48′08″W). It runs through the communities of Brown Deer, Mequon, Thiensville, Cedarburg, Grafton, Port Washington, Belgium, Cedar Grove, and Oostburg.

The trail is open to non-motorized pastimes, such as bicycling, rollerblading, cross-country skiing, jogging and birdwatching.

While most of the trail is on the railway right-of-way, some sections are diverted to city streets and country roads because of safety concerns or where the railroad sections are unusable.

Oversight of the trail in Ozaukee County is by the Ozaukee Interurban Trail Advisory Council. Subcommittees include Rules and Ordinance Development, Sustainability Committee, Trailside Facilities and Trail Promotions. Oversight of the portion of the Interurban Trail in Sheboygan County is under the Sheboygan County Planning and Resources Department and the Planning, Resources, Agriculture, and Extension Committee of the Sheboygan County Board of Supervisors.

== History ==
The Milwaukee Electric Railway ran a passenger line between Milwaukee and Sheboygan from 1905 to 1951. The company became part of Wisconsin Electric (now We Energies), and the land was retained by that company after the railway ceased operation, to serve as a right-of-way for overhead power lines. Some segments of the right-of-way were turned into bike paths in 1975. In 1998, the county and several of its communities received state funding to build the trail. Much of the land for the trail is leased from the power company. Much of the trail was built on old railroad beds, so little work was needed to convert the land to a bike trail. A bridge over the Milwaukee River in Grafton was completed in March 2002. An official opening celebration was held on September 28, 2002, in Port Washington.

A 415-foot bridge over Interstate 43 and County Highway W in the Town of Grafton was completed in late September 2009 at a cost of $1.76 million. Private donations funded 20%, while the state funded the remaining 80%. Though it was expected to be built in the summer of 2006, the state Department of Transportation imposed design changes that boosted the cost of the bridge by $650,000. The changes were based on the DOT's decision that the bridge needed to be handicap accessible.

In Sheboygan County, the initial stretch of the Interurban Trail between the Ozaukee - Sheboygan County line to Cedar Grove was constructed in 2005. The next portion of the Trail between Cedar Grove and Oostburg was constructed in 2007. There are also plans to extend the Trail from the Village of Oostburg into the City of Sheboygan via Kohler Andrae State Park; thus connecting the Ozaukee Interurban Trail with Sheboygan's existing urban bikeway network, and with the Old Plank Road Trail, which stretches west from the City of Sheboygan to the Village of Greenbush, a distance of about 17 miles. Long term plans are to extend the Interurban Trail from Sheboygan, north about 65 miles to Green Bay and connect it to other points west and north via existing trails.

== See also ==
- List of bike trails in Wisconsin
- Rail trail
