= Holy Cross, Wisconsin =

Unincorporated community in Ozaukee County, Wisconsin

- Unincorporated community
- Location within Wisconsin Location within the United States
- Coordinates: 43°28′13″N 87°53′44″W
- Country: United States
- State: Wisconsin
- County: Ozaukee
- Elevation: 774 ft (236 m)
- Time zone: UTC-6 (Central (CST))
  - Summer (DST): UTC-5 (CDT)
- Postal code: 53004
- Area code: 262
- GNIS feature ID: 1566584

Holy Cross is an unincorporated community located in the town of Belgium in Ozaukee County, Wisconsin, United States. Holy Cross is located just east of Fredonia and southwest of Belgium.

Holy Cross, like nearby Dacada, was settled by immigrants from Luxembourg in the 1840s and 1850s. The name for the community comes from the former Catholic parish of Holy Cross, which was formed in the area in 1845.
