= Belgium, Wisconsin =

Village in Ozaukee County, Wisconsin

- Village
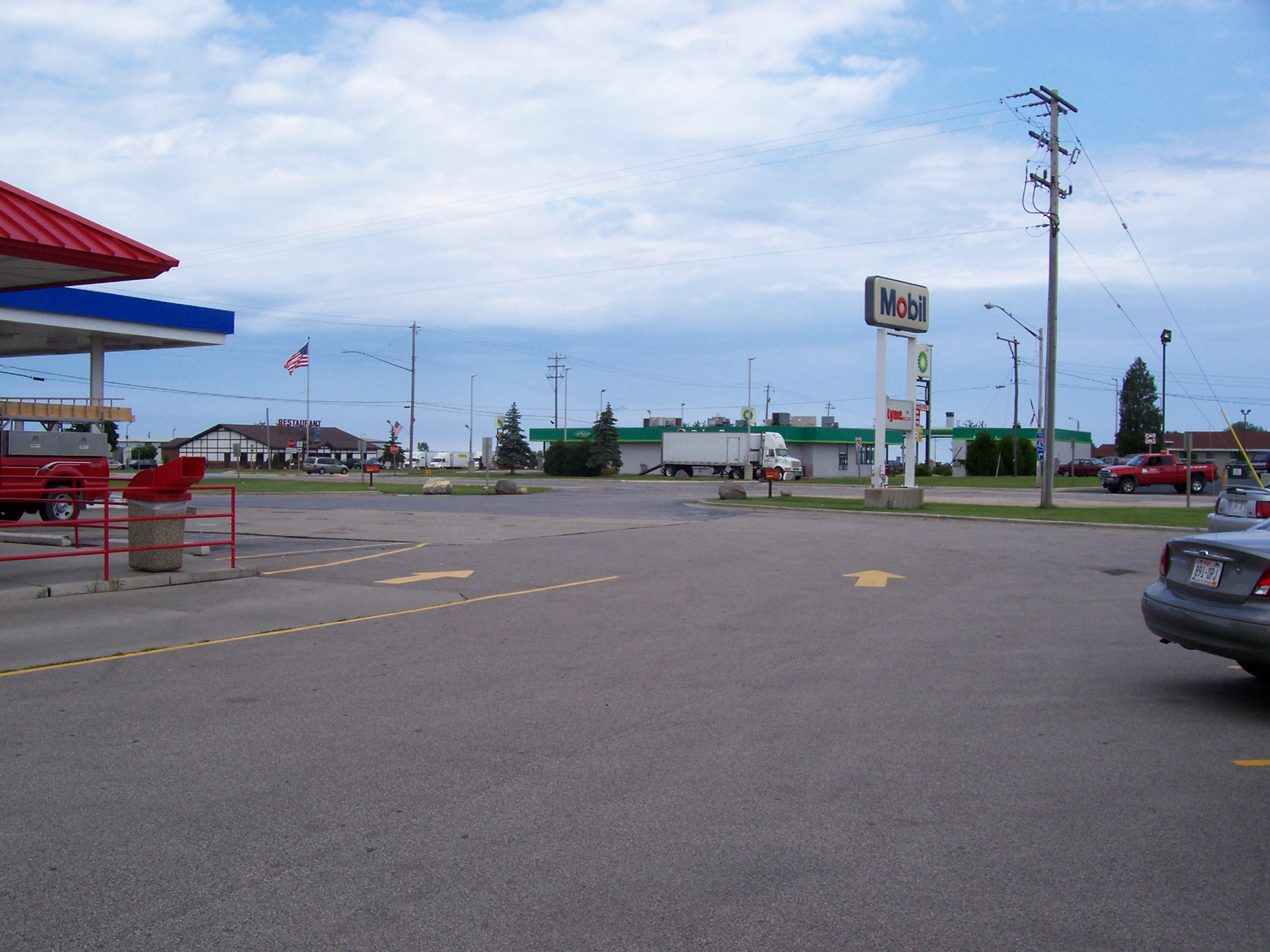
- Looking east at Belgium's business district

- Location of Belgium in Ozaukee County, Wisconsin.
- Coordinates: 43°29′39″N 87°51′33″W
- Country: United States
- State: Wisconsin
- County: Ozaukee
- Settled: 1840s
- Incorporated: 1922; 104 years ago

Government
  - Village President: Roseann Geib
  - Clerk: Julie Lesar
  - Treasurer: Vickie Boehnlein
  - Village board: Trustees: Josh Borden; Don Gotcher; Clem Gottsacker; Sarah Heisler; Rose Sauers; Daniel Wolff

Area
  - Total: 2.15 sq mi (5.58 km^{2})
  - Land: 2.15 sq mi (5.58 km^{2})
  - Water: 0 sq mi (0.00 km^{2})
- Elevation: 738 ft (225 m)

Population (2020)
  - Total: 2,421
  - Density: 1,089.2/sq mi (420.56/km^{2})
- Time zone: UTC-6 (Central (CST))
  - Summer (DST): UTC-5 (CDT)
- Area code: 262
- FIPS code: 55-06175
- GNIS feature ID: 1582781
- Website: www.belgiumwi.gov

Belgium is a village in Ozaukee County, Wisconsin, United States. Located along Interstate 43, the village is one of the northernmost communities in the Milwaukee metropolitan area. The population was 2,421 at the 2020 census.

Beginning in the 1840s, immigrant farmers from Luxembourg settled in Northern Ozaukee County and formed several rural communities, including Belgium as well as the neighboring hamlets of Dacada, Holy Cross, and Lake Church. Although Belgium grew after a railroad was constructed through the community and incorporated as a village in 1922, the community remained primarily agricultural in the 20th century. As recently as 2015, the local cannery, which processes fruits and vegetables harvested at area farms, was by far the village's largest employer.

The village continues to have strong cultural ties to the Grand Duchy of Luxembourg. Members of the Grand Ducal Family of Luxembourg have visited, and the Luxembourg Government sponsors the Luxembourg American Cultural Society and Museum in the community. Among other programs, the center assists Americans of Luxembourgish ancestry in applying for dual citizenship, and since 1987 the village has hosted an annual festival devoted to Luxembourgish food and culture.

== Toponymy ==
Since its beginning, Belgium has had a large population of Luxembourgish Americans. In 1857, the immigrant settlers submitted the name "Luxembourg" to the U.S. Postal Service for review. At the same time, a group of Belgian-American settlers in Kewaunee County submitted the name "Belgium" as the name for their majority Belgian-American town. Due to a clerical error, the names were switched with the result that Belgium, Wisconsin, is a center of Luxembourgish-American settlement, and Luxemburg is a center of Belgian-American settlement.

== History ==
Northeastern Ozaukee County, including the town and village Belgium, was inhabited by several Native American tribes, including the Menominee. The Menominee surrendered the land that would become Belgium to the United States Federal Government through the 1832 Treaty of Washington.

In the late 1840s, immigrants from Luxembourg began to settle in what would become northeastern Ozaukee County. In 1848, the town of Belgium was created out of the town of Port Washington.

The Northwestern Railway Company set up a station in 1864. The Chicago, Milwaukee & St. Paul Railway began running through the community in 1872, spurring population growth. In the early 20th Century, Belgium was a stop on the Milwaukee Interurban Line, which ran between Milwaukee and Sheboygan from 1908 until 1948. The population began to concentrate around the railroad station, and the community incorporated as the Village of Belgium in 1922.

In 1945, sixty German prisoners of war from Camp Fredonia in Little Kohler, Wisconsin were contracted to work at Krier Preserving Company in the village to make up for the loss of labor due to local men fighting in World War II. The camp was under the command of Captain Ray Thill, a native of the Village of Belgium.

The Ozaukee County line of the Interurban declined and ceased operation following World War II, but the village continued to grow in the mid-20th Century after the construction of Interstate 43, connecting Milwaukee to Green Bay.

Since 1977, Belgium has been home to the Luxembourg American Cultural Society & Center, including the Roots and Leaves Museum, which is devoted to telling "the story of the Grand Duchy of Luxembourg, past and present, as well as Luxembourg immigration to America the impact of Luxembourg immigrants and their descendants on life in America." In 1987, Prince Henri, then-heir-apparent to the crown of Luxembourg, and Princess Maria Teresa visited the village. In 2016, Guillaume, Hereditary Grand Duke of Luxembourg and Stéphanie, Hereditary Grand Duchess of Luxembourg visited Belgium on a trip to the United States.

== Geography ==
The Village of Belgium is located at 43°30′2″N 87°50′48″W (43.500735, -87.846897). According to the United States Census Bureau, Belgium has a total area of 2.42 square miles (6.27 km^{2}), all land. The village is surrounded by the Town of Belgium and is located two miles (3 km) west of Lake Michigan and adjacent to conjoined Interstate 43-State Highway 32.

The village is located in the Southeastern Wisconsin glacial till plains that were created by the Wisconsin glaciation during the most recent ice age. The Wisconsin Department of Natural Resources considers the village to be in the Central Lake Michigan Coastal ecological landscape.

Before white settlers arrived in the area, the Belgium area was a mixture of upland and lowland forests. The upland forests were dominated by American beech and sugar maple trees, while the lowland conifer forests and swamps were dominated by white cedar and tamarack. Much of the original forest was cleared to prepare the land for agriculture.

As land development continues to reduce wild areas, wildlife is forced into closer proximity with human communities like Belgium. Large mammals, including white-tailed deer, coyotes, and red foxes can be seen in the village. The rural areas surrounding the village are also home to several bird habitats, including Harrington Beach State Park, which is located on the shore of Lake Michigan and is one of two Wisconsin Important Bird Areas in Ozaukee County. The open fields in the western part of the park are a breeding ground for upland sandpipers.

The region struggles with many invasive species, including the emerald ash borer, common carp, reed canary grass, the common reed, purple loosestrife, garlic mustard, Eurasian buckthorns, and honeysuckles. Some of the wetlands in the Town of Belgium are especially affected by reed canary grass, with the invasive species accounting for more than 50% of plant coverage along some stretches of Sucker Creek and the Onion River.

== Demographics ==
Historical population
| Census | Pop. | Note | %± |
|---|---|---|---|
| 1930 | 268 | | — |
| 1940 | 356 | | 32.8% |
| 1950 | 460 | | 29.2% |
| 1960 | 643 | | 39.8% |
| 1970 | 809 | | 25.8% |
| 1980 | 892 | | 10.3% |
| 1990 | 928 | | 4.0% |
| 2000 | 1,678 | | 80.8% |
| 2010 | 2,245 | | 33.8% |
| 2020 | 2,421 | | 7.8% |
U.S. Decennial Census

=== 2020 census ===
As of the 2020 census, the village of Belgium had a population of 2,421. The population density was 1,044.2 inhabitants per square mile (403.2/km²). There were 865 housing units. The racial makeup of the village in 2020 was 94.48% White (non-Hispanic), 0.36% Black or African American, 0.18% American Indian and Alaska Native, 0.89% Asian, 0.0% Native Hawaiian and Other Pacific Islander, 0.94% Some Other Race, and 3.14% from two or more races. Hispanic or Latino of any race constituted 5.21% of the population. The median age in the village was 47.1 years. Females comprised 53.6% of the population and males 46.4%.

=== 2010 census ===
As of the census of 2010, there were 2,245 people, 817 households, and 608 families residing in the village. The population density was 927.7 inhabitants per square mile (358.2/km^{2}). There were 848 housing units at an average density of 350.4 per square mile (135.3/km^{2}). The racial makeup of the village was 94.5% white, 0.4% African American, 0.4% Native American, 0.9% Asian, 2.9% from other races, and 0.8% from two or more races. Hispanic or Latino of any race were 5.2% of the population.

There were 817 households, of which 41.9% had children under the age of 18 living with them, 66.0% were married couples living together, 5.1% had a female householder with no husband present, 3.3% had a male householder with no wife present, and 25.6% were non-families. 20.7% of all households were made up of individuals, and 6% had someone living alone who was 65 years of age or older. The average household size was 2.74 and the average family size was 3.24.

The median age in the village was 35 years. 29.7% of residents were under the age of 18; 4.6% were between the ages of 18 and 24; 33.8% were from 25 to 44; 23.5% were from 45 to 64; and 8.3% were 65 years of age or older. The gender makeup of the village was 51.0% male and 49.0% female.

=== 2000 census ===
As of the census of 2000, there were 1,678 people, 582 households, and 444 families residing in the village. The population density was 1,163.0 people per square mile (449.9/km^{2}). There were 592 housing units at an average density of 410.3 per square mile (158.7/km^{2}). The racial makeup of the village was 96.31% white, 0.48% Black or African American, 0.42% Native American, 0.18% Asian, 1.49% from other races, and 1.13% from two or more races. 4.11% of the population were Hispanic or Latino of any race. There were 1582 households, out of which 44.5% had children under the age of 18 living with them, 67.9% were married couples living together, 5.8% had a female householder with no husband present, and 23.7% were non-families. 19.6% of all households were made up of individuals, and 7.4% had someone living alone who was 65 years of age or older. The average household size was 2.85 and the average family size was 3.31.

In the village, the population was spread out, with 31.8% under the age of 18, 6.8% from 18 to 24, 36.1% from 25 to 44, 16.5% from 45 to 64, and 8.8% who were 65 years of age or older. The median age was 32 years. For every 100 females, there were 101.2 males. For every 100 females age 18 and over, there were 99.5 males.

The median income for a household in the village was $53,523, and the median income for a family was $59,375. Males had a median income of $40,152 versus $25,609 for females. The per capita income for the village was $20,659. About 1.8% of families and 2.4% of the population were below the poverty line, including 2.8% of those under age 18 and 6.0% of those age 65 or over.

== Culture ==
Northern Ozaukee County — including the Belgium community — was a center of Luxembourgish-American settlement in the United States in the 19th century, and the Village of Belgium continues to have strong cultural ties to the Grand Duchy of Luxembourg. Banners along Main Street read "Wëllkomm," which means "Welcome" in Luxembourgish. Since 1977, Belgium has been home to the Luxembourg American Cultural Society & Center, which is sponsored by the Luxembourg Government Ministry of Culture and Ministry of Economy. The society facilitates a program to help Americans of Luxembourgish ancestry get dual citizenship, organizes guided tours of the Grand Duchy, and maintains a museum devoted to the history of Luxembourg and Luxembourgish immigration to the United States. Since 1987, the society has also organized an annual Luxembourg Fest featuring tradition cuisine such as träipen.

Many of the Luxembourgers who settled in northern Ozaukee County were Catholic and established Catholic parishes in rural parts of the county. The hamlets of Dacada, Holy Cross, and Lake Church in the Town of Belgium formed around Catholic parishes that primarily served Luxembourger farmers. The Village of Belgium is also home to two evangelical churches — Belgium Community Church and Christian Life Church — as well as St. Mark Lutheran Church, which is affiliated with the Missouri Synod.

== Economy ==
Largest Employers in Belgium, 2015
| Rank | Employer | Industry | Employees |
|---|---|---|---|
| 1 | Lakeside Foods, Inc. | Fruit and vegetable canning | 250-499 |
| 2 | Appleland | Fruit and vegetable wholesaling | 50-99 |
| 3 | Holiday Trims | Christmas tree ornament manufacturing | 50-99 |
| 4 | Trimen Industries, Inc. | Metal coating and engraving | 50-99 |
| 5 | Belgium Gardens | Retirement community | 20-49 |
| 6 | Hobo's Korner Kitchen | Restaurant | 20-49 |
| 7 | McDonald's | Fast food restaurant | 20-49 |
| 8 | Sharon Cutwell Co. Inc. | Cutting tool and machine tool accessory manufacturing | 20-49 |

== Law and government ==
Belgium is organized as a village governed by an elected village board, comprising a village president and six trustees who are elected to three-year terms. The current president is Pete Anzia, who was elected to his first term in April 2014.

As part of Wisconsin's 6th congressional district, Belgium is represented by Glenn Grothman (R) in the United States House of Representatives, and by Ron Johnson (R) and Tammy Baldwin (D) in the United States Senate. Duey Stroebel (R) represents Belgium in the Wisconsin State Senate, and Robert Brooks (R) represents Belgium in the Wisconsin State Assembly.

The village is served by the Belgium Volunteer Fire Department, which operates one fire station in the village. The department does not have its own ambulances an relies upon the neighboring Village of Fredonia's fire department for ambulance service.

Belgium's law enforcement officer is the village marshal. Unlike a municipality with a police department, the village marshal does not provide 24-hour law enforcement, and the village is served by the Ozaukee County Sheriff's Department when the marshal is off duty and in emergency situations.

== Education ==
The village is served by the joint Cedar Grove-Belgium School District. Students attend Cedar Grove-Belgium Elementary School for kindergarten through fourth grade, Cedar Grove-Belgium Middle School for fifth through eighth grades, and Cedar Grove-Belgium High School for ninth through twelfth grades. All of the district's schools are located in Cedar Grove, Sheboygan County, north of the Village of Belgium. The district is governed by a seven-member elected board of education.

The Cedar Grove-Belgium School District made national headlines in April 2024 when the desired characteristics listed by the Board of Education in its official search for a new Superintendent of Schools cited "Christian Values" as well as "conservative politics" as those characteristics sought in a successful candidate. Questions were raised in many quarters about the legality of a "religious test" for the position in light of the provisions of the Civil Rights Act of 1964, as well as the propriety of insisting on specific political views. Subsequent to publication of the District's Search Document, a public meeting concerning the Search was abruptly cancelled.

== Transportation ==
Interstate 43 runs parallel to the village's eastern municipal boundary with access via Exit 107.

Ozaukee County Transit Services' Shared Ride Taxi provides a public transit option for Belgium residents. The taxis operate seven days a week and make connections to Washington County Transit and Milwaukee County Routes 12, 49 and 42u. Unlike a typical taxi, however, the rider must contact the service ahead of time to schedule their pick-up date and time. The taxi service plans their routes based on the number of riders, pick-up/drop-off time and destination then plans the routes accordingly.

The Ozaukee Interurban Trail, which is for pedestrian and bicycle use, passes through Belgium and connects the village to the neighboring communities of Port Washington and Cedar Grove, and continues north to Oostburg and south to Milwaukee County.

The Union Pacific Railroad operates a freight rail line running parallel to the Ozaukee Interurban Trail in the village, but Belgium currently does not have a passenger train station.

== Parks and recreation ==
The Village of Belgium maintains six public parks with amenities including baseball and softball diamonds; basketball, tennis, and volleyball courts; an ice-skating rink; picnic shelters; playgrounds; soccer fields; a splash pad; a three-acre fenced dog park; and walking trails. Grand Duke Henri Plaza, located between the village hall and the Luxembourg American Cultural Center, contains the "Wisconsin's Luxembourgers" State Historical Marker as well as a statue of Henri, Grand Duke of Luxembourg, who visited the village in 1987.

Harrington Beach State Park, the only Wisconsin State Park in Ozaukee County, is located directly east of the village on the shore of Lake Michigan.

The Ozaukee Interurban Trail runs through the village, following the former route of the Milwaukee Interurban Rail Line. The southern end of the trail is at Bradley Road in Brown Deer which connects to the Oak Leaf Trail (43°09′48″N 87°57′39″W), and its northern end is at DeMaster Road in the Village of Oostburg Sheboygan County (43°36′57″N 87°48′08″W). The trail connects the community to neighboring Port Washington and Cedar Grove.

The Wisconsin Shipwreck Coast National Marine Sanctuary was established in 2021 in the waters of Lake Michigan off Belgium.

== Notable people ==
- Nicholas J. Bichler - Wisconsin State Representative
- William J. Bichler - Wisconsin State Senator
- Henry Ellenbecker - Wisconsin State Representative

== See also ==
- List of villages in Wisconsin
