= Stonehaven, Wisconsin =

Ghost town in Ozaukee County, Wisconsin

- Ghost town
- Location within Wisconsin
- Coordinates: 43°29′32″N 87°48′3″W
- Country: United States
- State: Wisconsin
- County: Ozaukee
- Elevation: 587 ft (179 m)

Stonehaven is a former community in the Town of Belgium, Ozaukee County, Wisconsin, United States. From 1901 until 1925, the community was a company town of the Lake Shore Stone Company, which operated a 25-acre dolomite quarry in the area near the western shore of Lake Michigan. The land is now the site of Harrington Beach State Park.

== History ==
In the 1890s, Milwaukee businessman David Whittaker founded the Northwestern Stone Company to begin quarrying dolomite in the Town of Belgium, along the Lake Michigan shore. Whittaker's company failed and the Lake Shore Stone Company purchased the quarry in 1901. At the company's height, quarrying operations spanned 25 acres and employed as many as 150 labors each day, using dynamite to break up the stone, load it into carts, and take it to a crusher. The crushed stone was then taken to a pier on Lake Michigan where it was shipped around the region to be used for road construction.

The Lake Shore Stone Company developed Stonehaven as a company town so its employees could live near the quarry. Most of the workers were immigrants from Luxembourg, the Austro-Hungarian Empire, and Italy. Families lived in 15 by 24 foot cottages, while unmarried men lived in two dormitories. The company also operated a store where workers could redeem tokens for goods.

In the 1920s, gravel began to replace crushed stone for road construction, and the Lake Shore Stone Company dissolved in 1925. The quarry closed and some of the houses in Stonehaven were moved three miles west to the Village of Belgium.

In 1968, the Wisconsin Department of Natural Resources began buying properties at the Stonehaven site, and in 1992 the land became the 715-acre Harrington Beach State Park. The quarry has flooded and is now a lake. The foundations of some of the Stonehaven buildings are preserved in the park.
