= William J. Bichler =

American politician

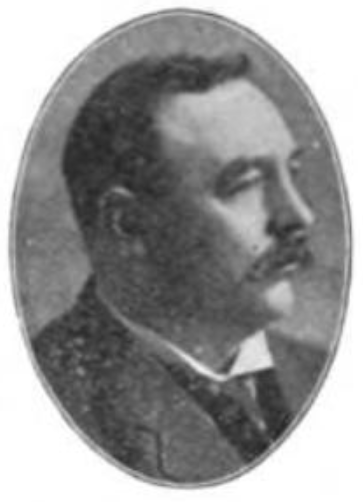

Member of the Wisconsin State Senate
- In office 1913–1915

Member of the Wisconsin State Assembly
- In office 1906–1910
- Constituency: Ozaukee County

Personal details
- Born: November 14, 1870 Holland, Sheboygan County, Wisconsin
- Died: December 6, 1926 (aged 56) Manitowoc, Wisconsin
- Party: Democratic
- Occupation: Farmer, politician

William J. Bichler (November 14, 1870 - December 6, 1926) was a member of the Wisconsin State Assembly and the Wisconsin State Senate.

== Biography ==
Bichler was born on November 14, 1870, in Holland, Sheboygan County, Wisconsin. In 1894, he moved to Belgium, Wisconsin.

His son, Nicholas J. Bichler, would also become a member of the Assembly.

William J. Bichler died in Manitowoc on December 6, 1926.

== Career ==
Bichler was elected to the Assembly in 1906 and was re-elected in 1908. He was a member of the Senate from 1913 to 1915. Previously, he was Chairman of Belgium and Chairman of the Ozaukee County Board. Bichler was also a delegate to the 1912 Democratic National Convention.
