= Nicholas J. Bichler =

American politician (1895–1961)

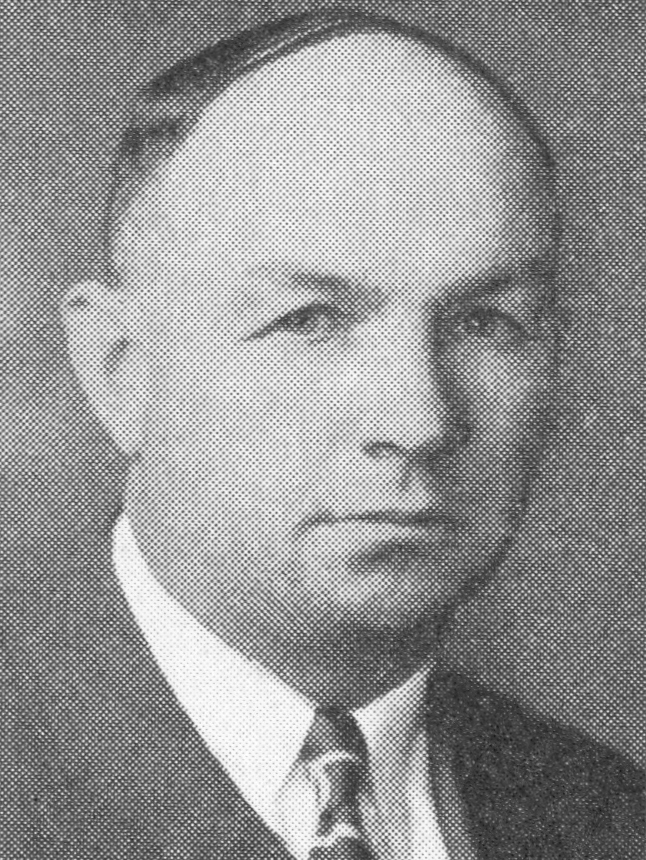
Bichler circa 1940

Nicholas J. Bichler (November 26, 1895 – November 29, 1961) was a member of the Wisconsin State Assembly.

He was born in Belgium, Wisconsin. His father, William J. Bichler, was a member of the Assembly and the Wisconsin State Senate. He attended St. Norbert College and the University of Wisconsin. On February 22, 1918, Bichler married Margaret Mueller. He died in Fredonia, Wisconsin and is buried in Lake Church, Wisconsin.

== Career ==
Bichler was a member of the Assembly from 1935 to 1942 and from 1951 to 1952. In 1956, he was an unsuccessful candidate for the Wisconsin State Senate. He was also Chairman of Belgium and a member of the Ozaukee County, Wisconsin Board, as well as a delegate to the 1940 Democratic National Convention.
