= Harrington Beach State Park =

State Park in Belgium and Ozaukee counties, Wisconsin

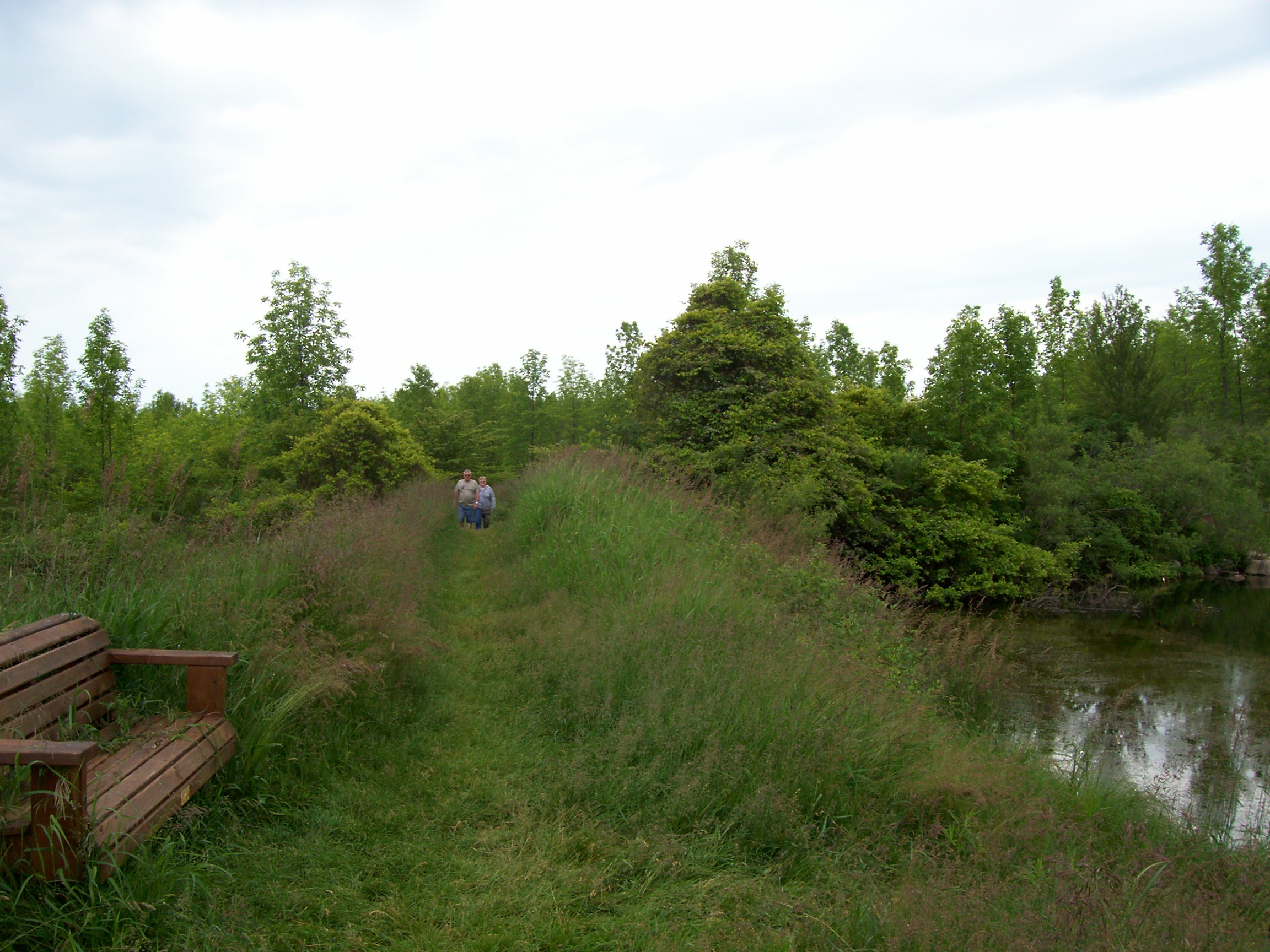

- Location within Wisconsin Location within the United States
- Interactive map of Harrington Beach State Park
- Location: Belgium, Ozaukee County, Wisconsin, United States
- Coordinates: 43°29′32″N 87°48′3″W
- Area: 715 acres (289 ha)
- Established: 1966
- Administrator: Wisconsin Department of Natural Resources
- Named for: C.L. Harrington, Wisconsin's first state park superintendent
- Website: Official website
- Wisconsin State Parks

Harrington Beach State Park is a 715-acre (289 ha) Wisconsin state park on the shore of Lake Michigan in the Town of Belgium. In addition to a mile-long beach, the park contains a white cedar swamp surrounding a 26-acre (11 ha) lake that used to be a stone quarry. The park provides campgrounds, hiking trails, picnic, and bird watch areas.

== History ==
From the 1890s until 1925, a dolomite quarry operated at the site of the park. From 1901 until 1925, the Lake Shore Stone Company developed a company town called Stonehaven at the site. Most of the workers were immigrants from Luxembourg, the Austro-Hungarian Empire, and Italy. When the quarry closed, some of the residential buildings were moved to the Village of Belgium. The foundations of some of the buildings remain in the state park.

In 1968, the Wisconsin Department of Natural Resources began buying the properties that would become Harrington Beach State Park. A campground of 73 sites opened in 2009; it was the first new campground at a Wisconsin State Park in over 20 years. Construction began in 2008 and it was completed in the beginning of September 2009. It opened with 32 electric sites, 33 non-electric sites, 5 walk-in sites, one kayak site (only accessible by water), one group campsite, and one site for the campground host. Before the campground was added, the park had up to 120,000 visitors per year.

== Recreation ==
The park has an accessible cabin, accessible campsite, accessible shelters, and accessible playground. Visitors can fish in Lake Michigan, Quarry Lake, or Puckett's Pond.

== Gallery ==
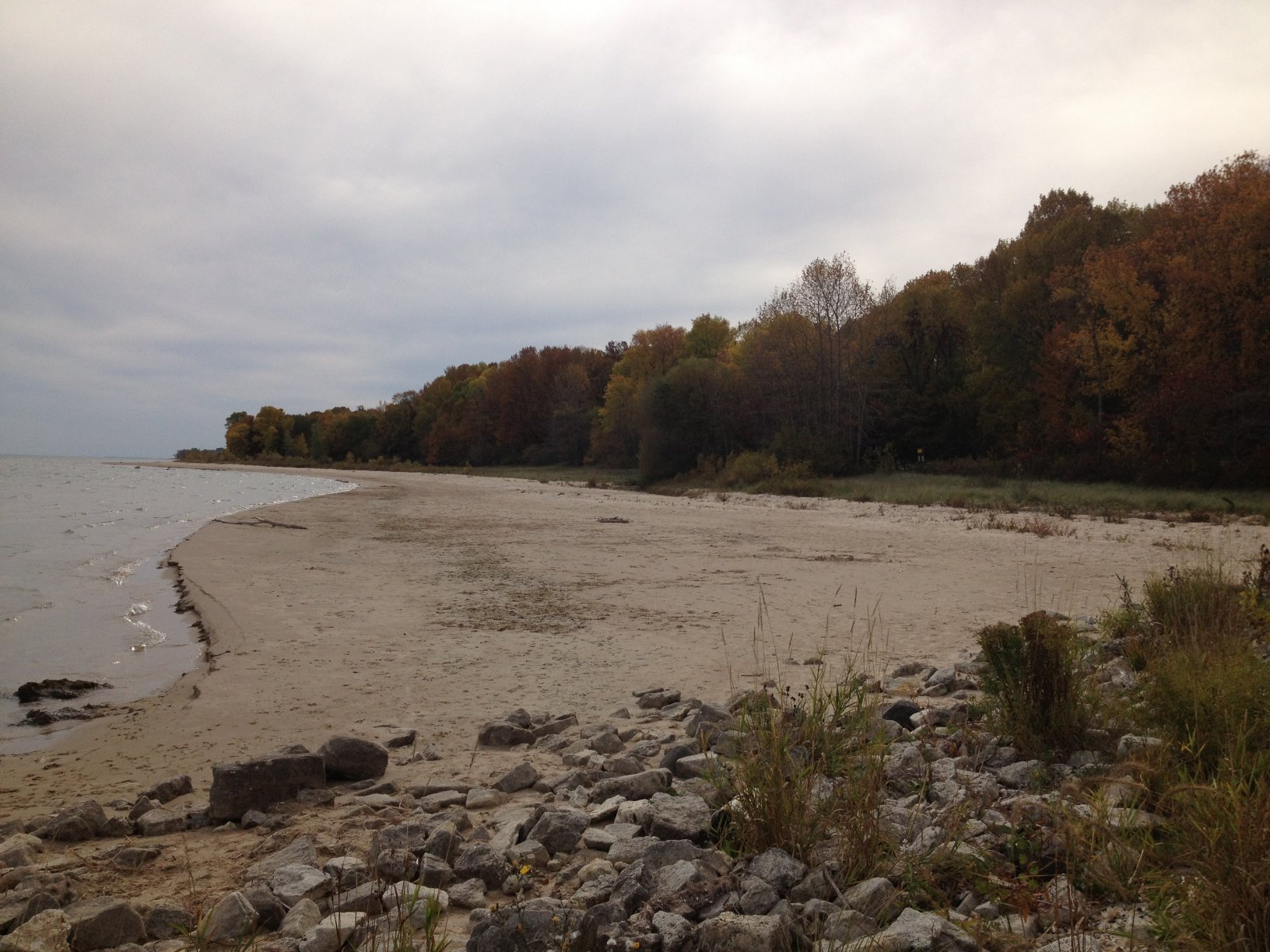
Beach and forest

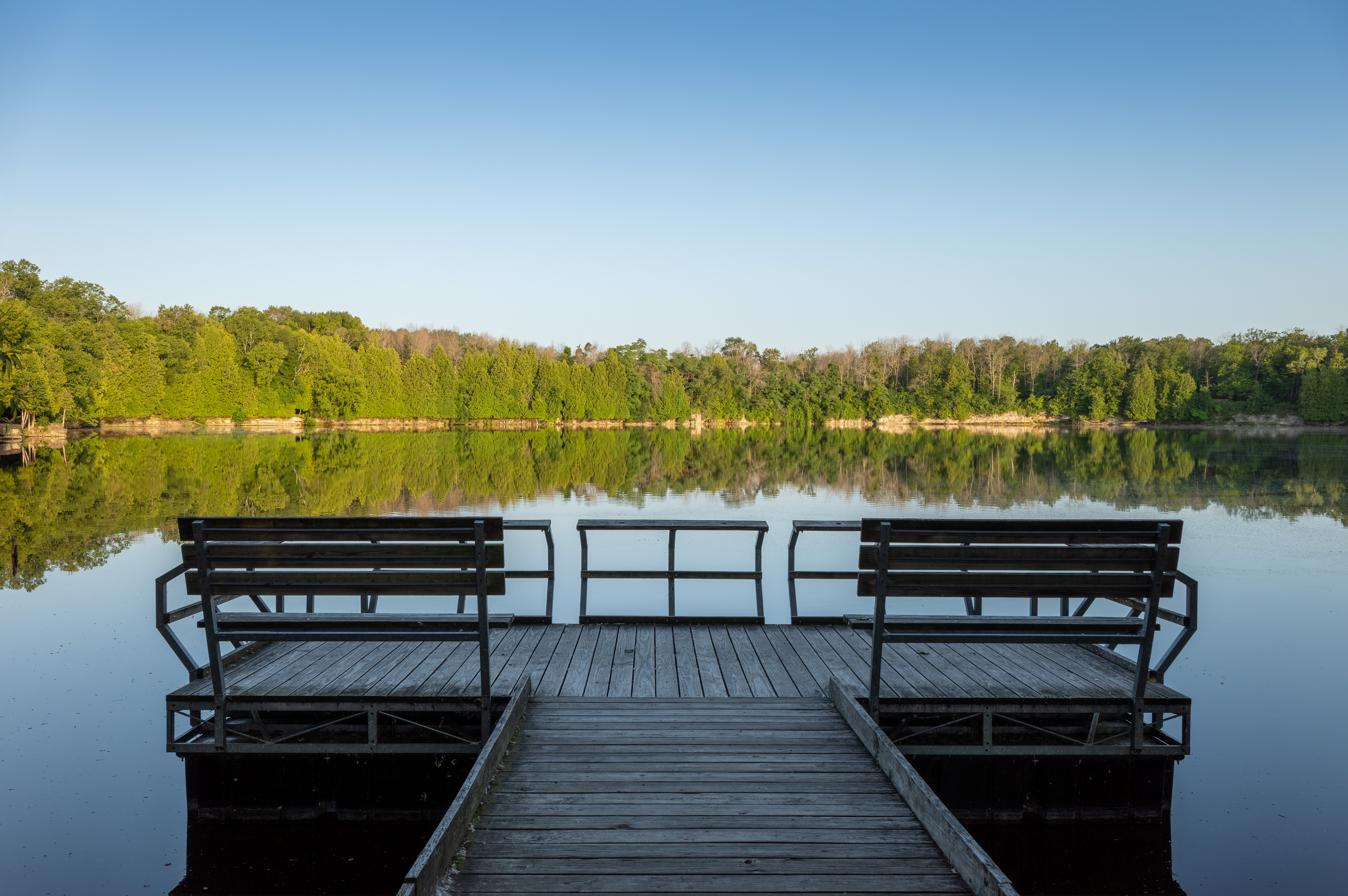
Quarry Lake
