= John J. Jungers =

American businessman and politician

John J. Jungers (October 24, 1864 – October 23, 1947) was an American businessman and politician.

Born in the town of Belgium, Ozaukee County, Wisconsin, Jungers was the president and owner of the Jungers Stove and Ranger Company in Grafton, Wisconsin. He was also in the grain buying, well drilling and hotel businesses.

In 1927, Jungers served in the Wisconsin State Assembly and was involved with the Republican Party.

Jungers died at his home in Grafton, Wisconsin, as a result of a stroke.
