= Decker, Wisconsin =

Unincorporated community in Ozaukee County, Wisconsin

- Unincorporated community
- Location within Wisconsin Location within the United States
- Coordinates: 43°28′14″N 87°51′45″W
- Country: United States
- State: Wisconsin
- County: Ozaukee
- Elevation: 738 ft (225 m)
- Time zone: UTC-6 (Central (CST))
  - Summer (DST): UTC-5 (CDT)
- Area code: 262
- GNIS feature ID: 1577567

Decker is an unincorporated community, in the town of Belgium, Ozaukee County, Wisconsin, United States.

== History ==
The community was named for the Decker family, early landowners.
