= Lion's Den Gorge Nature Preserve =

Public park

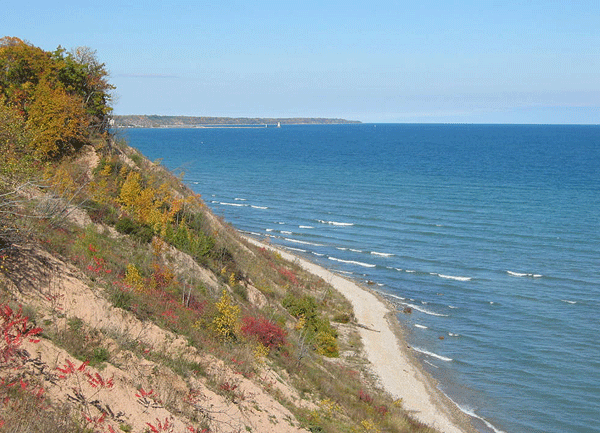
- Lake Michigan and the Lion's Den Gorge bluffs

- Location within Wisconsin
- Location: Ozaukee County, Wisconsin
- Nearest city: Port Washington and Grafton
- Coordinates: 43°20′28″N 87°53′05″W
- Established: 2002
- Governing body: Ozaukee County
- Website: Lion's Den Gorge Nature Preserve

Lion's Den Gorge Nature Preserve is a 73-acre public park located in Ozaukee County, Wisconsin, running adjacent to Lake Michigan for 0.7 miles near the village of Grafton and city of Port Washington. It was purchased by the county in 2002 from a private property owner and borders a 44-acre United States Fish and Wildlife Service waterfowl production area.

The park features over 1.5 miles of gravel and boardwalk trails through white cedar and hardwood forests, wetlands, and Lion's Den Gorge, with some sections of trails offering views of Lake Michigan from atop the nearly 100 foot tall bluffs. Following the "Lion's Den Trail" from the main parking lot takes one all the way through the park, down through the gorge, and finally to the lakeshore. Fishing, hiking, birdwatching, and picnicking are popular activities in the park, and the park contains several diverse habitats for native wildflowers, trees, migratory birds, waterfowl, amphibians and mammals.

== Photo gallery ==
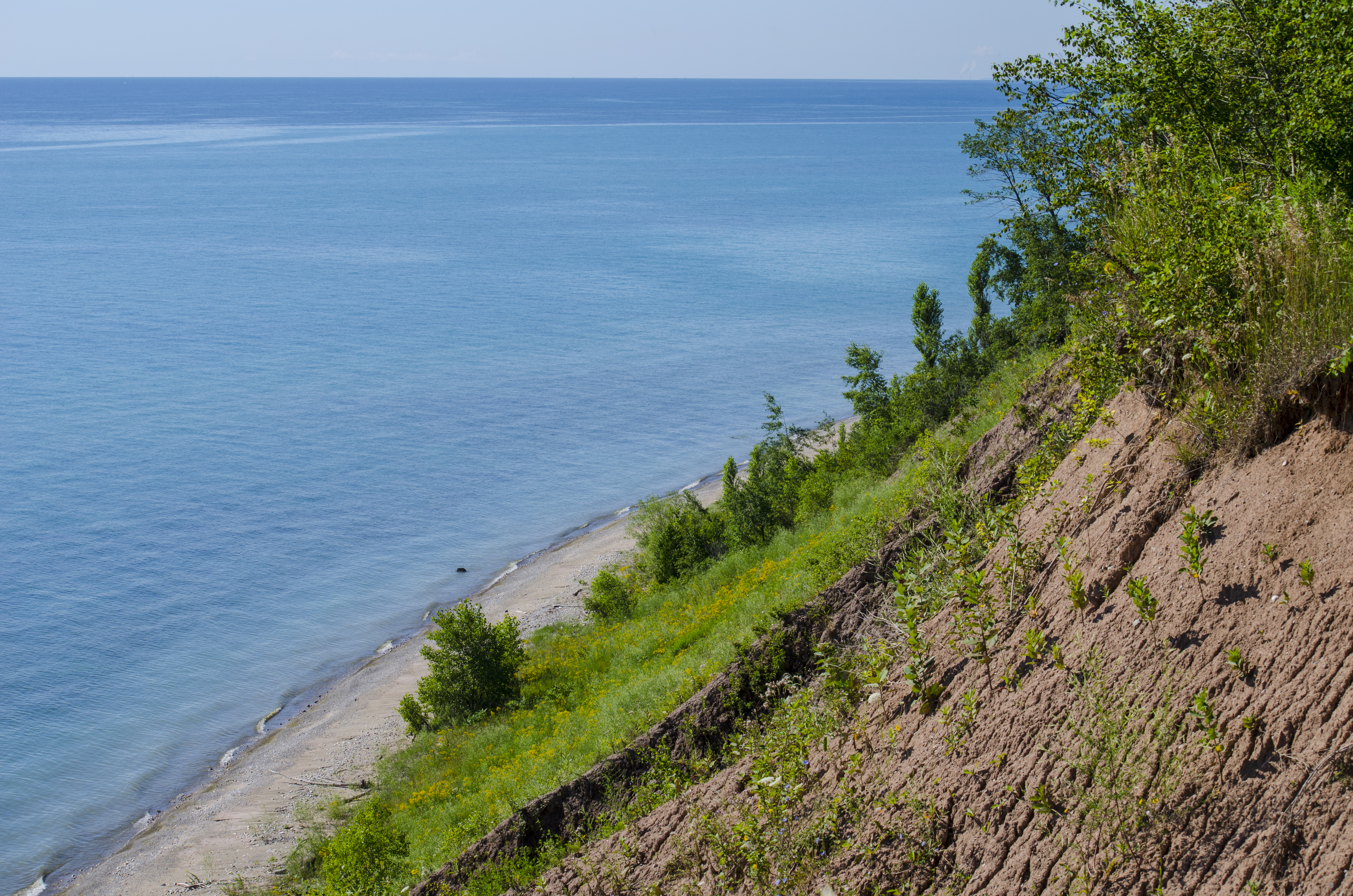
Lake Michigan from a hiking trail in the park
