= Louis L. Pierron =

Former member of the Wisconsin State Assembly

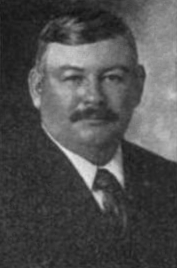

Member of the Wisconsin State Assembly
- In office 1919, 1921

Personal details
- Born: March 10, 1870 Belgium, Wisconsin, US
- Died: June 20, 1955 (aged 85) Plymouth, Wisconsin, US
- Party: Republican

Louis L. Pierron (1870–1955) was a member of the Wisconsin State Assembly.

== Biography ==
Pierron was born on March 10, 1870, in the town of Belgium, Wisconsin. He at one point attended high school in St. Francis, Wisconsin.

He died in Plymouth, Wisconsin on June 20, 1955.

== Career ==
Pierron was a member of the Assembly during the 1919 and 1921 sessions. Other positions he held include school board chairman and treasurer, as well as justice of the peace. He was a Republican.
