= Ambrose Delos DeLand =

American politician

Ambrose Delos DeLand was a member of the Wisconsin State Assembly.

== Biography ==
DeLand was born on March 30, 1841, in Chautauqua County, New York. On May 27, 1863, he married Mary Swett. He died on April 19, 1917, in Sheboygan, Wisconsin, and was buried in Sheboygan Falls, Wisconsin.

== Assembly career ==
DeLand was a member of the Assembly during the 1877 session. He was a Republican.
