= Cedar Grove, Wisconsin =

- Village
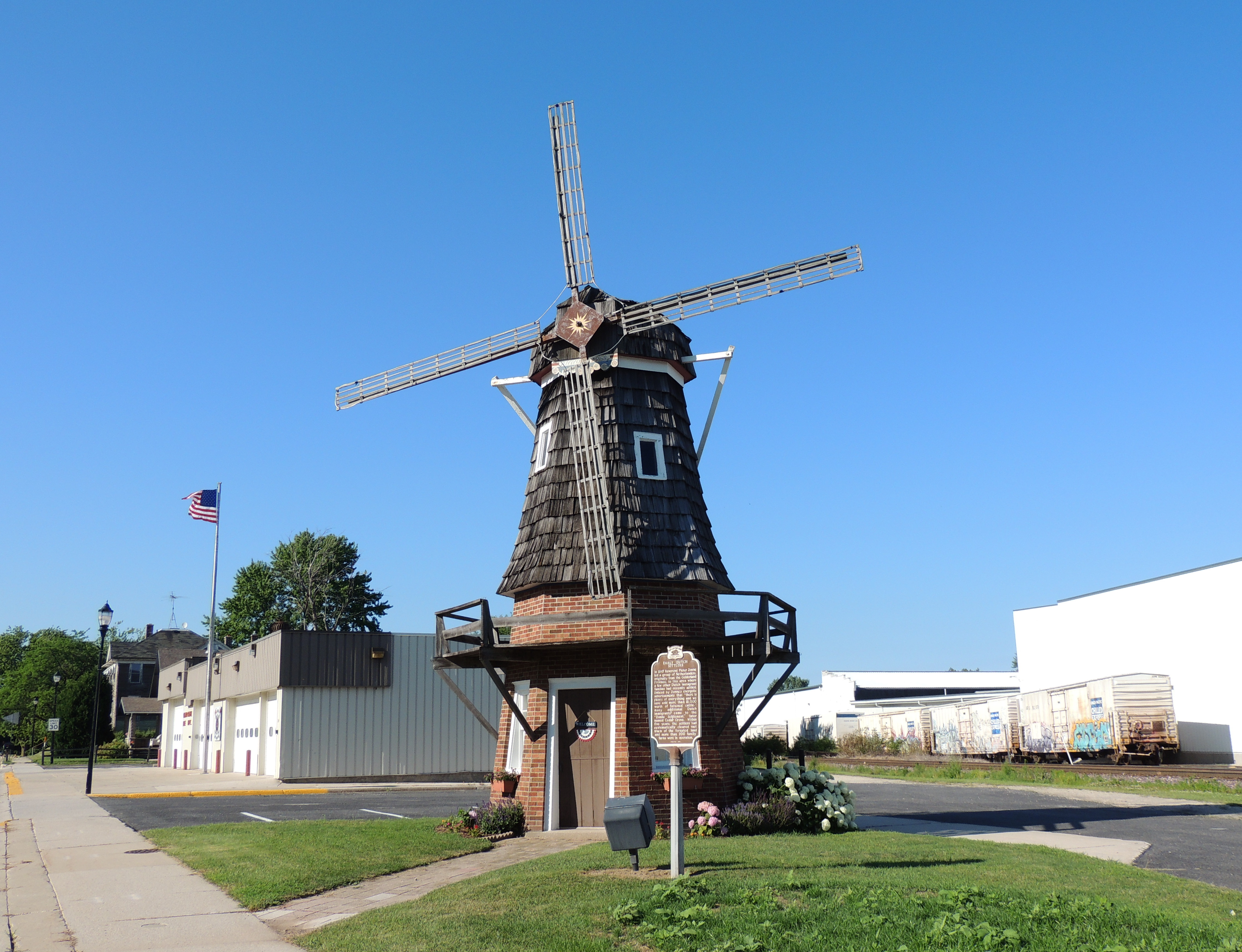
- Cedar Grove's Windmill Park, with a working replica windmill celebrating the community's Dutch roots with the Cedar Grove Fire Station in the background.

- Location of Cedar Grove in Sheboygan County, Wisconsin.
- Coordinates: 43°34′6″N 87°49′22″W
- Country: United States
- State: Wisconsin
- County: Sheboygan
- Town: Holland

Area
  - Total: 2.22 sq mi (5.74 km^{2})
  - Land: 2.19 sq mi (5.66 km^{2})
  - Water: 0.035 sq mi (0.09 km^{2})
- Elevation: 719 ft (219 m)

Population (2020)
  - Total: 2,101
  - Density: 969/sq mi (374.2/km^{2})
- Time zone: UTC-6 (Central (CST))
  - Summer (DST): UTC-5 (CDT)
- Area code: 920
- FIPS code: 55-13475
- GNIS feature ID: 1562844
- Website: www.cedargrovewi.com

Cedar Grove is a village in Sheboygan County, Wisconsin, United States, within the Town of Holland. The population was 2,101 at the 2020 census. It is included in the Sheboygan, Wisconsin Metropolitan Statistical Area.

== History ==
A post office called Cedar Grove has been in operation since 1849. The village was named from groves of cedar near the town site. The town was originally along Lake Michigan until railway lines came through the present site of Cedar Grove.

== Geography ==
According to the United States Census Bureau, the village has a total area of 2.18 square miles (5.65 km^{2}), of which 2.14 square miles (5.54 km^{2}) is land and 0.04 square miles (0.10 km^{2}) is water.

The Wisconsin Shipwreck Coast National Marine Sanctuary was established in 2021 in the waters of Lake Michigan off Cedar Grove.

== Demographics ==
Historical population
Census	Pop.	Note	%±
1900	327		—
1910	498		52.3%
1920	654		31.3%
1930	814		24.5%
1940	907		11.4%
1950	1,010		11.4%
1960	1,175		16.3%
1970	1,276		8.6%
1980	1,420		11.3%
1990	1,521		7.1%
2000	1,887		24.1%
2010	2,113		12.0%
2020	2,101		−0.6%
U.S. Decennial Census

=== 2010 census ===
As of the census of 2010, there were 2,113 people, 842 households, and 597 families living in the village. The population density was 987.4 inhabitants per square mile (381.2/km^{2}). There were 881 housing units at an average density of 411.7 per square mile (159.0/km^{2}). The racial makeup of the village was 97.8% White, 0.1% African American, 0.4% Native American, 0.4% Asian, 0.5% from other races, and 0.8% from two or more races. Hispanic or Latino of any race were 3.3% of the population.

There were 842 households, of which 35.0% had children under the age of 18 living with them, 60.8% were married couples living together, 6.2% had a female householder with no husband present, 3.9% had a male householder with no wife present, and 29.1% were non-families. 26.2% of all households were made up of individuals, and 14.5% had someone living alone who was 65 years of age or older. The average household size was 2.51 and the average family size was 3.02.

The median age in the village was 37.8 years. 27.2% of residents were under the age of 18; 6.5% were between the ages of 18 and 24; 26.6% were from 25 to 44; 24.7% were from 45 to 64; and 15% were 65 years of age or older. The gender makeup of the village was 50.2% male and 49.8% female.

=== 2000 census ===
As of the census of 2000, there were 1,887 people, 699 households, and 529 families living in the village. The population density was 917.9 people per square mile (353.7/km^{2}). There were 724 housing units at an average density of 352.2 per square mile (135.7/km^{2}). The racial makeup of the village was 98.36% White, 0.05% African American, 0.48% Native American, 0.16% Asian, 0.11% from other races, and 0.85% from two or more races. Hispanic or Latino of any race were 2.65% of the population.

There were 699 households, out of which 38.1% had children under the age of 18 living with them, 67.7% were married couples living together, 6.2% had a female householder with no husband present, and 24.2% were non-families. 21.6% of all households were made up of individuals, and 10.2% had someone living alone who was 65 years of age or older. The average household size was 2.70 and the average family size was 3.17.

In the village, the population was spread out, with 29.7% under the age of 18, 7.0% from 18 to 24, 28.2% from 25 to 44, 19.8% from 45 to 64, and 15.3% who were 65 years of age or older. The median age was 36 years. For every 100 females, there were 98.2 males. For every 100 females age 18 and over, there were 94.3 males.

The median income for a household in the village was $49,674, and the median income for a family was $55,781. Males had a median income of $42,112 versus $21,701 for females. The per capita income for the village was $20,658. About 3.0% of families and 2.4% of the population were below the poverty line, including 1.6% of those under age 18 and 5.9% of those age 65 or over.

== Education ==
The village is served by the Cedar Grove-Belgium School District, a district shared with Belgium, a village located to the south in Ozaukee County. Cedar Grove-Belgium High School is the local high school. The school mascot is a Rocket.

The Cedar Grove-Belgium School District made national headlines in April 2024 when the desired characteristics listed by the Board of Education in its official search for a new Superintendent of Schools cited "Christian Values" and "conservative politics" as those sought in a successful candidate. Questions were raised in many quarters about the legality of a "religious test" for the position in light of the provisions of the Civil Rights Act of 1964, as well as the propriety of insisting on specific political views. Subsequent to publication of the District's Search Document, a public meeting concerning the Search was abruptly cancelled.

== Arts and culture ==
Every year the town remembers its Dutch heritage with a two-day celebration, the Holland Fest, held in Memorial Park the last Friday and Saturday in July. The festival features ethnic foods, music, and 2-mile and 10K runs. Before the Saturday afternoon parade the main street is scrubbed by children and adults dressed in traditional Dutch costumes to prepare the road for the Klompen Dancers and parade to follow. Another nod to the village's Dutch roots is a full-sized replica windmill in Windmill Park downtown. In addition to Klompen Dancing, the festival also holds an annual wooden shoe race where children race one another while wearing traditional Dutch wooden shoes. The festival also is known for its Oliebollen, which is a type of Dutch doughnut. Holland Fest is one of the largest "dry festivals" in Wisconsin.

== Notable people ==
- David Claerbaut, author and educator, was raised in Cedar Grove.
- John Mentink, farmer, businessman, and politician, was born near Cedar Grove.
- Henry Ott, farmer, businessman, and politician, was born in Cedar Grove.
- Willis J. Potts, pediatric surgeon, was raised in Cedar Grove.
- Henry Walvoord, farmer and politician, lived in Cedar Grove.

== Images ==
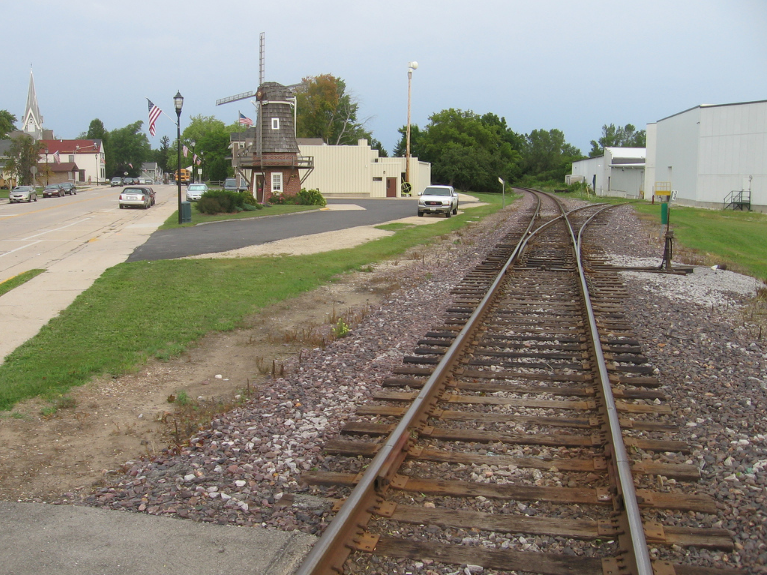
Cedar Grove's Windmill Park, with a working replica windmill celebrating the community's Dutch roots.

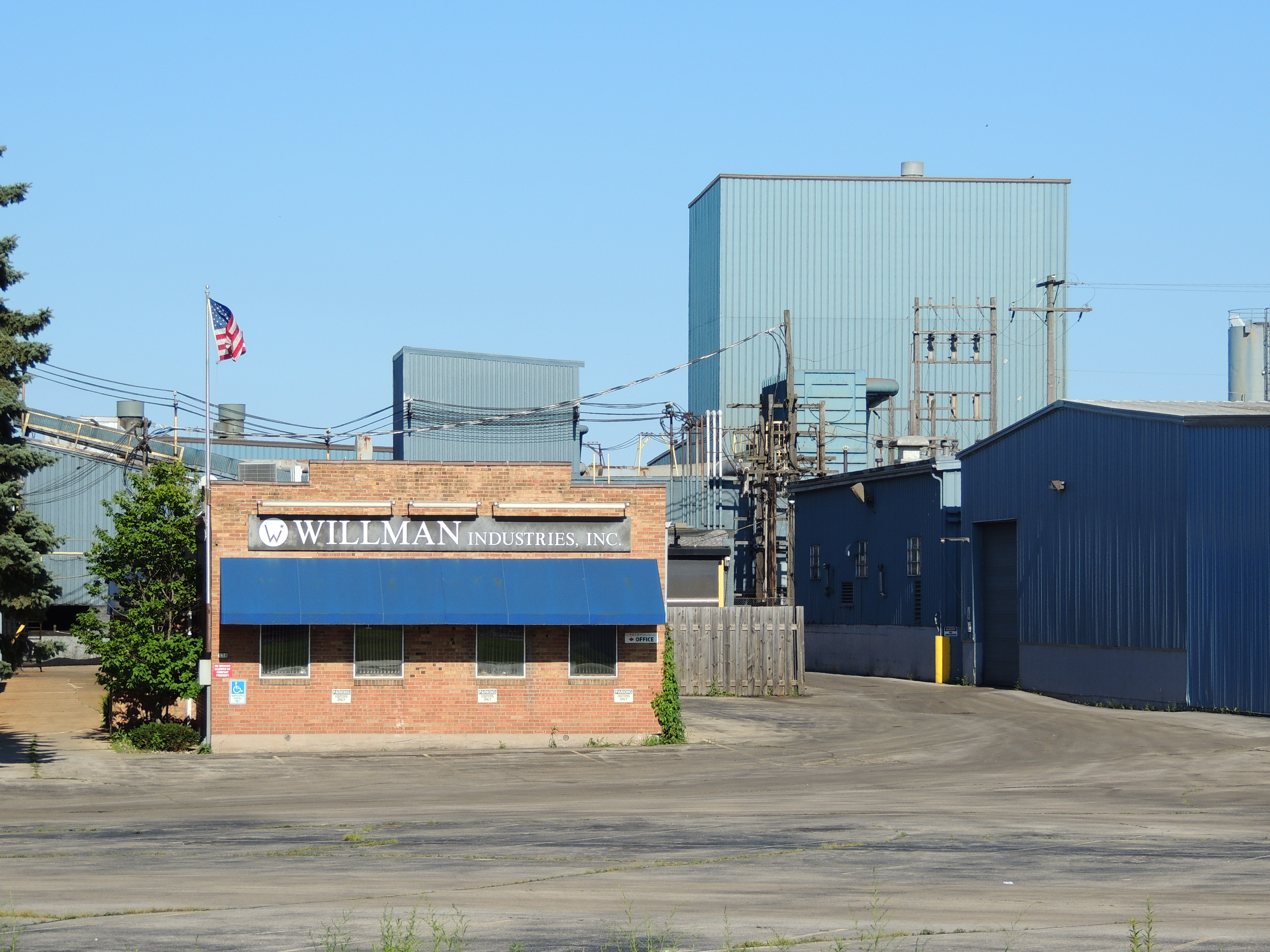
Willman Industries is one of the top employers in Cedar Grove, Wisconsin

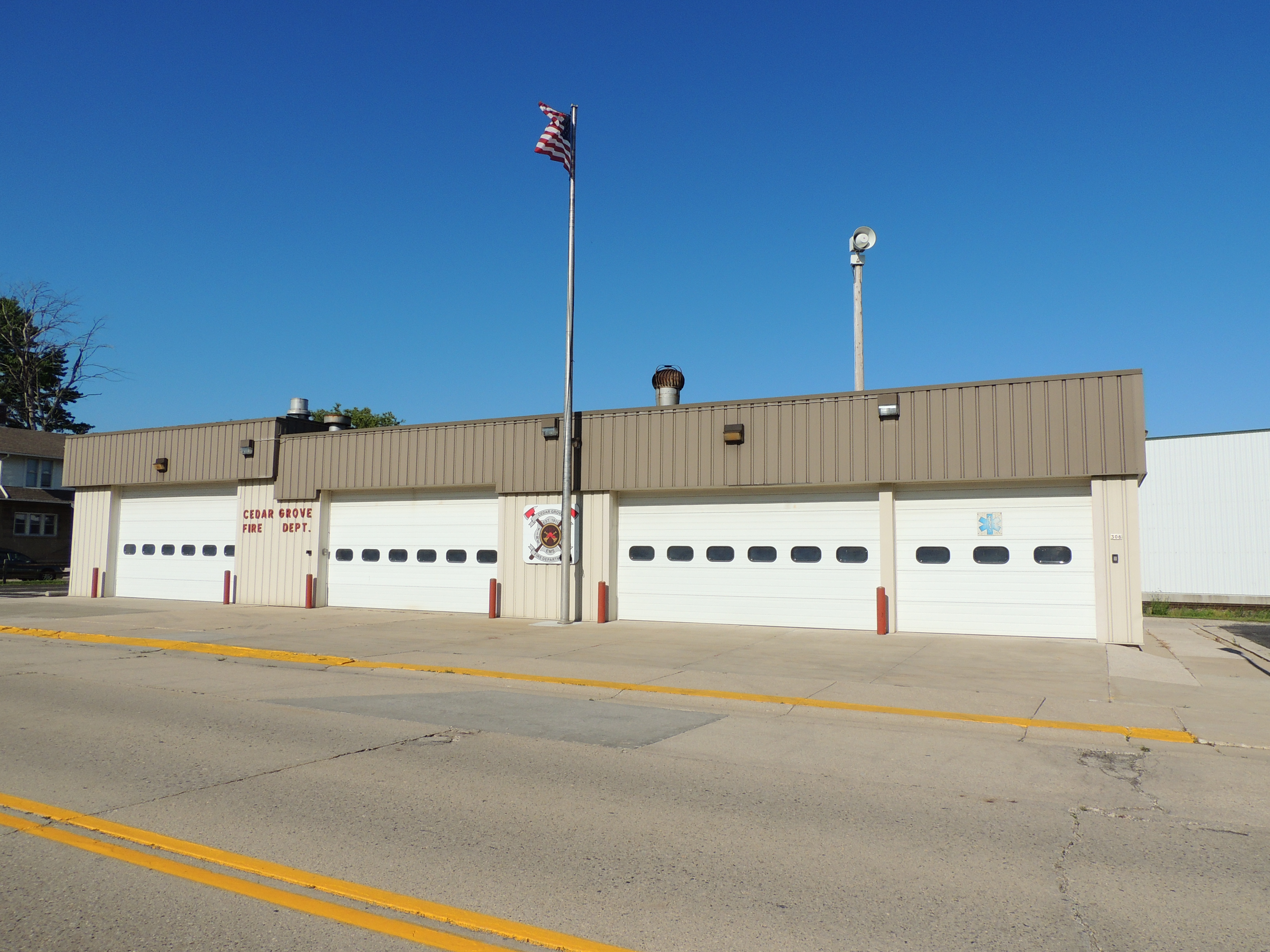
The Cedar Grove Fire Station is located on North Main Street.
