= Lake Church, Wisconsin =

Unincorporated community in Ozaukee County, Wisconsin

- Unincorporated community
- Location within Wisconsin Location within the United States
- Coordinates: 43°29′59″N 87°49′14″W
- Country: United States
- State: Wisconsin
- County: Ozaukee
- Elevation: 686 ft (209 m)
- Time zone: UTC-6 (Central (CST))
  - Summer (DST): UTC-5 (CDT)
- Area code: 262
- GNIS feature ID: 1567726

Lake Church is an unincorporated community located in the town of Belgium, Ozaukee County, Wisconsin, United States. Lake Church is east of Belgium and is near Interstate 43.

== History ==
A post office called Lake Church was established in 1894; it closed in 1907. The community took its name from St. Mary's of the Lake Church.

In 2021, the Wisconsin Shipwreck Coast National Marine Sanctuary was established in the waters of Lake Michigan off Lake Church.
