= Dacada, Wisconsin =

Unincorporated community in Ozaukee County, Wisconsin

- Unincorporated community
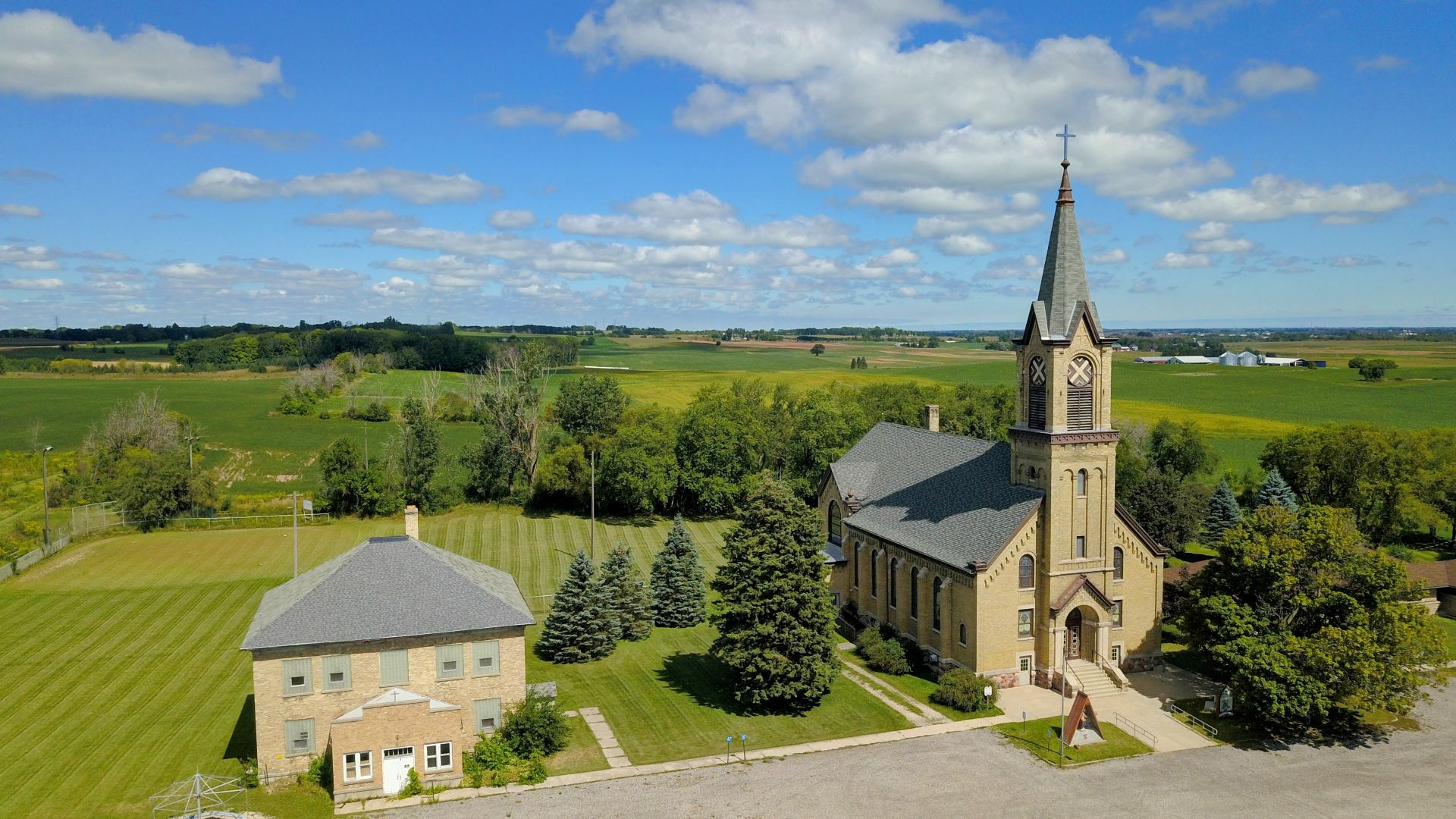
- St. Nicholas Chapel and School

- Location within Wisconsin Location within the United States
- Coordinates: 43°32′36″N 87°54′31″W
- Country: United States
- State: Wisconsin
- Counties: Ozaukee, Sheboygan
- Elevation: 833 ft (254 m)
- Time zone: UTC-6 (Central (CST))
  - Summer (DST): UTC-5 (CDT)
- Area code: 262
- GNIS feature ID: 1563654

Dacada is an unincorporated community located in the towns of Belgium and Holland in Ozaukee and Sheboygan counties, Wisconsin, United States. Dacada is east of Random Lake and northwest of Belgium.

Dacada was settled by immigrants from Luxembourg in the 1840s and 1850s. The name is derived from "Dakota." Early residents built a Catholic church, known as St. Nicholas, in 1849. The original church was a log cabin; it was soon replaced by a stone church in 1863, and again in 1911. The community is split between Sheboygan and Ozaukee counties. Local residents note that they were baptized in Sheboygan County (in St. Nicholas Church) and buried in Ozaukee (at the cemetery across the street).
