= Henry Walvoord =

American politician

Henry Walvoord (November 14, 1847 – August 9, 1909) was an American farmer and politician.

Born in Pittsburgh, Pennsylvania, Walvoord moved with his family to Cedar Grove, Sheboygan County, Wisconsin, in 1849. Walvoord was a dairy farmer and was in the pea canning business. He served on the town board and was chairman of the board. He also served on the Sheboygan County Board of Supervisors and was the county treasurer and register of deeds. In 1885, he served in the Wisconsin State Assembly as a Republican. In 1909, he died suddenly at his home in Cedar Grove, Wisconsin.
