= Nathaniel Farnsworth =

American politician

Nathaniel Farnsworth was a member of the Maine House of Representatives and the Wisconsin State Assembly. He was a member of the House of Representatives in 1848. Later, Farnsworth was a Republican member of the Assembly during the 1875 session. In addition, he was a candidate for the Wisconsin State Senate in 1863 and a member of the county board of Sheboygan County, Wisconsin. Farnsworth was born on January 20, 1820, in what is now known as Jonesboro, Maine.
