= Patrick Henry Smith =

American politician

Patrick Henry Smith (September 29, 1827 – January 22, 1884) was an American businessperson and politician.

Born in Royalton, Vermont, Smith moved to Sheboygan, Wisconsin Territory in 1847. He then settled permanently in Plymouth, Wisconsin in 1848 where he was a merchant. From 1853 to 1857, Smith served as postmaster of Plymouth, Wisconsin. In 1860, Smith was appointed deputy United States marshal. Smith was the first town clerk of Plymouth, Wisconsin and was a Democrat. He served on the Plymouth Common Council and was president of the common council. From 1880 to his death in 1884, Smith served in the Wisconsin State Senate. Smith died in Plymouth, Vermont from ill health.
