= Major Shaw =

American politician

Major Shaw (July 12, 1840 in Kent, New York – May 20, 1874) was a member of the Wisconsin State Assembly during the 1872 session. Previously, he had been elected as a town supervisor of Sherman, Sheboygan County, Wisconsin in 1869. He was a Republican. Shaw was born on July 12, 1840, in Kent, New York.
