= Träipen =

Luxembourgish blood sausage

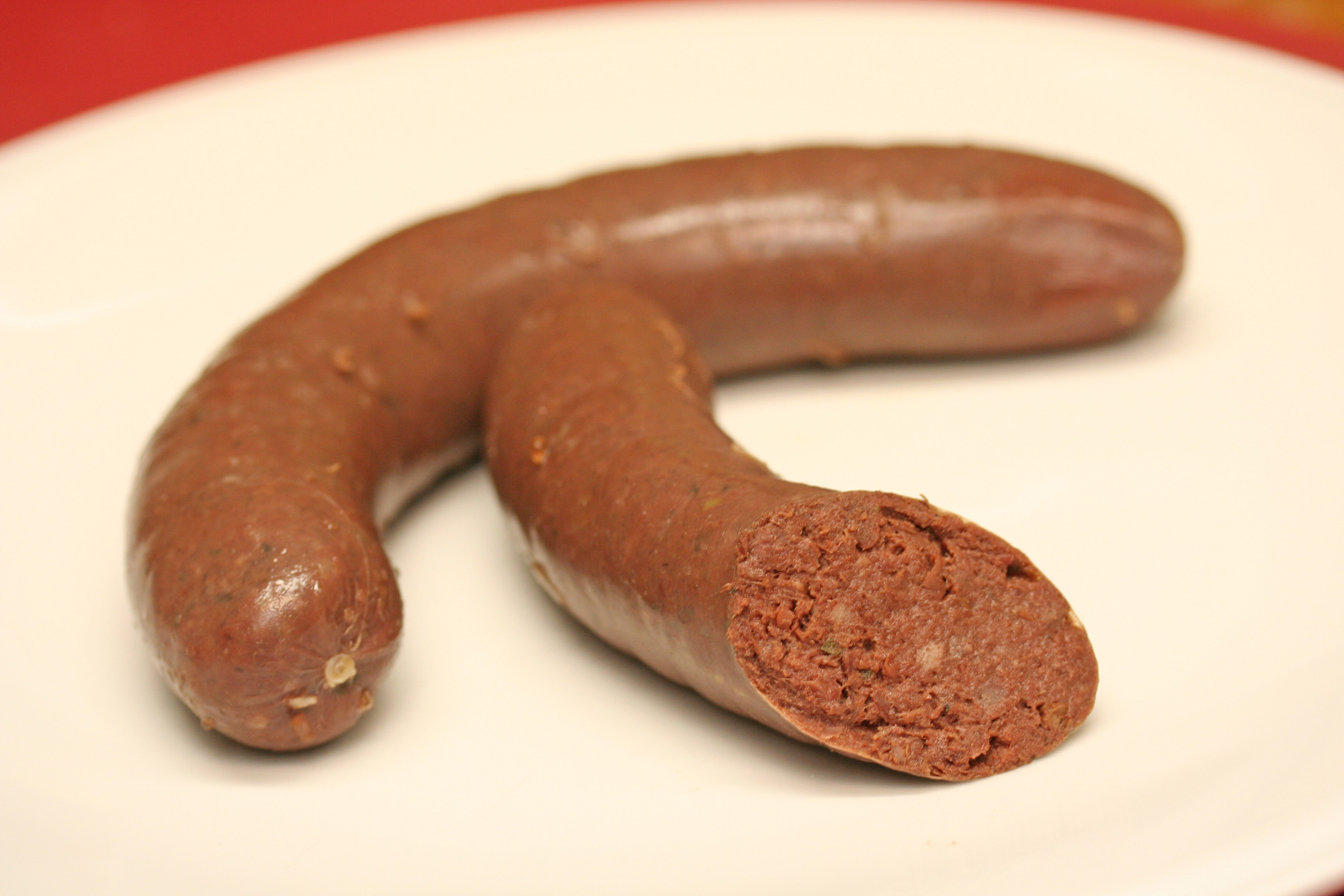
Träipen

Träipen, sometimes treipen, is the Luxembourg variant of blood sausage. The sausages are traditionally prepared from 1/3 hog's head (or offal and any other scraps of pork) and fat, 1/3 blood, and 1/3 (winter) vegetables (such as white cabbage and onions). Other ingredients include white bread and mostly regional spices, that always include savory, and a hint of caraway.

There are many variants to local recipes for its preparation but basically the meat and fat are boiled with salt, then minced and mixed with the finely ground vegetables. Fresh blood is added together with breadcrumbs and spices, and the mixture is put into larger intestine casings. The sausages are then boiled for 15 minutes in a large saucepan until cooked (when punctured, only clear liquid should emerge).

Träipen always have to be prepared by frying them in a frying pan, until crispy (intentionally bursting them is popular due to the added crispyness), and are usually served with boiled potatoes and apple sauce (”Himmel an Ärd“ - Heaven and earth), similar to recipes in the Cologne region.

Traditionally, they have been eaten after Midnight Mass on Christmas Eve, and are popular in the entire ”Träipenzäit“ (Träipen time) between All Saints’ Day and the Buergbrennen celebrations on the first Sunday in Lent.
