= Holland, Sheboygan County, Wisconsin =

Holland, Wisconsin
- Town
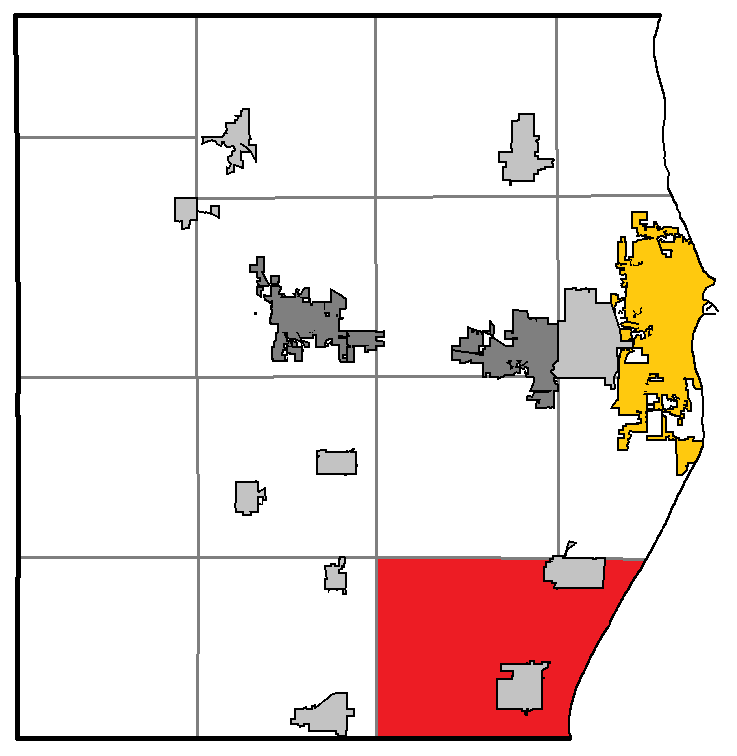
- Location of Holland, within Sheboygan County
- Coordinates: 43°35′19″N 87°50′20″W
- Country: United States
- State: Wisconsin
- County: Sheboygan

Area
  - Total: 40.9 sq mi (105.9 km^{2})
  - Land: 40.9 sq mi (105.9 km^{2})
  - Water: 0 sq mi (0.0 km^{2})
- Elevation: 720 ft (220 m)

Population (2020)
  - Total: 2,273
  - Density: 55.59/sq mi (21.46/km^{2})
- Time zone: UTC-6 (Central (CST))
  - Summer (DST): UTC-5 (CDT)
- Area code: 920
- FIPS code: 55-35375
- GNIS feature ID: 1583402
- Website: www.townofholland.com

Holland is a town in Sheboygan County, Wisconsin, United States. The population was listed as 2,273 in the 2020 census. It is included in the Sheboygan, Wisconsin Metropolitan Statistical Area. The unincorporated community of Idlewood Beach is located in the town. The unincorporated community of Dacada is also located partially in the town.

== Geography ==
According to the United States Census Bureau, the town has a total area of 40.9 square miles (105.9 km^{2}), of which 40.9 square miles (105.8 km^{2}) of it is land and 0.02% is water.

== Demographics ==
As of the census of 2000, there were 2,360 people, 828 households, and 693 families residing in the town. The population density was 57.8 people per square mile (22.3/km^{2}). There were 1,019 housing units at an average density of 24.9 per square mile (9.6/km^{2}). The racial makeup of the town was 98.43% White, 0.21% African American, 0.08% Asian, 0.08% from other races, and 1.19% from two or more races. Hispanic or Latino of any race were 0.68% of the population.

There were 828 households, out of which 36.2% had children under the age of 18 living with them, 76.4% were married couples living together, 3.6% had a female householder with no husband present, and 16.3% were non-families. 13.4% of all households were made up of individuals, and 5.4% had someone living alone who was 65 years of age or older. The average household size was 2.85 and the average family size was 3.15.

In the town, the population was spread out, with 27.2% under the age of 18, 6.7% from 18 to 24, 25.9% from 25 to 44, 29.6% from 45 to 64, and 10.6% who were 65 years of age or older. The median age was 40 years. For every 100 females, there were 101.4 males. For every 100 females age 18 and over, there were 104.2 males.

The median income for a household in the town was $57,419, and the median income for a family was $60,750. Males had a median income of $36,803 versus $28,152 for females. The per capita income for the town was $23,195. About 0.9% of families and 1.2% of the population were below the poverty line, including 0.9% of those under age 18 and 4.0% of those age 65 or over.

== Notable people ==
- Peter Daane, Wisconsin State Representative, merchant, and farmer, lived on a farm in the town; Daane served as chairman of the Holland Town Board
