= Oostburg, Wisconsin =

- Village
- Village of Oostburg
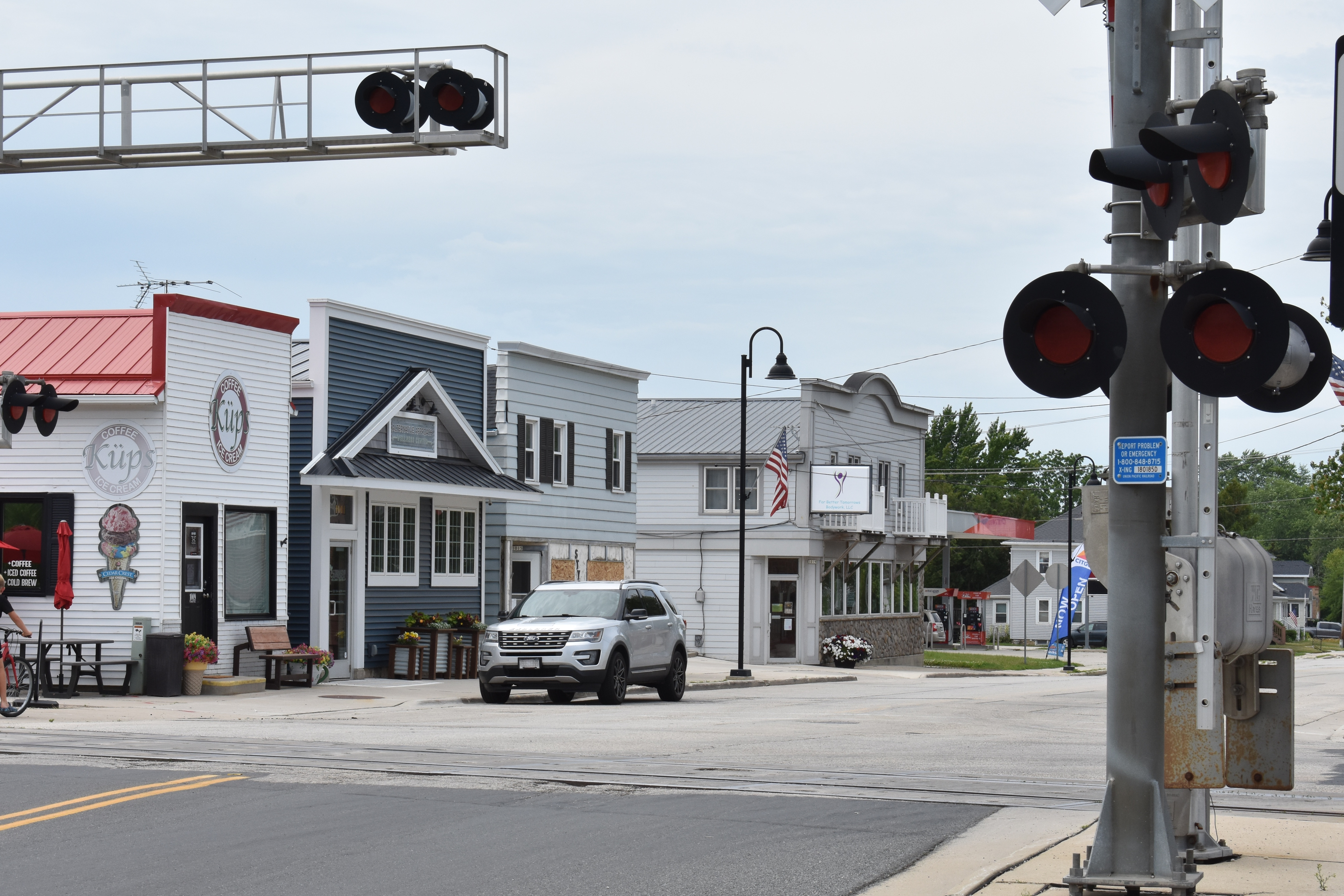
- Downtown Oostburg

- Location of Oostburg in Sheboygan County, Wisconsin.
- Coordinates: 43°37′27″N 87°47′52″W
- Country: United States
- State: Wisconsin
- County: Sheboygan

Government
  - President: Brian Hilbelink

Area
  - Total: 1.96 sq mi (5.08 km^{2})
  - Land: 1.96 sq mi (5.08 km^{2})
  - Water: 0 sq mi (0.00 km^{2})
- Elevation: 699 ft (213 m)

Population (2020)
  - Total: 3,056
  - Density: 1,542.8/sq mi (595.69/km^{2})
- Time zone: UTC-6 (Central (CST))
  - Summer (DST): UTC-5 (CDT)
- Area code: 920
- FIPS code: 55-60100
- GNIS feature ID: 1570842
- Website: oostburgwi.gov

Oostburg is a village in Sheboygan County, Wisconsin, United States. The population was 3,056 at the 2020 census. It is included in the Sheboygan, Wisconsin Metropolitan Statistical Area.

== History ==
The Village of Oostburg was incorporated in 1909. It was settled by primarily Dutch immigrants, and named after a city in the Netherlands.

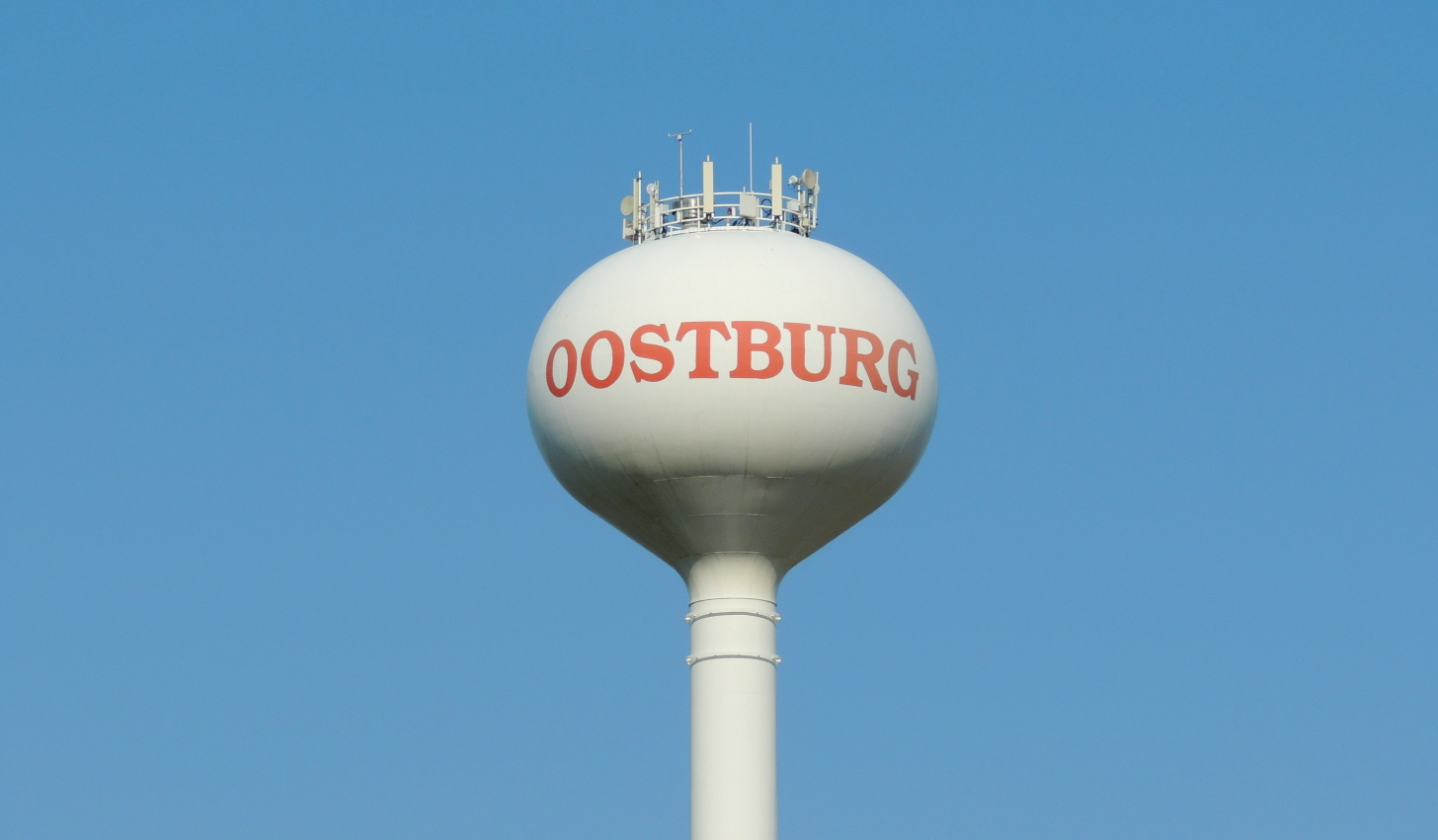
Oostburg Water Tower

== Education ==
The Oostburg School District operates the Oostburg Elementary School, Oostburg Middle School and the Oostburg High School. Oostburg Christian School is a private school located within the village.

== Geography ==
Oostburg is located at 43°37′27″N 87°47′52″W (43.624256, -87.797666).

According to the United States Census Bureau, the village has a total area of 1.95 square miles (5.05 km^{2}), all land.

== Demographics ==
Historical population
Census	Pop.	Note	%±
1910	380		—
1920	497		30.8%
1930	671		35.0%
1940	742		10.6%
1950	895		20.6%
1960	1,065		19.0%
1970	1,309		22.9%
1980	1,647		25.8%
1990	1,931		17.2%
2000	2,660		37.8%
2010	2,887		8.5%
2020	3,056		5.9%
U.S. Decennial Census

=== 2010 census ===
As of the census of 2010, there were 2,887 people, 1,091 households, and 826 families living in the village. The population density was 1,480.5 inhabitants per square mile (571.6/km^{2}). There were 1,154 housing units at an average density of 591.8 per square mile (228.5/km^{2}). The racial makeup of the village was 95.7% white, 0.7% African American, 0.3% Native American, 0.7% Asian, 1.8% from other races, and 0.8% from two or more races. Hispanic or Latino of any race were 3.3% of the population.

There were 1,091 households, of which 35.9% had children under the age of 18 living with them, 67.5% were married couples living together, 6.1% had a female householder with no husband present, 2.1% had a male householder with no wife present, and 24.3% were non-families. 21.9% of all households were made up of individuals, and 10.8% had someone living alone who was 65 years of age or older. The average household size was 2.64 and the average family size was 3.10.

The median age in the village was 38.3 years. 27.9% of residents were under the age of 18; 6.2% were between the ages of 18 and 24; 25.2% were from 25 to 44; 25% were from 45 to 64; and 15.5% were 65 years of age or older. The gender makeup of the village was 49.9% male and 50.1% female.

=== 2000 census ===
As of the census of 2000, there were 2,660 people, 980 households, and 761 families living in the village. The population density was 1,416.2 people per square mile (546.3/km^{2}). There were 996 housing units at an average density of 530.3 per square mile (204.6/km^{2}). The racial makeup of the village was 99.10% white, 0.15% African American, 0.08% Native American, 0.30% Asian, 0.15% from other races, and 0.23% from two or more races. Hispanic or Latino of any race were 1.24% of the population.

There were 980 households, out of which 38.3% had children under the age of 18 living with them, 71.4% were married couples living together, 4.8% had a female householder with no husband present, and 22.3% were non-families. 20.0% of all households were made up of individuals, and 10.5% had someone living alone who was 65 years of age or older. The average household size was 2.71 and the average family size was 3.14.

In the village, the population was spread out, with 29.6% under the age of 18, 7.3% from 18 to 24, 29.9% from 25 to 44, 18.1% from 45 to 64, and 15.2% who were 65 years of age or older. The median age was 34 years. For every 100 females, there were 100.0 males. For every 100 females age 18 and over, there were 95.3 males.

The median income for a household in the village was $47,469, and the median income for a family was $58,654. Males had a median income of $40,975 versus $25,478 for females. The per capita income for the village was $19,958. None of the families and 0.8% of the population were living below the poverty line, including no under eighteens and 1.7% of those over 64.

== Notable people ==
- Peter Daane, farmer, merchant, and politician, lived in Oostburg
- Devin LeMahieu, newspaper editor and politician, lived in Oostburg
- Terry Katsma, businessman and politician, lives in Oostburg
