= Ozaukee County, Wisconsin =

County in Wisconsin, United States

- County
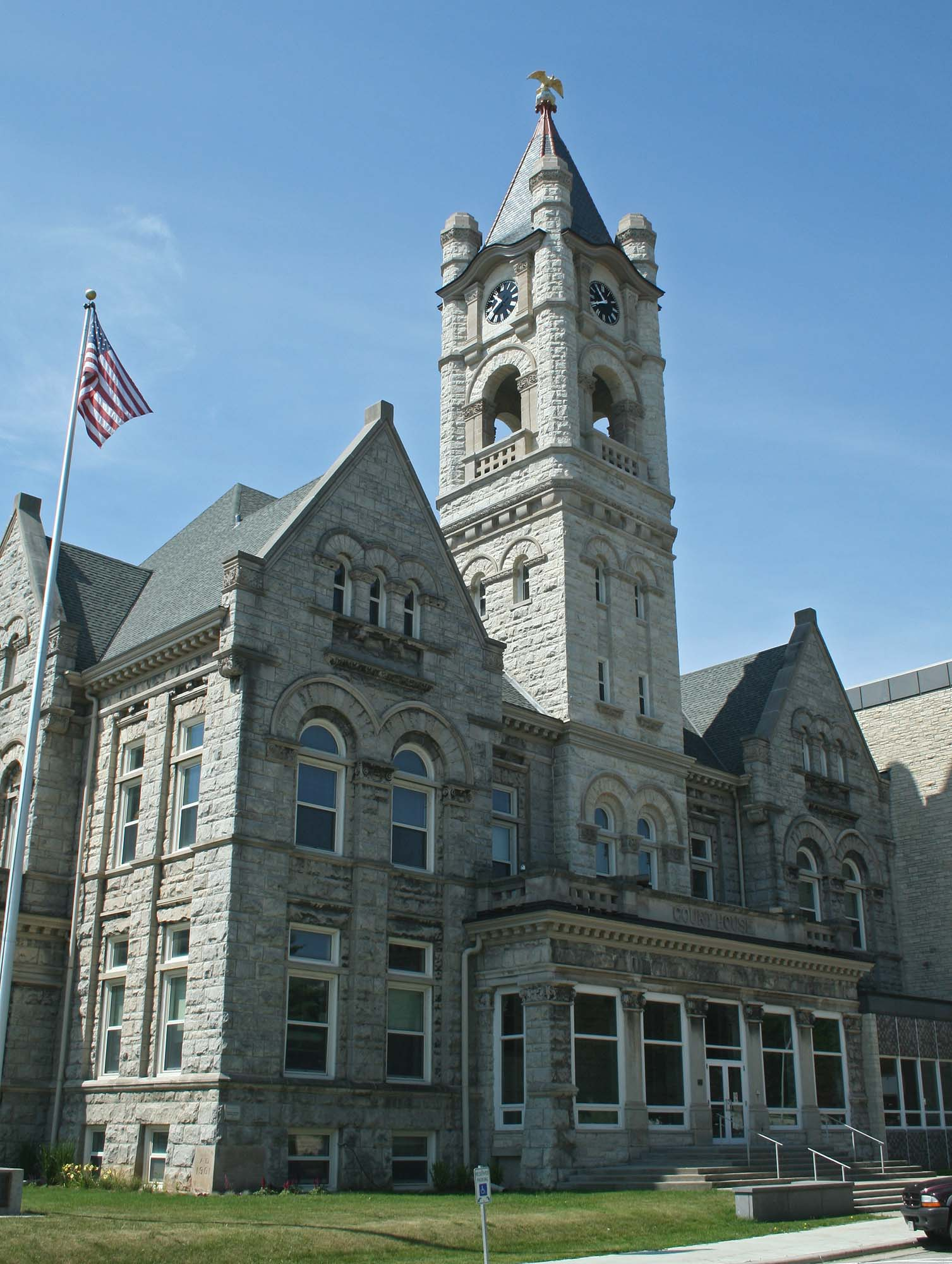
- Ozaukee County Courthouse in July 2009

- Location within the U.S. state of Wisconsin
- Coordinates: 43°23′55″N 87°53′37″W
- Country: United States
- State: Wisconsin
- Founded: 1853
- Seat: Port Washington
- Largest city: Mequon

Area
  - Total: 1,116.2 sq mi (2,891 km^{2})
  - Land: 233.08 sq mi (603.7 km^{2})
  - Water: 883.12 sq mi (2,287.3 km^{2})

Population (2020)
  - Total: 91,503
  - Estimate (2025): 94,346 ▲
  - Density: 392.7/sq mi (151.6/km^{2})
- Time zone: UTC−6 (Central)
  - Summer (DST): UTC−5 (CDT)
- Congressional district: 6th
- Website: ozaukeecounty.gov

Ozaukee County is a county in the U.S. state of Wisconsin. As of the 2020 census, the population was 91,503. Its county seat is Port Washington. Ozaukee County is included in the Milwaukee metropolitan area.

As of the 2000 Census, Ozaukee County had the second-lowest poverty rate of any county in the United States, at 2.6%. In terms of per capita income, it is the 25th-wealthiest county in the country.

== Toponymy ==
"Ozaukee" comes from the Ojibwe name for the Sauk people. It probably means "people living at the mouth of a river."

== History ==
=== Precolonial ===
The Hilgen Spring Mound Site is one of the oldest-known sites of human habitation of Ozaukee County. Located near Cedar Creek in the eastern part of the City of Cedarburg, the site consists of three conical burial mounds constructed by early Woodland period Mound Builders. In 1968, archaeologists from the Milwaukee Public Museum found human burials and artifacts, including stone altars, arrowheads, and pottery shards, during an excavation of one of the mounds. Radiocarbon samples from the excavation date the mounds' construction to approximately 480 BCE, making it one of the oldest mound groups in the state.

In the mid-1800s, Increase A. Lapham identified a group of circular mounds in the Saukville area and found a stone ax. In his writing, Lapham did not speculate about the age of the artifact or the mounds. An additional artifact of the early Native American presence in the Saukville area is the Ozaukee County Birdstone, discovered by a six-year-old farm boy in 1891. While the exact age of the Ozaukee County Birdstone remains uncertain, many birdstones date from a period ranging from 3000 BCE to 500 BCE.

=== 19th century ===
In the early 19th century, the Native Americans living in Ozaukee County included the Menominee, Potawatomi, and Sauk people. There were numerous Native American villages in the county along the Milwaukee River and its tributaries. The Menominee surrendered their claims to the land east of the Milwaukee River to the United States Federal Government in 1832 through the Treaty of Washington. The Potawatomi surrendered their claims to the land west of the river in 1833 through the 1833 Treaty of Chicago, which (after being ratified in 1835) required them to leave the area by 1838. While many Potawatomi people moved west of the Mississippi River to Kansas, some chose to remain in Wisconsin, and were known as "strolling Potawatomi" because they were migrant squatters. Eventually the Potawatomi who evaded forced removal gathered in northern Wisconsin, where they formed the Forest County Potawatomi Community.

The first whites in the area were primarily New England land speculators, who began purchasing land from the government in 1835 at the price of $1.25 per acre. One of these land speculators was Wooster Harrison, who settled the land that would become Port Washington in 1835, which he originally named "Wisconsin City." At the time, the land was part of Washington County, and there were proposals that Port Washington become the county seat. However, Port Washington was far from the county's other early settlements, including Mequon, Grafton and Germantown. In 1850, the Wisconsin legislature bisected Washington County into northern and southern counties, with Port Washington as the northern seat and Cedarburg as the southern. County residents failed to ratify the bill, and in 1853 the legislature instead bisected the county into eastern and western sections, creating Ozaukee County. Port Washington became the seat of the new county, and the Washington County seat moved to West Bend.

In the 1840s, German, Irish, and Luxembourger immigrants began settling in the county. Germans were the largest ethnic group in and 19th century Ozaukee County, with seven in eight residents being of German descent according to the 1870 census. The earliest settlements formed around grist- and sawmills located on the county's waterways. Cedarburg, Grafton, Hamilton, Newburg, Saukville, and Thiensville all had mills by end of the 1840s. In the 19th and early 20th centuries, the county economy was primarily based on agriculture.

The beginning of the American Civil War saw some chaos in Ozaukee County. The county was one of the areas affected by Wisconsin's "Great Indian Scare" of September 1862, in which some residents panicked because of unfounded rumors of a Native American uprising in the state. The panic was exacerbated by the fact that 30,000 Wisconsinites were away, serving in the war, so residents may have felt especially vulnerable. Some residents fled their homes for Milwaukee, while others holed up in makeshift fortresses, as happened at the Cedarburg Mill. Several months after the panic, the United States Congress implemented the draft, which was unpopular among German immigrants with bad memories of mandatory conscription in their homelands. On November 10, 1862, several hundred Port Washington residents marched on the courthouse, attacked the official in charge of implementing the draft, burned draft records, and vandalized the homes of Union supporters. The riot ended when eight detachments of Union troops from Milwaukee were deployed.

In the 1870s the Milwaukee & Northern Railway was constructed to connect Milwaukee and northern Wisconsin including Green Bay, along its route it reached many communities in the center of the county including Thiensville, Cedarburg, Grafton and Saukville. Around the same time the Milwaukee, Lake Shore and Western Railway constructed its railway on the eastern edge of the county along Lake Michigan, also to connect Milwaukee and Northern Wisconsin. It reached fewer communities compared to the M&N line, only serving Port Washington. Regardless the railroads spurred development in Ozaukee County by providing efficient freight and passenger transportation.

=== 20th century ===
From 1908 to 1940, the Milwaukee Electric Railway and Light Company (TMERL) provided electric interurban passenger and freight service from Sheboygan to Milwaukee with stops at Belgium, Port Washington, Grafton, Cedarburg, Thiensville, Mequon, and other villages as well as major road crossings within Ozaukee County. The interurban cars ran approximately once per hour and delivered Ozaukee County agricultural products, such as milk and meat, to Milwaukee grocers and butchers. In 1940, the interurban ceased servicing Sheboygan due to declining ridership. Port Washington became the line's new northern terminus before the Ozaukee County line ceased operation in 1948.

Ozaukee County's communities experienced significant population growth during the suburbanization that followed World War II. Between 1940 and 1980, the population more than tripled, from 18,985 to 66,981. Although the interurban to Milwaukee declined service and finally ceased operation after the war, the construction of Interstate 43 in the mid-1960s allowed more residents to commute long distances to jobs and this encouraged residential home construction. Communities that experienced the most significant population growth, such as Cedarburg and Grafton, began to annex agricultural land for residential subdivisions and retail commercial development. The previously rural Town of Mequon became increasingly suburban and incorporated in 1957 as the City of Mequon. Today, it is the largest and most populous city in Ozaukee County.

=== 21st century ===
The Wisconsin Shipwreck Coast National Marine Sanctuary was established in 2021 in the waters of Lake Michigan, with its southern portion lying off roughly the northern half of Ozaukee County′s coastline. The national marine sanctuary is the site of a large number of historically significant shipwrecks.

== Geography ==
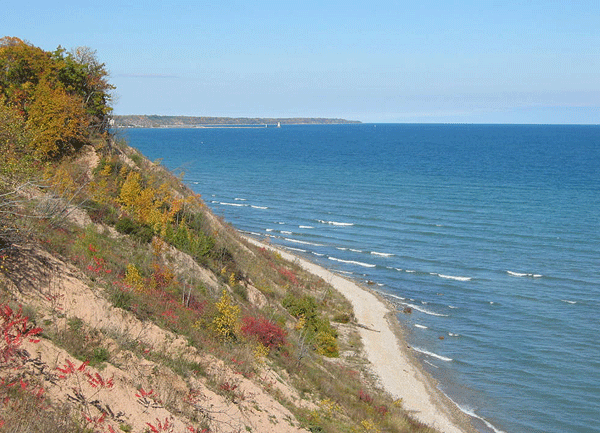
Lake Michigan shoreline, south of Port Washington

Ozaukee County covers 233 square miles of land, making it the second smallest county in Wisconsin by land area after Pepin County. The county's jurisdiction also extends over 883 square miles of water, most of which is in Lake Michigan.

Lion's Den Gorge Nature Preserve is a large bluffland and wetland county protected area on the shore of Lake Michigan.

=== Major highways ===
- Interstate 43
- Highway 32 (Wisconsin)
- Highway 33 (Wisconsin)
- Highway 57 (Wisconsin)
- Highway 60 (Wisconsin)
- Highway 167 (Wisconsin)
- Highway 181 (Wisconsin)

=== Adjacent counties ===
- Sheboygan County – north
- Oceana County, Michigan – northeast
- Muskegon County, Michigan – east
- Milwaukee County – south
- Waukesha County – southwest
- Washington County – west
- Ottawa County, Michigan – southeast

== Infrastructure ==
=== Railroads ===
- Union Pacific
- Wisconsin and Southern Railroad

=== Buses ===
- Milwaukee County Transit System

== Demographics ==
Historical population
Census	Pop.	Note	%±
1860	15,682		—
1870	15,564		−0.8%
1880	15,461		−0.7%
1890	14,943		−3.4%
1900	16,363		9.5%
1910	17,123		4.6%
1920	16,335		−4.6%
1930	17,394		6.5%
1940	18,985		9.1%
1950	23,361		23.0%
1960	38,441		64.6%
1970	54,421		41.6%
1980	66,981		23.1%
1990	72,831		8.7%
2000	82,317		13.0%
2010	86,395		5.0%
2020	91,503		5.9%
2025 (est.)	94,346	▲	3.1%
U.S. Decennial Census; 1790–1960 1900–1990; 1990–2000 2010 2020

=== Racial and ethnic composition ===
Ozaukee County, Wisconsin – Racial and ethnic composition Note: the US Census treats Hispanic/Latino as an ethnic category. This table excludes Latinos from the racial categories and assigns them to a separate category. Hispanics/Latinos may be of any race.
Race / ethnicity (NH = Non-Hispanic)	Pop 1980	Pop 1990	Pop 2000	Pop 2010	Pop 2020	% 1980	% 1990	% 2000	% 2010	% 2020
White alone (NH)	65,627	71,274	78,894	80,689	81,410	97.98%	97.86%	95.84%	93.40%	88.97%
Black or African American alone (NH)	438	485	759	1,144	1,483	0.65%	0.67%	0.92%	1.32%	1.62%
Native American or Alaska Native alone (NH)	95	116	148	174	167	0.14%	0.16%	0.18%	0.20%	0.18%
Asian alone (NH)	249	432	880	1,505	2,283	0.37%	0.59%	1.07%	1.74%	2.50%
Native Hawaiian or Pacific Islander alone (NH)	x	x	11	20	14	x	x	0.01%	0.02%	0.02%
Other race alone (NH)	42	7	49	54	343	0.06%	0.01%	0.06%	0.06%	0.37%
Mixed race or Multiracial (NH)	x	x	503	853	2,705	x	x	0.61%	0.99%	2.96%
Hispanic or Latino (any race)	530	517	1,073	1,956	3,098	0.79%	0.71%	1.30%	2.26%	3.39%
Total	66,981	72,831	82,317	86,395	91,503	100.00%	100.00%	100.00%	100.00%	100.00%

=== 2020 census ===
As of the 2020 census, the county had a population of 91,503 and the population density was 392.7 people per square mile (151.6 people/km^{2}). There were 39,086 housing units at an average density of 167.7 units per square mile (64.7 units/km^{2}).

The median age was 44.5 years. 21.5% of residents were under the age of 18 and 21.0% of residents were 65 years of age or older. For every 100 females there were 95.4 males, and for every 100 females age 18 and over there were 92.7 males age 18 and over.

There were 37,015 households in the county, of which 28.1% had children under the age of 18 living in them. Of all households, 57.9% were married-couple households, 14.6% were households with a male householder and no spouse or partner present, and 22.7% were households with a female householder and no spouse or partner present. About 27.1% of all households were made up of individuals and 13.7% had someone living alone who was 65 years of age or older. Of the 39,086 housing units, 5.3% were vacant, and among occupied units 75.6% were owner-occupied and 24.4% were renter-occupied; the homeowner vacancy rate was 0.8% and the rental vacancy rate was 6.8%.

The racial makeup of the county was 89.9% White, 1.7% Black or African American, 0.3% American Indian and Alaska Native, 2.5% Asian, <0.1% Native Hawaiian and Pacific Islander, 1.1% from some other race, and 4.6% from two or more races. Hispanic or Latino residents of any race comprised 3.4% of the population.

75.7% of residents lived in urban areas, while 24.3% lived in rural areas.

2000 Census Age Pyramid for Ozaukee County

=== 2000 census ===
As of the census of 2000, there were 82,317 people, 30,857 households, and 23,019 families residing in the county. The population density was 355 people per square mile (137 people/km^{2}). There were 32,034 housing units at an average density of 138 units per square mile (53 units/km^{2}). The racial makeup of the county was 96.72% White, 0.93% Black or African American, 0.20% Native American, 1.07% Asian, 0.02% Pacific Islander, 0.34% from other races, and 0.73% from two or more races. 1.30% of the population were Hispanic or Latino of any race. 47.2% were of German, 7.3% Irish and 6.7% Polish ancestry. 95.1% spoke English, 1.6% Spanish and 1.4% German as their first language.

There were 30,857 households, out of which 36.00% had children under the age of 18 living with them, 65.60% were married couples living together, 6.50% had a female householder with no husband present, and 25.40% were non-families. 21.40% of all households were made up of individuals, and 8.40% had someone living alone who was 65 years of age or older. The average household size was 2.61 and the average family size was 3.07.

In the county, the population was spread out, with 26.60% under the age of 18, 6.80% from 18 to 24, 28.00% from 25 to 44, 25.90% from 45 to 64, and 12.60% who were 65 years of age or older. The median age was 39 years. For every 100 females there were 97.30 males. For every 100 females age 18 and over, there were 94 males.

The median income for a household in the county was $62,745, and the median income for a family was $72,547 (these figures had risen to $73,197 and $88,231 respectively as of a 2007 estimate). Males had a median income of $50,044 versus $30,476 for females. The per capita income for the county was $31,947. About 1.7% of families and 2.6% of the population were below the poverty line, including 2.6% of those under age 18 and 4.1% of those age 65 or over.

=== Religious statistics ===
The Association of Religion Data Archives reported that as of 2010, the largest religious group in Ozaukee County is the Roman Catholic Archdiocese of Milwaukee, with 28,644 adherents spread across eight parishes. Although the number of Catholics in the county is around the same as it was in 1990, the number of parishes has declined from twelve in 1990 to eight in 2010, because of the mergers of small, rural and local parishes into larger, multi-campus parishes, such as the St. John XXIII Congregation in Port Washington and Saukville, which formed from the merger of three parishes and holds services in three church buildings. Other large religious groups in the county include 8,464 Missouri Synod Lutherans with seven congregations, 5,094 ELCA Lutherans with ten congregations, 2,702 Wisconsin Synod Lutherans with seven congregations, 1,795 adherents of the Presbyterian Church (USA) with one congregation, 1,558 adherents of the United Church of Christ with three congregations, 1,154 UMC Methodists with three congregations, 1,061 adherents of the evangelical Christian and Missionary Alliance with two congregations, 794 non-denominational Christians with four congregations, and 695 adherents of Orthodox and Reconstructionist Judaism with three synagogues, as well as other congregations in the Baháʼí, Christian Scientist, evangelical Protestant, Greek Orthodox, Hindu, Jehovah's Witnesses, Latter-day Saints, mainline Protestant, and Unitarian Universalist traditions.

== Transportation ==
Ozaukee County has a harbor in Port Washington on Lake Michigan, though not in the lakeside communities of Mequon or Grafton due to high bluffs along the lakeshore.

The Ozaukee County Interurban Trail is a multimodal trail for pedestrians and non-motorized vehicles. It runs through Grafton and connects to Sheboygan County and Brown Deer Trails via the old Milwaukee-Sheboygan Passenger Rail line.

Public transit was formerly provided by a commuter express bus (Route 143) to Milwaukee with stops in Port Washington, Saukville, Grafton, and Mequon. The bus operated Monday through Fridays excluding holidays, and was run jointly by Milwaukee and Ozaukee County. In 2024 the Ozaukee County board elected to discontinue the transit line to Milwaukee without replacement leaving Ozaukee County with no public transit connection to Milwaukee and no fixed route transit service within the county. The last day of service was June 28, 2024.

== Politics ==
United States presidential election results for Ozaukee County, Wisconsin
Year	Republican		Democratic		Third party(ies)	
Year	No.	%	No.	%	No.	%
1892	652	23.26%	2,094	74.71%	57	2.03%
1896	1,535	42.79%	1,947	54.28%	105	2.93%
1900	1,280	38.42%	1,992	59.78%	60	1.80%
1904	1,492	47.52%	1,501	47.80%	147	4.68%
1908	1,216	38.48%	1,856	58.73%	88	2.78%
1912	749	25.24%	1,878	63.27%	341	11.49%
1916	1,610	49.42%	1,577	48.40%	71	2.18%
1920	3,523	75.60%	835	17.92%	302	6.48%
1924	1,015	20.71%	592	12.08%	3,293	67.20%
1928	2,338	37.16%	3,864	61.41%	90	1.43%
1932	1,182	16.51%	5,770	80.59%	208	2.91%
1936	1,785	22.54%	5,594	70.65%	539	6.81%
1940	4,913	56.32%	3,662	41.98%	148	1.70%
1944	5,655	60.66%	3,579	38.39%	89	0.95%
1948	4,866	52.85%	4,159	45.17%	183	1.99%
1952	8,665	66.97%	4,241	32.78%	33	0.26%
1956	9,808	69.63%	4,139	29.38%	139	0.99%
1960	10,401	58.91%	7,228	40.94%	28	0.16%
1964	8,581	47.35%	9,517	52.51%	25	0.14%
1968	12,155	58.11%	7,246	34.64%	1,518	7.26%
1972	15,759	61.88%	8,503	33.39%	1,204	4.73%
1976	19,817	62.17%	11,271	35.36%	789	2.48%
1980	21,371	61.00%	10,779	30.77%	2,883	8.23%
1984	23,898	68.48%	10,765	30.85%	233	0.67%
1988	22,899	63.94%	12,661	35.35%	252	0.70%
1992	22,805	53.15%	11,879	27.68%	8,226	19.17%
1996	22,078	56.67%	13,269	34.06%	3,614	9.28%
2000	31,155	65.24%	15,030	31.48%	1,566	3.28%
2004	34,904	65.82%	17,714	33.40%	414	0.78%
2008	32,172	60.29%	20,579	38.56%	614	1.15%
2012	36,077	64.63%	19,159	34.32%	581	1.04%
2016	30,464	55.84%	20,170	36.97%	3,926	7.20%
2020	33,912	55.15%	26,517	43.13%	1,057	1.72%
2024	34,504	54.36%	27,874	43.92%	1,094	1.72%

As one of the suburban “WOW” counties surrounding Milwaukee, Ozaukee County is a Republican stronghold in U.S. presidential elections, having voted Republican in all elections (except one) since 1940. Lyndon B. Johnson was the last Democrat to carry the county in a presidential election, in 1964. Following similar suburban trends across the nation, the county has grown more Democratic in recent years, but is still a Republican stronghold. Before WWI, however, Ozaukee County was reliably Democratic, due to its high German Catholic population.

In 2020, Joe Biden became the first Democrat to win over 40% of the vote since 1964. Biden also won the municipality of Cedarburg, the first time a Democrat has won a municipality in any of the WOW Counties since 1996. Progressive judge Janet Protasiewicz received nearly 48% of the vote in Ozaukee in the 2023 Wisconsin Supreme Court election. Judge Susan M. Crawford was also able to win 48% in 2025.

In 2024, despite losing the state to Donald Trump, Democrat Kamala Harris won 43.92% of the vote in Ozaukee in the 2024 United States presidential election, the highest percentage won by a Democratic presidential nominee since 1964.

== Communities ==
=== Cities ===
- Cedarburg
- Mequon
- Port Washington (county seat)

=== Villages ===
- Bayside (mostly in Milwaukee County)
- Belgium
- Fredonia
- Grafton
- Newburg (mostly in Washington County)
- Saukville
- Thiensville

=== Towns ===
- Belgium
- Cedarburg
- Fredonia
- Grafton
- Port Washington
- Saukville

=== Census-designated place ===
- Waubeka

=== Unincorporated communities ===
- Dacada (partial)
- Decker
- Decker Corner
- Druecker
- Hamilton
- Holy Cross
- Horns Corners
- Knellsville
- Lake Church
- Lakefield
- Little Kohler
- Sauk Trail Beach
- Ulao

=== Ghost town ===
- Stonehaven

== Education ==
=== School districts ===
- Cedar Grove-Belgium Area School District
- Cedarburg School District
- Grafton School District
- Mequon-Thiensville School District
- Northern Ozaukee School District
- Port Washington-Saukville School District
- Random Lake School District

=== High schools ===
- Cedarburg High School
- Grafton High School
- Homestead High School (Mequon-Thiensville)
- Ozaukee High School (Fredonia)
- Port Washington High School

== See also ==
- National Register of Historic Places listings in Ozaukee County, Wisconsin
