= Wisconsin's 23rd Assembly district =

American legislative district in Ozaukee County and Milwaukee County, Wisconsin

Wisconsin's 23rd State Assembly district
- 2024 map defined in 2023 Wisc. Act 94; 2022 map defined in Johnson v. Wisconsin Elections Commission; 2011 map was defined in 2011 Wisc. Act 43
Assemblymember
| Deb Andraca; D–Whitefish Bay |
since January 4, 2021 (5 years)
- Demographics: 79.09% White; 10.27% Black; 3.44% Hispanic; 5.56% Asian; 0.85% Native American; 0.11% Hawaiian/Pacific Islander
- Population (2020) • Voting age: 59,097; 45,756
- Website: Official website
- Notes: Milwaukee metro area (northeast)

The 23rd Assembly district of Wisconsin is one of 99 districts in the Wisconsin State Assembly. Located in southeastern Wisconsin, the district comprises parts of northeast Milwaukee County and southeast Ozaukee County. It includes the villages of Bayside, Fox Point, River Hills, Thiensville, and Whitefish Bay, and most of the village of Brown Deer and the eastern half of the city of Mequon. The district is represented by Democrat Deb Andraca, since January 2021. As currently drawn, the district is the wealthiest state assembly district in the state.

The 23rd Assembly district is located within Wisconsin's 8th Senate district, along with the 22nd and 24th Assembly districts.

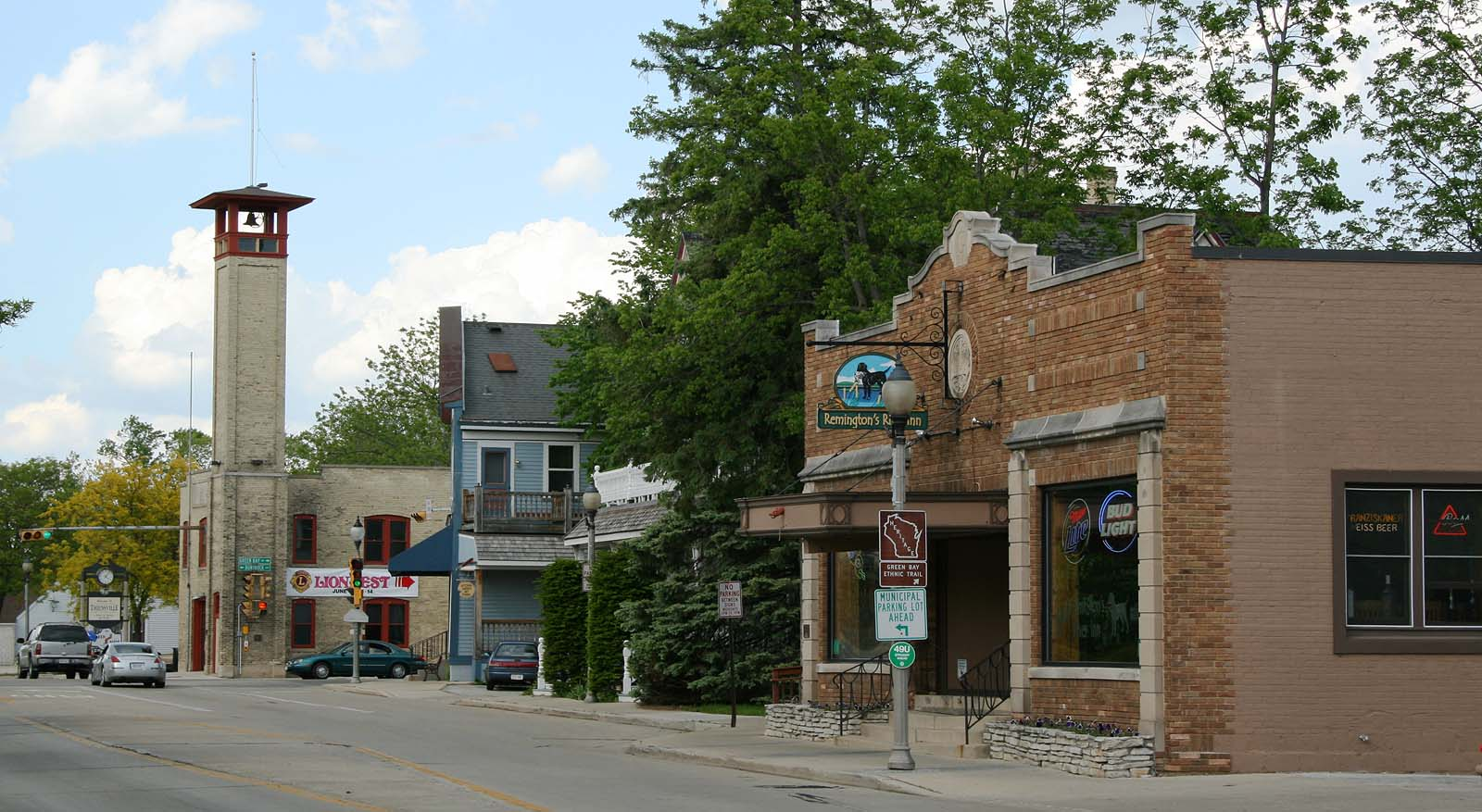
Main Street Historic District (Thiensville, Wisconsin)

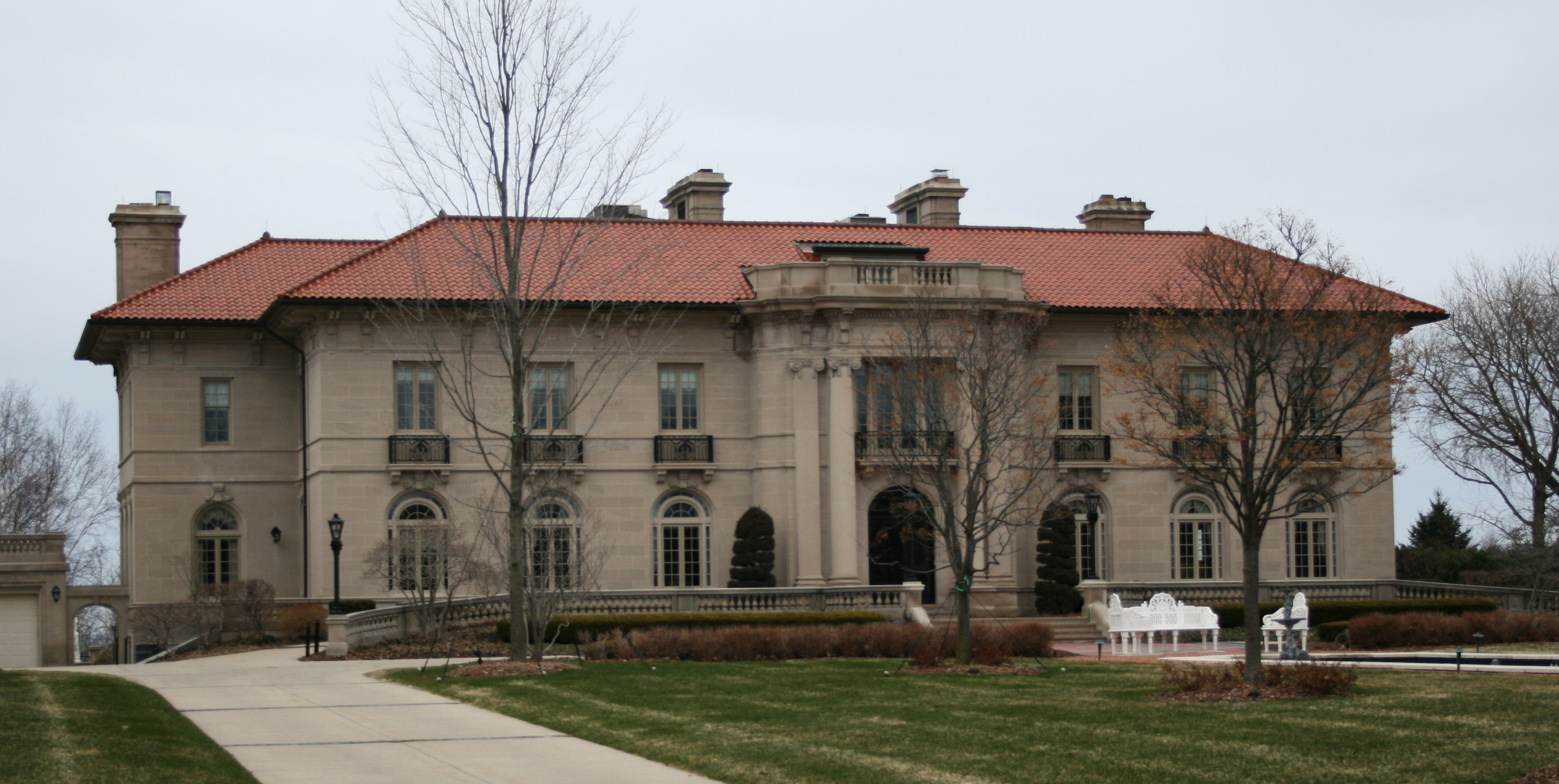
Herman Uihlein House in Whitefish Bay

== List of past representatives ==
List of representatives to the Wisconsin State Assembly from the 23rd district
| Member | Party | Residence | Counties represented | Term start | Term end | Ref. |
|---|---|---|---|---|---|---|
District created
| Thomas A. Hauke | Dem. | West Allis | Milwaukee | January 1, 1973 | January 3, 1983 | |
| John Antaramian | Dem. | Kenosha | Kenosha | January 3, 1983 | January 7, 1985 | |
| Thomas A. Hauke | Dem. | West Allis | Milwaukee | January 7, 1985 | January 3, 1993 | |
| John La Fave | Dem. | Milwaukee | Milwaukee, Ozaukee | January 3, 1993 | January 6, 2003 | |
| Curt Gielow | Rep. | Mequon | Milwaukee, Ozaukee | January 6, 2003 | January 3, 2007 | |
| Jim Ott | Rep. | Mequon | Milwaukee, Ozaukee | January 3, 2007 | January 4, 2021 | |
| Deb Andraca | Dem. | Whitefish Bay | Milwaukee, Ozaukee | January 4, 2021 | Current | |
