= Jim Ott =

American meteorologist and politician

Member of the Wisconsin State Assembly from the 23rd district
- In office January 3, 2007 – January 4, 2021
- Preceded by: Curt Gielow
- Succeeded by: Deb Andraca

Personal details
- Born: June 5, 1947 (age 79) Milwaukee, Wisconsin, U.S.
- Party: Republican
- Spouse: Carol
- Children: 2
- Education: University of Wisconsin–Milwaukee (BS, MS); Marquette University Law School (JD)
- Profession: Meteorologist, politician
- Website: Official website

Military service
- Allegiance: United States
- Branch/service: United States Army
- Years of service: 1970–1973
- Unit: U.S. Army Security Agency
- Battles/wars: Vietnam War
- Awards: Vietnam Campaign Medal

Jim Ott (born June 5, 1947) is an American politician and former television meteorologist. A Republican, he was a seven-term member of the Wisconsin State Assembly representing assembly district 23, serving from 2007 to 2021. Before being elected to the assembly, he was a broadcast meteorologist in Milwaukee for Journal Communications's WTMJ-TV and WTMJ-AM radio.

== Early life and career ==
Jim Ott was born in Milwaukee, Wisconsin, and graduated from Milwaukee's Washington High School in 1965. He earned his bachelor's degree from the University of Wisconsin–Milwaukee in 1970, and then joined the United States Army. He served three years in the Army with the U.S. Army Security Agency, including a tour in Vietnam in 1971–72. Following his Army service, he returned to school at UW–Milwaukee and obtained his master's degree in 1975.

After earning his master's degree, in 1976 he went to work as an on-air meteorologist for Journal Communications on their WTMJ-TV television and WTMJ-AM radio stations. He worked there for 30 years, leaving only when he was elected to the Wisconsin State Assembly in 2006. During his time at Journal Communications, he became a member of the unit holders' council, chairperson of stock and information committee, and employee representative on the board of directors.

He returned to school and obtained his J.D. from Marquette University Law School in 2000.

While working as a meteorologist, he also served as adjunct faculty at University of Wisconsin–Parkside, University of Wisconsin–Milwaukee, Cardinal Stritch University, Carroll University, and Marquette University Law School.

== Political career ==
Following the April 2006 announcement that incumbent state representative Curt Gielow would not seek re-election in 2006, Ott declared his candidacy for office. In the Republican primary, Ott defeated John Wirth and went on to win the general election with 56% of the vote over Democrat Stanley F. Teplin. He went on to win re-election six times.

He was defeated for reelection by Democrat Deb Andraca on November 3, 2020.

== Personal life and family ==
Jim Ott is married with two adult sons. He and his wife reside in Mequon, Wisconsin. He has been a member of the Lumen Christi Catholic Parish in Mequon since 1986. He is a member of the American Legion and the American Meteorological Society.

== Electoral history ==
=== Wisconsin Assembly (2006, 2008) ===
Wisconsin Assembly, 23rd District Election, 2006
Party	Candidate	Votes	%	±%
Republican Primary, September 12, 2006
Republican	Jim Ott	3,170	67.12%	
Republican	John Wirth	1,553	32.88%	
Plurality		1,617	34.24%	
Total votes		4,723	100.0%	
General Election, November 7, 2006
Republican	Jim Ott	13,284	56.09%	−42.62%
Democratic	Stanley F. Teplin	10,394	43.89%	
Plurality		2,890	12.20%	-85.22%
Total votes		23,682	100.0%	+19.01%
Republican hold				

=== Wisconsin Assembly (2018, 2020) ===
Wisconsin Assembly, 23rd District Election, 2018
Party	Candidate	Votes	%	±%
General Election, November 6, 2018
Republican	Jim Ott (incumbent)	18,321	51.93%	−43.64%
Democratic	Liz Sumner	16,939	48.01%	
	Scattering	21	0.06%	
Plurality		1,382	3.92%	-87.22%
Total votes		35,281	100.0%	+31.35%
Republican hold				

Wisconsin Assembly, 23rd District Election, 2020
Party	Candidate	Votes	%	±%
General Election, November 3, 2020
Democratic	Deb Andraca	21,052	51.59%	+3.57%
Republican	Jim Ott (incumbent)	19,728	48.34%	−3.59%
	Scattering	30	0.07%	
Plurality		1,324	3.24%	-0.67%
Total votes		40,810	100.0%	+15.67%
Democratic gain from Republican		Swing	7.16%	

Wisconsin State Assembly
Preceded by Curt Gielow	Member of the Wisconsin State Assembly from the 23rd district January 3, 2007 – January 4, 2021	Succeeded by Deb Andraca
