= Senator Bonniwell =

Senator Bonniwell may refer to:

- H. H. Bonniwell (1860–1935), Minnesota State Senate
- William T. Bonniwell Jr. (1836–1899), Minnesota State Senate
