= Bonniwell =

Bonniwell is a surname. Notable people with the surname include:

- Al Bonniwell (1911–2002), American basketball player
- H. H. Bonniwell (1860–1935), American politician
- Norma Bonniwell (1877–1961), American architect
- Sean Bonniwell (1940–2011), American singer/songwriter
- William T. Bonniwell Jr. (1836–1889), American politician
