= Donna Alvermann =

American educator and researcher

Donna Alvermann is an American educator and researcher in the field of Language and Literacy Education whose work focuses on adolescent literacy in and out of school, inclusive of new media and digital literacies. Her most recent research interest involves developing historical-autobiographical methods for uncovering silences in scholarly writing that mask more than they disclose. She is the Omer Clyde and Elizabeth Parr Aderhold Professor in Education in the Mary Frances Early College of Education at the University of Georgia (UGA). She is also a UGA-appointed Distinguished Research Professor in the Department of Language and Literacy Education.

== Education ==
Alvermann graduated from Syracuse University in 1980 with a Ph.D. in Reading and Language Education, and an M.L.S in Information Studies. She also holds an M.A. from the University of Texas at Austin, with a major in Education and a minor in History.

== Theoretical framework ==
Alvermann's research builds on James Paul Gee's concepts of capital "D" Discourse and New Literacies, and Allan Luke's Four Literacies Model. She is also influenced by Michel Foucault's philosophy on Discourse and Social Constructionism (especially in regard to Maxine Greene's philosophy on how educational institutions should encourage students to challenge social categorization and power structures, and Judith Green's further development of these ideas), and Harold L. Herber's research on how students read. Patty Lather and Elizabeth St. Pierre's development of post-structuralist and Feminist theory also play a role, and their work on qualitative research in the field of Education provides an important research model.

== Research ==
=== Multi-literacies ===
Currently, Alvermann's primary area of research is that of multi-literacies. In an increasingly digitized world, students use not only print-based texts, but those involving image, sound, and body interaction. Students develop different literacies, some for in-school and some for out-of-school, but the boundaries between academic and non-academic may be illusory. The texts students engage with are often interconnected and multimedia, as they perform online searches on academic materials to supplement school materials, and seek help on their school work in online communities.

Students develop these literacies for personal as well as academic reasons. Even many students who claim not to be readers engage in online discourse about their favorite media properties (including “remixing” texts through things like fan-fiction). They also learn technical skills independently, editing videos, creating music, and designing web-pages. These digital practices can help students academically and in personal development. Those who might not have had the chance otherwise are able to cultivate a voice and an audience. In fact, many try on multiple voices, which may or may not resemble the identities they present in physical spaces.

Many teachers are wary of digital literacies, thinking of them as irrelevant to academics at best. However, these multiple literacies are a reality in students' lives. With the high volume of information available, it can be difficult for students to learn to focus on what is important and think critically about the texts they engage; this is why it is important for teachers to help students develop their literacy skills for success in academics and beyond. In Alvermann's view, “preferable are studies designed to treat contexts not as structured, impermeable containers but as sieves through which social, cultural, economic, and political discourses animate one another.”

=== Popular culture ===
Related to Alvermann's studies in multi-literacies is her research on students' interests in popular culture and whether this can be used in the classroom. Although conventional thinking tends to view pop culture as shallow and unworthy of discussion, students are motivated to think critically about their favorite media; even those considered “struggling readers” for their failure to live up to cultural academic standards often read and engage with the texts they enjoy of their own free will. This kind of “play” encourages free thinking. Alvermann advocates for bringing these personal interests into the classroom, mixing them with more traditional academics, and facilitating classroom discussion instead of unilateral lecture transmission of information from the teacher. Notably, this interaction should not be made to feel like work, as this will cause students to lose interest, nor should it focus solely on enjoyment, because this does not teach critical thinking skills. In addition to the motivational factor, students are also validated and feel appreciated when teachers take an interest in the media they enjoy. Teachers can collect information on students' interests through survey and conversation.

=== Literacy and domain knowledge ===
Another of Alvermann's prominent areas of research is on how teachers learn to teach not only the content but the discourse of their field. Alvermann argues that different academic disciplines require different and sometimes conflicting discourses, with different terminology, signs, and symbols. Students who are not familiar with the different discourses in their core subject areas (e.g., English, social studies/history, mathematics, and the sciences) may have difficulty understanding the content; therefore, it is important that all subject matter teachers instruct students in how to comprehend materials in the different content areas.

Domain knowledge is also affected by how completely or incompletely the content is presented in the various disciplines when important information is missing.

=== Classroom discussion ===
Alvermann has advocated for classroom discussion of texts, rather than unilateral transmission of information from teachers. This encourages students to engage with on a critical level, as opposed to simply memorizing information. Students are also empowered and more encouraged to read when their personal thoughts and opinions on texts are validated. Class discussion also facilitates a sense of community among classmates. Strategies range from encouraging students to answer questions with detailed answers that draw from the text, to breaking students up into smaller groups so that everyone is involved in the discussion.

Alvermann acknowledges pitfalls of class discussion, such as the tendency for students to get off topic, for a few to dominate the conversation, or for engagement in gendered behavior (female students qualifying or apologizing for their speech, reinforcement of beliefs about which texts will appeal to which gender, etc.). This is why it is important for teachers to moderate.

While the type and degree of moderation necessary is still a topic of debate (and admittedly somewhat dependent on the class and subject matter), Alvermann advocates for an approach that encourages students to consider the social-political forces that have shaped not only the texts, but also their relationships to the texts and their identities as a whole. Graphic organizers (i.e. diagrams of central questions and topics for discussion) can also help focus discussion.

== Selected peer-reviewed articles ==
Alvermann is the author or co-author of over 100 peer-reviewed articles, including:

- Alvermann, D. E., Cho, A., Gannon, M., Mondi, J., Obradovic, M., Pulliam, A., Qi, F., Readhead, S., Wright, W. T., & Yeom, E. Y. (in press). Archival encounters via podcasts: Diversity and voice in practice and research. English Education.
- Hoffman, J. V., & Alvermann, D. E. (2020). What a genealogical analysis of Nila Banton Smith’s American Reading Instruction reveals about the present through the past. Reading Research Quarterly, 55(2), 251-269.
- Alvermann, D. E., & Wilson, A. A. (2011). Comprehension strategy instruction for multimodal texts in science. Theory into Practice, 50(2), 116-124.
- Alvermann, D. E. (2008). Commentary: Why bother theorizing adolescents' online literacies for classroom practice and research? Journal of Adolescent & Adult Literacy, 52, 8-19.
- Alvermann, D.E., & Hruby, G. G. (2000). Mentoring and reporting research: A concern for aesthetics. Reading Research Quarterly, 35, 46-63.
- Alvermann, D. E., Young, J. P., Weaver, D., Hinchman, K. A., Moore, D. W., Phelps, S. F., Thrash, E. C., & Zalewski, P. (1996). Middle and high school students' perceptions of how they experience text- based discussions: A multicase study. Reading Research Quarterly. 31, 244-267.
- Alvermann, D. E., O'Brien, D. G., & Dillon, D. R. (1990). What teachers do when they say they're having discussions of content reading assignments: A qualitative analysis. Reading Research Quarterly, 25(4), 296-322.
- Alvermann, D. E., & Hayes, D. A. (1989). Classroom discussion of content area reading assignments: An intervention study. Reading Research Quarterly, 24(3), 305-335.
- Alvermann, D. E., Smith, L. C., & Readence, J. E. (1985). Prior knowledge activation and the comprehension of compatible and incompatible text. Reading Research Quarterly, 20(4), 420-436.

== Selected books ==
Alvermann has authored or co-authored over twenty books, including:

- Alvermann, D. E., Unrau, N. J., Sailors, M., & Ruddell, R. B. (Eds.). (2019). Theoretical models and processes of literacy (7th ed., 624 pp.). New York, NY: Routledge/Taylor & Francis Group
- Alvermann, D. E., Unrau, N. J., Sailors, M., & Ruddell, R. B. (Eds.). (2019). Theoretical models and processes of literacy (7th ed., 624 pp.). New York: Routledge.
- Alvermann, D. E., & Hinchman, K. A. (Eds.). (2012). Reconceptualizing the literacies in adolescents’ lives (3rd ed.). New York: Routledge.
- Alvermann, D. E. (Ed.). (2010). Adolescents’ online literacies: Connecting classrooms, digital media, and popular culture. New York: Peter Lang.
- Alvermann, D. E. (Ed.). (2002). Adolescents and literacies in a digital world. New York: Peter Lang.
- Alvermann, D. E., Moon, J. S., & Hagood, M. C. (1999). Popular culture in the classroom: Teaching and researching critical media literacy. Newark, DE: International Reading Association

== Selected peer-reviewed chapters ==
Alvermann is the author or co-author of over 100 book chapters, including:

- Alvermann, D. E., Wynne, E., & Wright, W. T. (2022). Tales from TikTok: Gender and cultural intersectionalities. In Genders, cultures and literacies: Understanding intersecting identities (pp. 198-211). Routledge.
- Alvermann, D. E., & Wright, W. T. (2021). Adolescent literacies. In Oxford Research Encyclopedia of Education. Oxford University Press. https://doi.org/10.1093/acrefore/9780190264093.013.1532
- Alvermann, D. E., & Sanders, R. K. (2019). Adolescent literacy in a digital world. In The international encyclopedia of media literacy. Hoboken, NJ: Wiley.
- Alvermann, D. E., & Moje, E. B. (2019). A relational model of adolescent literacy instruction: Disrupting the discourse of “every teacher a teacher of reading.” In Theoretical models and processes of literacy (7th ed., pp. 362-380). New York: Routledge.
- Alvermann, D. E., & Robinson, B. (2017). Youths’ global engagement in digital writing ecologies. In Handbook of Writing, Literacies and Education in Digital Cultures (pp. 161-172). New York: Routledge.
- Alvermann, D. E., Beach, C. L., & Boggs, G. L. (2016). What does digital media allow us to “do” to one another? Economic significance of content and connection. In Handbook of research on the societal impact of digital media (pp. 2151-2174). Hershey, PA: IGI Global.
- Alvermann, D. E. (2011). Popular culture and literacy practices. In Handbook of reading research: Volume IV (pp. 541-560). New York: Routledge.
- Alvermann, D. E. (2010). The teaching of reading. In Reading the past, writing the future: A century of American literacy education and the National Council of Teachers of English (pp. 55-90). Urbana, IL: NCTE.
