= University of Michigan School of Education =

School of education of the University of Michigan

University of Michigan Marsal Family School of Education
- Former name: University of Michigan School of Education
- Type: Public school of education
- Established: 1921; 105 years ago
- Parent institution: University of Michigan
- Dean: Elizabeth Birr Moje
- Students: 435 (FA 2015)
- Undergraduates: 128 (FA 2015)
- Postgraduates: 307 (FA 2015)
- Location: Ann Arbor, Michigan
- Campus: Urban
- Website: marsal.umich.edu

The University of Michigan Marsal Family School of Education is the school of education of the University of Michigan, a public research university in Ann Arbor, Michigan, United States.

The School of Education offers undergraduate, master's, and doctoral degrees.

== History ==
The School of Education can be traced to the first charter of the University of Michigania, approved by the territorial government in 1817, which initially gave the university control over the state's entire system of public instruction. Although this arrangement was changed, the links between the university and the state's schools were firmly established.

In the spring of 1879, the Regents of the university created the Chair of the Science and Art of Teaching, the first full-time, permanent professorial chair in any American college or university devoted exclusively to the preparation of teachers. This regental act recognized that many university students would become teachers and school administrators and that they would not be prepared for their work without instruction in education.

John Dewey spent the years 1884–1894 at the University of Michigan, and while not directly involved in the education program, he left his imprint on the university and was instrumental in launching the State of Michigan school accreditation program.

The school considers its formal founding year as 1921 and celebrated its centennial in 2021.

In February 2023, the University of Michigan School of Education was renamed the Marsal Family School of Education following a US$50 million donation to the school from the family of Kathleen and Bryan Marsal.
