= Steven D. Loucks =

American politician

Steve Loucks

Member of the Wisconsin State Assembly
- In office 1989–1993

Personal details
- Born: Steven D. Loucks; September 8, 1961 (age 64) Saint Paul, Minnesota, U.S.
- Party: Republican
- Education: Marquette University (BA)

Steven D. Loucks (born September 8, 1961) is an American politician and former lobbyist who served as a member of the Wisconsin State Assembly from 1989 to 1993.

== Early life and education ==
Loucks was born in Saint Paul, Minnesota. He graduated from Homestead High School in Mequon, Wisconsin, and earned a Bachelor of Arts degree in history and political science from Marquette University in Milwaukee, Wisconsin.

== Career ==
After graduating from college, Loucks served as an aide in the office of Senator Bob Kasten. He was first elected to the Assembly in 1988 as a Republican.

Loucks had a short but distinctive career in the legislature, especially after being re-elected in 1990. For the 1991-92 session he was elected Vice-Chair of the Minority Caucus of the State Assembly, and also chaired the caucus of ranking minority committee members in the same session.

In January, 1992, he accompanied a fact-finding mission to Croatia, which included US Congressional Representatives. The Croatian War of Independence had begun in March 1991 and was in progress when Loucks and the group made their visit. Loucks said later, "My eyes were just opened wide to refugee crises and the ravages of war ... and it had an impact on me unlike anything else that I've ever experienced," Loucks said. "You saw human suffering, you saw a human toll, and it made me realize that I wanted to do something for these people." (Travel Weekly, May 29, 2017, "Parting with Travel Leaders Group, Loucks reflects on career")

Loucks announced he would not seek a third term on June 1, 1992. On June 2, 1992 the United States Federal Court for the Western District of Wisconsin ruled in Prosser et al. vs. Elections Board et al. and the ruling imposed new legislative and Congressional districts in Wisconsin (overturning districts that the legislature had approved and the Governor had signed earlier that year). The ruling left Loucks' then current district, which had experienced a large population increase over the previous ten years, split among four different districts. His district (the 58th Assembly District) had been located entirely in Ozaukee and Washington Counties in Wisconsin; after the ruling, his home was located in a new district (the 23rd Assembly District) now located mostly within Milwaukee County. The new district was now located in a different State Senate District and thus had a State Senator different from the one who represented the 58th District.

After retiring from the Wisconsin State Assembly at the end of 1992, Loucks moved to Washington, D.C., where he embarked on a career in public relations, working first for Ruder Finn. The firm did public relations promoting tourism for the Government of Croatia in the United States. In this role Loucks performed a number of roles including staffing the "Rebuild Dubrovnik Fund," which was chaired by the American Society of Travel Agents (ASTA) President Earlene Causey and garnered support from many sources including UNESCO (the United Nations Educational, Scientific, and Cultural Organization).

In 1994 Loucks joined ASTA as its director of communications. More recently Loucks served as the CCO for Travel Leaders Group, a Minnesota-based travel agency company with nearly $21 billion in annual sales; Loucks departed the company in May 2017. Since 2021, he has worked as a talent consultant for Medtronic.

Loucks is also actively involved in the arts, having served on the Board of Directors for Minneapolis-based Theater Latte Da, a musical theater company, and supporter of Steppenwolf Theatre Company in Chicago, Illinois.
