= Concordia University Ann Arbor =

University in Michigan

- Former names: Concordia Lutheran Junior College (1963–1976); Concordia College (1976–2001)
- Motto: Christ First in Everything
- Type: Private satellite campus
- Established: 1963
- Parent institution: Concordia University Wisconsin
- Religious affiliation: Lutheran Church–Missouri Synod
- President: Erik Ankerberg
- Students: 1,351 (2023-2024) 2023 Enrollment Record
- Location: Ann Arbor, Michigan, United States; 42.3072059°N 83.6940974°W
- Campus: 187 acres (76 ha)
- Colors: Red, Black & White
- Nickname: Cardinals
- Sporting affiliations: NAIA – WHAC; NAIA – MSFA; NCCAA Division I – Midwest
- Mascot: Corky The Cardinal
- Website: www.cuaa.edu

Concordia University Ann Arbor (CUAA) is the Ann Arbor, Michigan, campus of Concordia University Wisconsin, a private Lutheran university in Mequon, Wisconsin. As part of Concordia University, it is accredited by the Higher Learning Commission.

Concordia University Ann Arbor’s previous campus was a 187-acre (76 ha) property situated along the banks of the Huron River, about ten minutes from downtown Ann Arbor, Michigan. That campus is now owned by University of Michigan. The current Concordia campus, formerly known as the North Campus, is located on Plymouth Road in Ann Arbor.

Concordia is affiliated with the Lutheran Church–Missouri Synod (LCMS) and is a member of the Concordia University System. CUAA merged with Concordia University Wisconsin in 2013.

== History ==
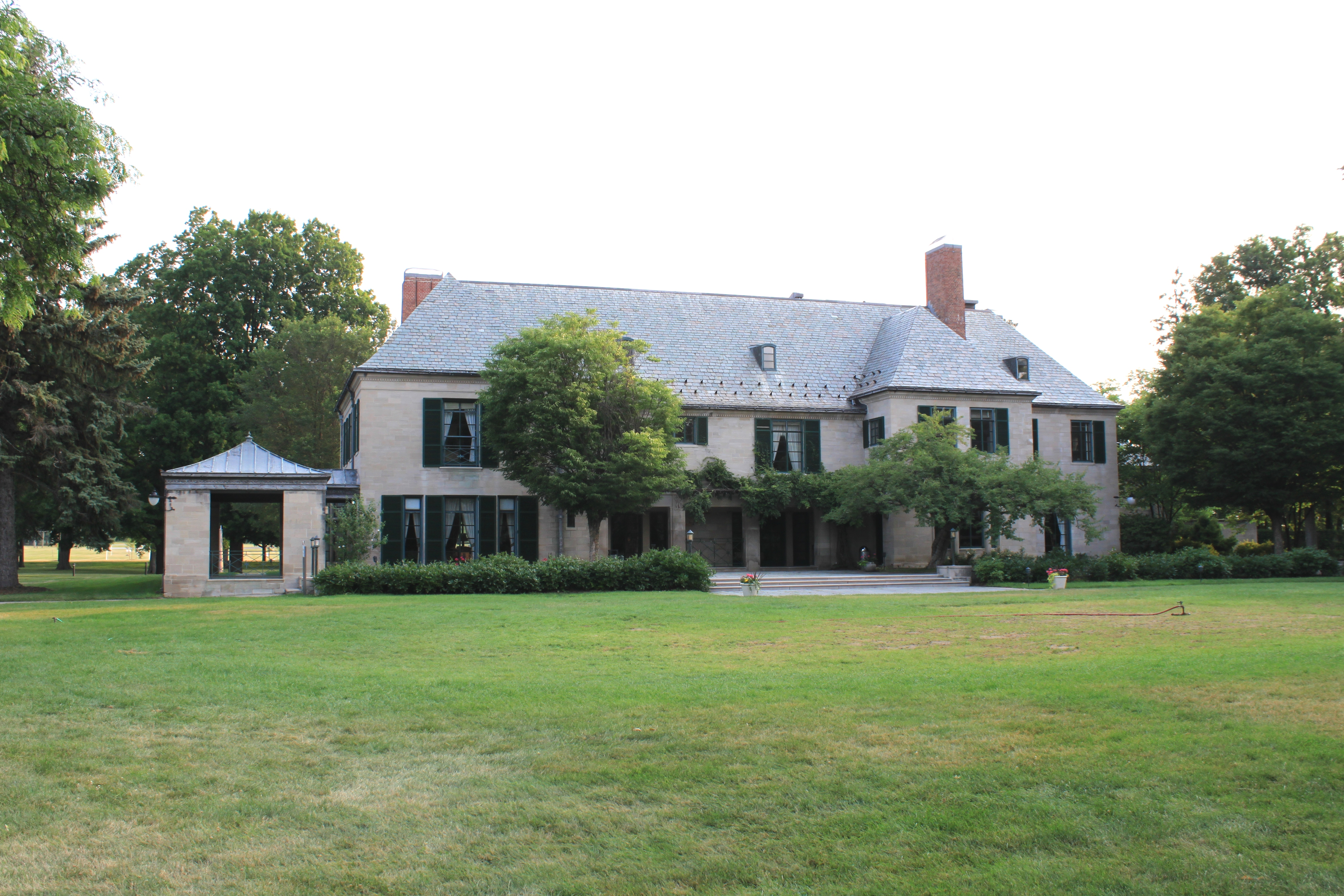
Earhart Manor on the Concordia campus

In the early 1960s, the LCMS purchased the Earhart Manor and surrounding estate in Ann Arbor and began construction of Concordia Lutheran Junior College. The campus was designed by architect Vincent Kling in a mid-century modern style. Classes began in the fall of 1963 with 236 students and 24 instructors. The school began offering four-year degree programs in 1976 and changed its name to Concordia College. It assumed its current name in 2001.

In 1977, Concordia began performing the "Boars Head Festival", an annual Christmas celebration filled with song, music, and drama that is much beloved by current students, alumni, and community members.

In the 2000s, the university experienced "a number of financial, enrollment and administrative difficulties" that prompted it to enter into discussions with Concordia University Wisconsin about a possible merger. The merger became effective on July 1, 2013, with Curt Gielow, former executive dean of CUW's School of Pharmacy and former mayor of Mequon, Wisconsin, becoming Vice President of Administration and Chief Campus Officer at CUAA. He was replaced at the end of 2018 by Ryan Peterson.

In 2015, the university purchased the former Ann Arbor campus of the Thomas M. Cooley Law School. That facility, two miles (3.2 km) north of the main campus, is now the home of CUAA's School of Nursing.

In 2022, the university named Erik Ankerberg its next president. He began his duties in January 2023, prior to the spring semester.

In mid-February 2024 local news sources reported that Ankerberg had alerted the students, faculty, and staff that the university's financial situation was forcing the Ann Arbor campus's mission to be "re-imagined", likely leading to significant reductions in the programs and the sale of some of the equipment and property. John Berg, chairman of the board, released a video stating that the campus would remain at full operations for the 2024-2025 academic year. He also stated that a sub-committee was created to help develop a path forward, which was later revealed, to help the university separate from the Wisconsin campus. The plan to become independent was later deemed to be unworkable and instead the institution's leaders decided to cut most academic programs. Beginning in June 2025, the institution will only offer 9 programs on campus, all focused on healthcare, and 7 programs online, mostly focused on education; this is a reduction from 53 programs previously offered on campus and 60 programs previously offered online.

In May 2026, Concordia reached an agreement with the University of Michigan to sell the Ann Arbor campus. The Michigan Board of Regents approved the transaction at its May 21, 2026 meeting. The Ann Arbor City Council opposes the purchase by UM saying Concordia should sell the property should to a developer who will construct needed housing in the area.

Undergraduate admissions statistics
- 2018 entering class
- Admit rate: 50.0 (1,023 out of 2,049)
- Yield rate: 22.9 (234 out of 1,023)

Test scores middle 50%
- ACT Composite: 19-24 (among 99% of FTFs)

== Athletics ==
The Concordia–Ann Arbor (CUAA) athletic teams were called the Cardinals. The school's mascot was named Corky the Cardinal. The university was a member of the National Association of Intercollegiate Athletics (NAIA), primarily competing in the Wolverine–Hoosier Athletic Conference (WHAC) for most of its sports from 1992–93 to 2024–25; while its football team competed in the Mideast League of the Mid-States Football Association (MSFA). They were also a member of the National Christian College Athletic Association (NCCAA), primarily competing as an independent in the Midwest Region of the Division I level.

CUAA competed in 28 intercollegiate varsity sports: Men's sports included baseball, basketball, bowling, cross country, football, golf, ice hockey, lacrosse, soccer, tennis and track & field (indoor and outdoor). Women's sports included basketball, bowling, cross country, golf, ice hockey, lacrosse, soccer, softball, stunt, tennis, track & field (indoor and outdoor) and volleyball. And co-ed sports included cheerleading, competitive dance and eSports.

=== Accomplishments ===
National Championships:

- 1998 - Softball - NCCAA
- 1999 - Softball - NCCAA
- 2018 - Stephanie Johnston - NAIA Marathon
- 2019 - Cheerleading - NAIA
- 2019 - Baseball - NCCAA
- 2022 - Baseball - NCCAA
- 2023 - Softball - NCCAA
- 2024 - Softball - NCCAA

== Notable alumni ==
- Jonathan Coddington – American football coach
- Magali Frezzotti – American softball coach
- Kenneth Horn – American politician
- Newton Howard – American cognitive scientist
- Toby Jones – American basketball coach
- Elizabeth Birr Moje – American educator and University of Michigan administrator
