= Mequon-Thiensville School District =

School district in Wisconsin

The Mequon-Thiensville School District (MTSD) is a school district that serves the Milwaukee suburbs of Mequon and Thiensville, Wisconsin. Since 2017, the superintendent is Matthew Joynt.

The district has a ratio of 16 students per teacher.

== History ==
In recent years, the district has faced fiscal problems as enrollment started to decline and a new state formula was implemented in school funding. After plans for a $7.5 million budget increase were rejected in February 2006, the district hired a local television personality Dennis Krause as a fund-raiser; giving him the title of Community Resource Director.

In 2017 Matthew Joynt became the superintendent.

In 2021 there was a political movement to recall multiple members of the school board.

== Demographics ==
MTSD served 3,563 students in the 2012–2013 school year. The students of the district were 82.7% white, 5.8% black, 5.8% Asian, 3.6% Hispanic, 0.06% Pacific Islander, and 0.02% Native American.

== Schools ==
- Homestead High School
- Steffen Middle School
- Lakeshore Middle School
- Donges Bay Grade School
- Oriole Lane Grade School
- Wilson Grade School

=== Former schools ===
- Range Line Grade School, closed in 2005
- Grand Avenue School, closed in 1982 (converted to condominiums)
