= Jonathan Coddington (American football) =

American football coach (born c. 1992)

Current position
- Title: Head coach
- Team: Anderson (IN)
- Conference: HCAC
- Record: 4–26

Biographical details
- Born: c. 1992 (age 33–34); Cincinnati, Ohio, U.S.
- Education: Anderson University (2014); Concordia University Ann Arbor (2017)

Playing career
- 2011–2014: Anderson (IN)
- Position: Quarterback

Coaching career (HC unless noted)
- 2015: Anderson (IN) (QB)
- 2016: Concordia (MI) (WR/TE)
- 2017: Concordia (MI) (ST/WR/TE)
- 2018–2019: Concordia (MI) (ST/QB)
- 2020–2022: Concordia (MI) (OC/QB)
- 2023–present: Anderson (IN)

Head coaching record
- Overall: 4–26

Jonathan Coddington (born c. 1992) is an American college football coach. He is the head football coach for Anderson University, a position he has held since 2023. He previously coached for Concordia (MI). He played college football for Anderson (IN) as a quarterback.

== Head coaching record ==
Year	Team	Overall	Conference	Standing	Bowl/playoffs
Anderson Ravens (Heartland Collegiate Athletic Conference) (2023–present)
2023	Anderson	0–10	0–7	8th	
2024	Anderson	2–8	1–5	6th	
2025	Anderson	2–8	1–5	6th	
2026	Anderson	0–0	0–0		
Anderson:		4–26	2–17		
Total:		4–26			
