= Isham Day House =

Historic house in Wisconsin, United States

- U.S. National Register of Historic Places
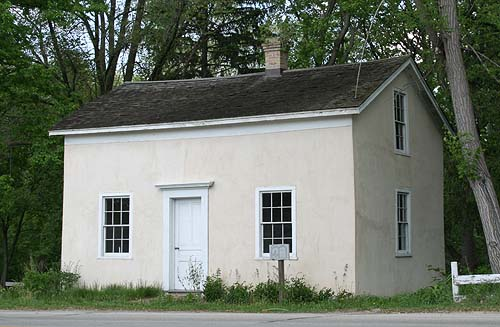
- Isham Day House

- Location within Wisconsin Location within the United States
- Location: 11312 N. Cedarburg Rd. Mequon, Wisconsin
- Coordinates: 43°13′25″N 87°59′0″W
- Area: 1.9 acres (0.77 ha)
- Built: 1839
- Architect: Day Isham
- NRHP reference No.: 00001558
- Added to NRHP: December 28, 2000

The Isham Day House is located in Mequon, Wisconsin. It was added to the National Register of Historic Places in 2000. The house is owned by the city and located in Settlers Park.

== See also ==
- List of the oldest buildings in Wisconsin
