= Deb Andraca =

American Democratic politician (b. 1970)

Member of the Wisconsin State Assembly from the 23rd district
- Incumbent
- Assumed office January 4, 2021
- Preceded by: Jim Ott

Personal details
- Born: Deborah Jane Anderson; April 10, 1970 (age 56) Springfield, Massachusetts, U.S.
- Party: Democratic
- Spouse: Marc Andraca (m. 1998)
- Children: Mia, Andie
- Education: Syracuse University (BA); George Washington University (MA); Alverno College (teacher's cert.)
- Occupation: politician, public relations, educator
- Website: Campaign website; Campaign twitter

Deborah Andraca (née Anderson; born April 10, 1970) is an American politician, public relations specialist, and educator. A Democrat, she represents the 23rd district of the Wisconsin State Assembly. The 23rd assembly district comprises three northeastern Milwaukee County suburbs—Whitefish Bay, Fox Point, and Bayside—as well as the village of Grafton and eastern portions of Mequon and the town of Grafton. She was elected to her first term in November 2020.

== Early life and education ==
Deb Andraca was born Deborah Jane Anderson in Springfield, Massachusetts, and moved with her parents to Pennsylvania as a child. She graduated from Manheim Township High School in 1988 and earned her bachelor's degree in political science and public relations from Syracuse University in 1992. After graduating from Syracuse, she moved to Washington, D.C., and worked for the Solar Energy Industries Association—a non-profit trade association which promotes the solar energy industry in the United States. While working full time for the SEIA, she also attended George Washington University and earned her master's in political management.

== Early career ==
She moved with her then-fiancé to Chicago, where she worked as communications director for the Environmental Law and Policy Center, worked as press secretary for U.S. representative Lynn N. Rivers on her successful 2000 re-election campaign, and was vice president at the Chicago office of FleishmanHillard, a public relations firm. They then moved to Houston, and finally to Milwaukee. After the birth of her daughters, Andraca became a stay-at-home mom to raise them.

Over the next several years, she remained involved in her community, leading her daughters' Girl Scouts troops, volunteering at her daughters' schools, and serving as a board member and president of the school's parent-teacher organization. After the Sandy Hook Elementary School shooting, Andraca became involved with Moms Demand Action for Gun Sense and began working to earn a teacher's license from Alverno College. She has worked as a substitute teacher for the Whitefish Bay School District and Bruce-Guadalupe Community School in the years leading up to her 2020 Assembly campaign.

== Political career ==
In December 2019, she announced she would be a candidate for Wisconsin State Assembly, challenging 14-year incumbent Jim Ott. In her 2020 election campaign, she described her experience as a teacher conducting a lockdown drill with a group of third graders as motivation. She asserted that years of correspondence and meeting requests with Ott had been ignored as she sought to communicate her concerns to her state representative.

Ott was seeking his 8th term in what had been a traditionally safe Republican district—Ott had won his re-election in 2012 and 2014 with more than 60% of the vote, and faced no opponent in 2016. Following the election of Donald Trump, however, suburban districts—like the 23rd—began to shift away from the Republican Party. In 2018, Ott managed only 52% of the general election vote. As a result of the movement in suburbs, Ott was a top target for Democrats in 2020, and Andraca reported strong fundraising success in the first half of 2020. Andraca was also assisted by Emerge Wisconsin, an organization which recruits, trains, and supports Democratic women running for office in Wisconsin.

Andraca was one of several candidates who dealt with death threats during the 2020 election. She sought a restraining order against a man who said he wanted her to be shot, but the request was denied due to lack of evidence implying an imminent threat. She also had to stop using her personal cell phone after her number was released on mailers distributed by the conservative political action committee Wisconsin Manufacturers & Commerce.

In the general election, Andraca defeated Ott, taking 51.5% of the vote. She was one of only two candidates in Wisconsin to defeat an incumbent in the 2020 general election.

In 2025, Andraca handed out Valentines on Valentine's Day to all members of the legislature as a sign of bipartisanship. She cited experience of doing something similar in her former 3rd grade classes.

== Personal life and family ==
Deb Anderson took the name Andraca after she married Marc Andraca in 1998. They have two daughters and reside in Whitefish Bay, Wisconsin.

== Electoral history ==
=== Wisconsin Assembly (2020–present) ===
Year	Election	Date	Elected				Defeated				Total	Plurality
2020	General	Nov. 3	Deb Andraca	Democratic	21,052	51.59%	Jim Ott (inc)	Rep.	19,728	48.34%	40,810	1,324
2022	General	Nov. 8	Deb Andraca (inc)	Democratic	21,236	62.73%	Purima Nath	Rep.	12,589	37.19%	33,853	8,647
2024	General	Nov. 5	Deb Andraca (inc)	Democratic	23,804	62.57%	Laurie O'Brien Wolf	Rep.	14,199	37.32%	38,046	9,605

Wisconsin State Assembly
Preceded by Jim Ott	Member of the Wisconsin State Assembly from the 23rd district January 4, 2021 – present	Incumbent
