= Cold Sunday =

1982 meteorological event

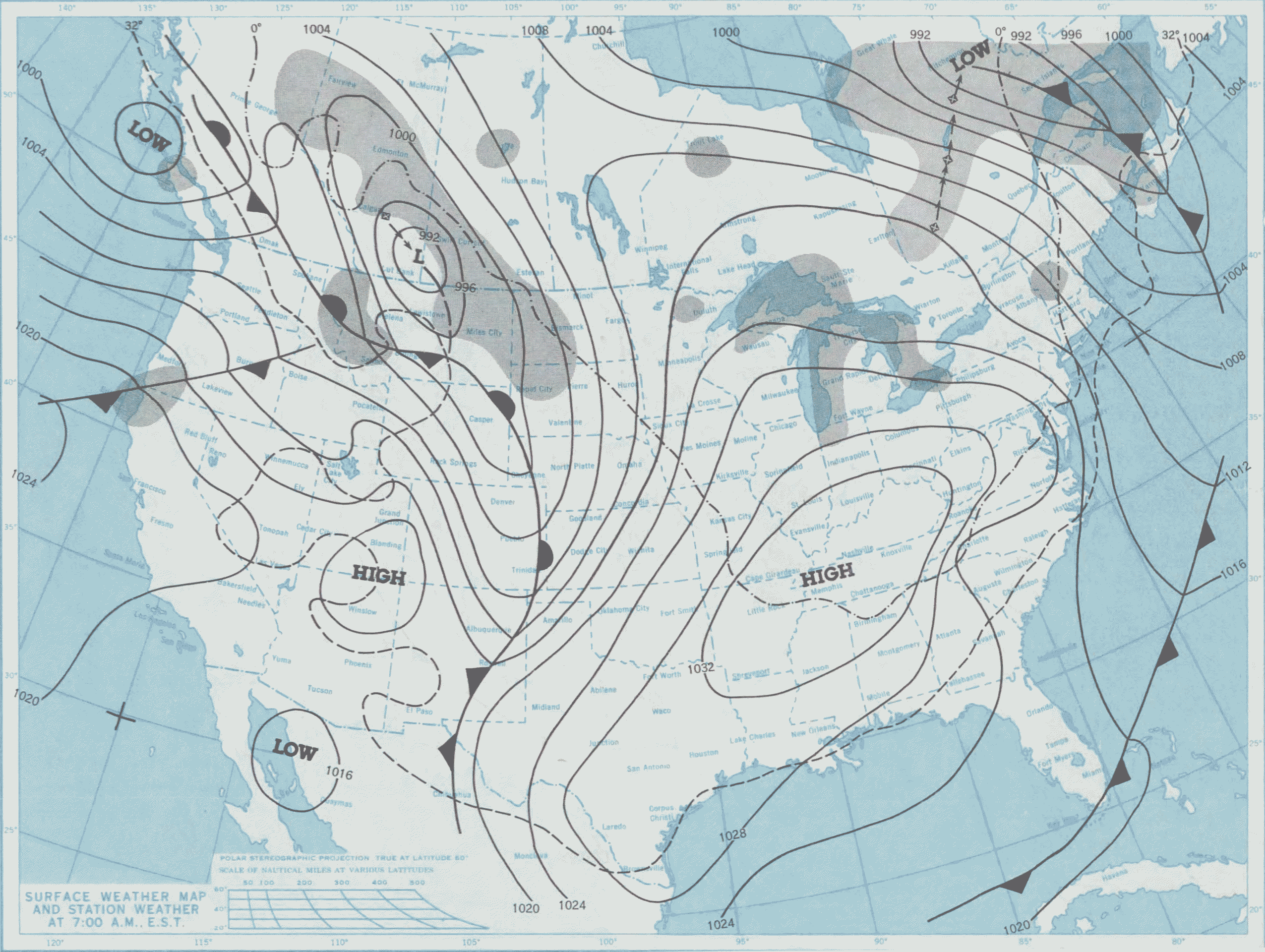
National Weather Service surface weather map from January 17, 1982.

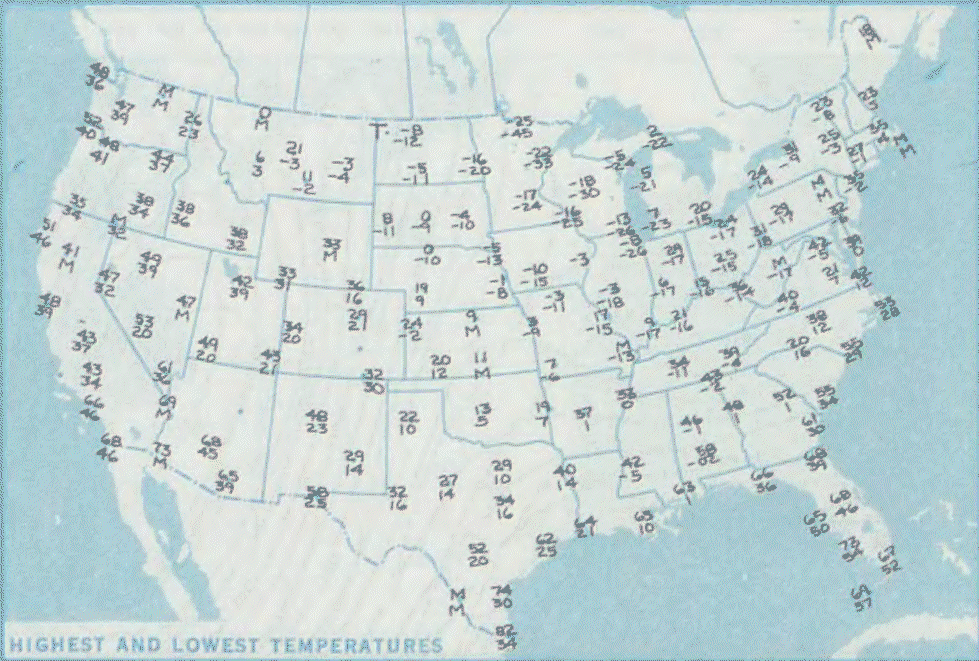
National Weather Service high and low temperature map (Fahrenheit) from January 17, 1982.

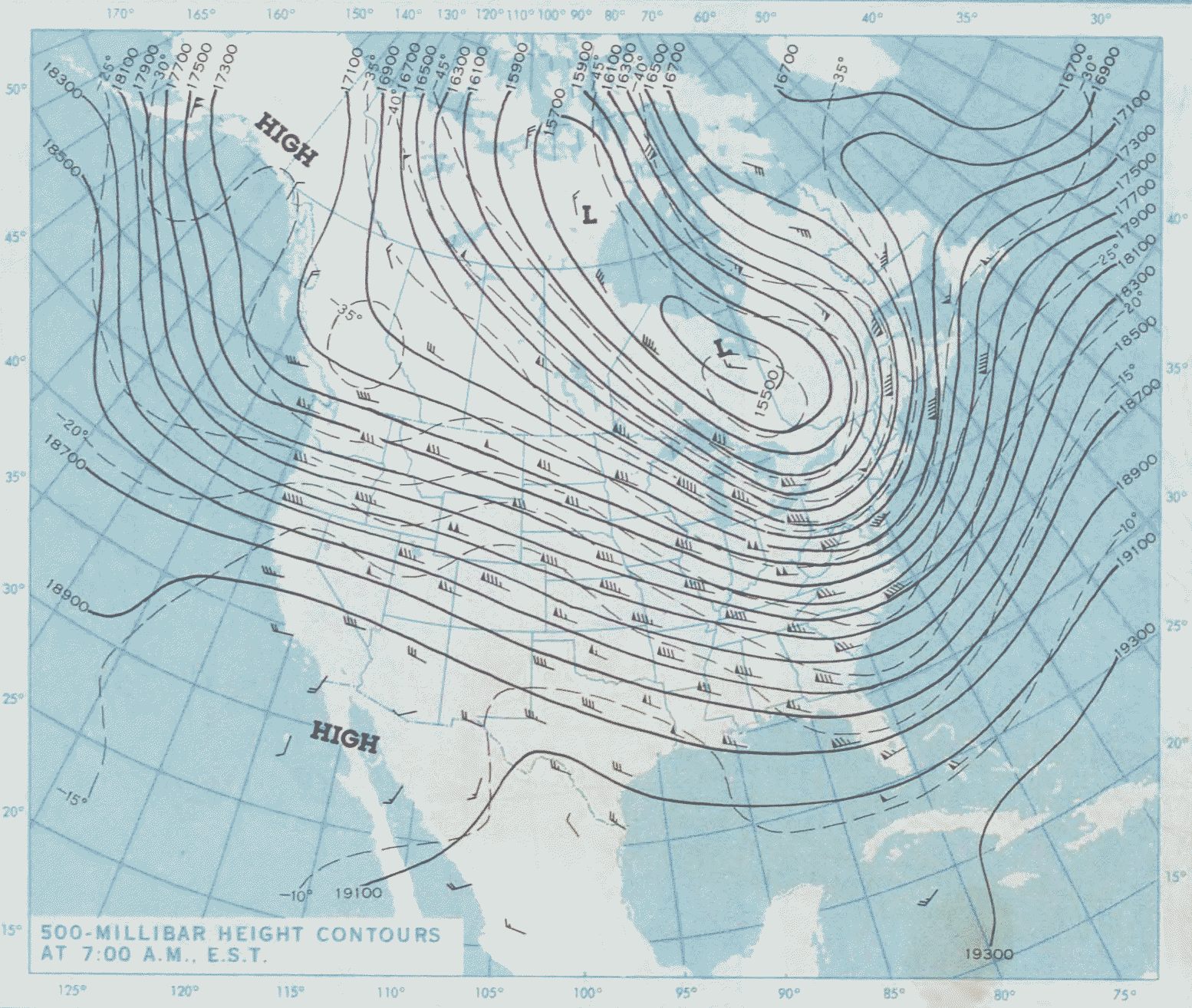
National Weather Service 500 millibar height contour map from January 17, 1982.

"Cold Sunday" was a meteorological event which took place on January 17, 1982, when unprecedentedly cold air swept down from Canada and plunged temperatures across much of the United States far below existing all-time record lows.

The phenomenon was caused by an unusually strong high pressure system over Saskatchewan with a core pressure of 1,055 millibars (31.2 inHg), a level rarely seen outside of permanent polar areas such as Siberia and Antarctica. A recent snowfall had left the ground without any way to hold on to its heat and temperatures dropped precipitously. This mass of cold air was so strong that the temperature at Mequon, Wisconsin, dropped to −40 °F (−40 °C); the previous record was −28 °F (−33 °C) and temperatures below −20 °F (−29 °C) had been felt there only six times in the previous 100 years. The lowest temperature recorded that day in the United States was −52 °F (−47 °C), measured near Tower, Minnesota.

Below is a partial list of cities which set all-time record low temperatures in the United States. This is only a small fraction of all locales setting record low temperatures: Hundreds of towns and cities from North Dakota to New Jersey to Mississippi broke records, and the vast majority of the records set on "Cold Sunday" still stand, as of 2024. The cold was not confined to the night, either. In Princeton, New Jersey, and Cincinnati, Ohio, the daytime high temperatures were 2 °F (−17 °C) and −9 °F (−23 °C). The average high temperature in January is 39 °F (4 °C) in both cities.

== Temperatures ==
- International Falls, Minnesota: −45 °F (−43 °C)
- Saint Cloud, Minnesota: −35 °F (−37 °C)
- Madison, Wisconsin: −31 °F (−35 °C)
- Green Bay, Wisconsin: −28 °F (−33 °C)
- Milwaukee, Wisconsin: −26 °F (−32 °C)
- Moline, Illinois: −23 °F (−31 °C)
- Peoria, Illinois: −23 °F (−31 °C)
- Akron, Ohio: −22 °F (−30 °C)
- Pittsburgh, Pennsylvania: −18 °F (−28 °C)
- Cleveland, Ohio: −17 °F (−27 °C)
- Jackson, Mississippi: −5 °F (−21 °C)
- Washington, D.C.: −5 °F (−21 °C)
- Birmingham, Alabama: −2 °F (−19 °C)

== Chicago, Illinois ==
The previous day (January 16, 1982) Chicago, Illinois saw a low temperature of −25 °F (−32 °C). This would have set a record, except that the preceding weekend, on January 10, another arctic event had brought the temperature down to −26 °F (−32 °C), a record that stood until January 20, 1985.
