= Fred J. Busse =

American politician

Fred J. Busse (c. 1864 – May 27, 1940) was an American politician. He was a member of the Wisconsin State Assembly. Busse was elected to the Assembly in 1922 and 1924. Additionally, he was Town Chairman (similar to Mayor) of Mequon, Wisconsin and a member of the County Board of Ozaukee County, Wisconsin. He was a Republican.

Busse died in Milwaukee, Wisconsin on May 27, 1940 at the age of 76.
