= John Reichert Farmhouse =

Historic house in Wisconsin, United States

- U.S. National Register of Historic Places
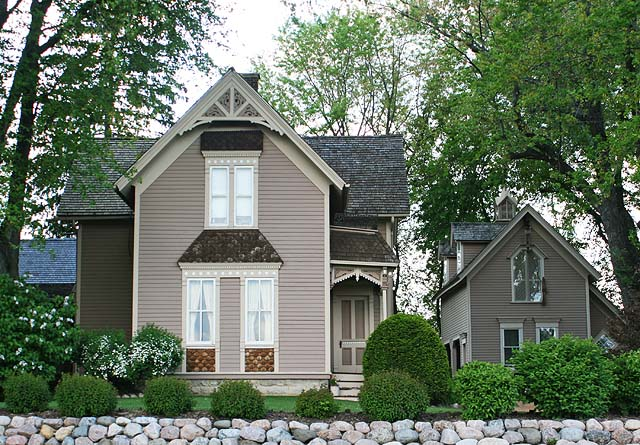
- John Reichert Farmhouse

- Location within Wisconsin
- Location: 14053 N. Wauwatosa Rd. Mequon, Wisconsin
- Coordinates: 43.273321°N 88.004337°W
- Built: 1885
- Architectural style: Stick-Eastlake
- NRHP reference No.: 82000693
- Added to NRHP: July 1, 1982

The John Reichert Farmhouse is a Stick style house built around 1885 and located in Mequon, Wisconsin, United States. It was added to the National Register of Historic Places in 1982.

John Reichert built this house around 1885 on his 80-acre farm. The house is two stories, with a cross-gable floor-plan. The east and north ends sport trompe-l'œil bay windows. Above them the gable peaks are decorated with elaborate woodwork.
