= O'Brien–Peuschel Farmstead =

- U.S. National Register of Historic Places
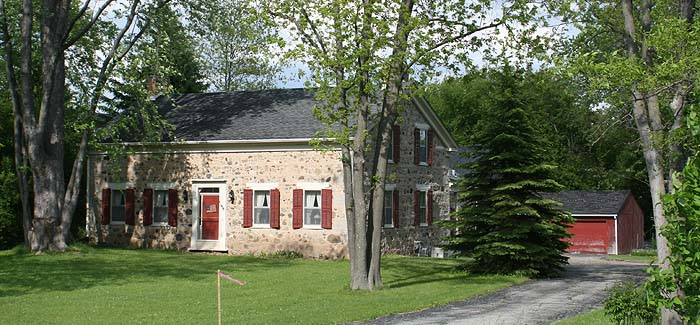
- O'Brien–Peuschel Farmstead
- Location: 12510 N. Wauwatosa Rd. Mequon, Wisconsin
- Architectural style: Greek Revival
- NRHP reference No.: 00001236
- Added to NRHP: October 24, 2000

The O'Brien–Peuschel Farmstead is located in Mequon, Wisconsin, United States. It was added to the National Register of Historic Places in 2000.
