= Peter Goldberg =

American CEO (1948–2011)

- Born: July 14, 1948
- Died: August 12, 2011 (aged 63); Sally Mountain near Jackman, Maine
- Occupation: Business / Nonprofit organizations

Peter Goldberg (July 14, 1948 – August 12, 2011) was president and CEO of the Alliance for Children and Families. He was also president and CEO of Families International, the parent holding company to the Alliance for Children and Families, Ways to Work, FEI Behavioral Health, and United Neighborhood Centers of America. He was a member of the Board of Trustees of the Bridgespan Group.

He died while on vacation in Maine.

== Education and background ==
Goldberg was a graduate of the State University of New York at Albany. He earned a bachelor's degree in political science in 1970.

Prior to becoming president and CEO of the Alliance for Children in Families in 1994, Goldberg held positions in the corporate and philanthropic field, as well as the public sector.

He was President of the Prudential Foundation (1990–94) and head of Primerica's social responsibility programs (1982–88). He was Project Director of the New York State Heroin and Alcohol Abuse Study (1981–82) and Special Assistant to the Director of the U.S. government's National Institute on Alcohol Abuse and Alcoholism (1979–81).

== Honors ==
He was named nine times to The NonProfit Times People of Power & Influence Top 50 list, including in 2011, shortly before his death.

== Personal life ==
Peter married Betsy Goldberg, a speech therapist in the Wauwatosa, Wisconsin public schools. He and Betsy lived in Mequon, Wisconsin. They have two daughters, Jessica and Michelle. Jessica is an associate professor at the University of Maryland. She received her doctorate in economics at the University of Michigan. Michelle is a product design engineer at Apple Inc.
