= Homestead High School (Wisconsin) =

Homestead School

Location
- 5000 West Mequon Road; Mequon, Wisconsin 53092; United States; 43°13′23″N 87°58′18″W

Information
- Type: Public secondary
- Motto: Proud Heritage, Students of Achievement
- Established: 1959
- School district: Mequon-Thiensville School District
- Superintendent: Matthew Joynt
- Principal: Eric Ebert
- Faculty: 72.54 (on an FTE basis)
- Grades: 9–12
- Enrollment: 1,204 (2024–2025)
- Student to teacher ratio: 16.60
- Colors: Red and white
- Fight song: "We Are The Mighty Highlanders"
- Athletics conference: North Shore Conference
- Mascot: Angus the Highlander
- Nickname: Highlanders
- Newspaper: The Highlander Online
- Yearbook: The Tartan
- Website: HHS website

Homestead High School is a four-year public high school located in Mequon, Wisconsin, United States, a northern suburb of Milwaukee. Part of the Mequon-Thiensville School District, it serves a 48-square-mile (120 km^{2}) area including the city of Mequon and the village of Thiensville. The school opened in 1959 and educates nearly 1,300 students annually.

== History ==
The area on which Homestead High School now stands originally belonged to the Potawatomi and Menominee Indians. In 1838, the land was taken by the United States government. Sales of the land occurred in 1835. In 1841 and Peter and Anna Frank received a land grant for the area, and in the following years, the 80-acre land area was owned by their children.

Homestead High School opened in 1959 with just Freshmen and Sophomores. Dr. Merton Campbell served as the first superintendent, and Lauren Dixon served as the first principal. Originally the school consisted of four wings, two music rooms, a small theater, cafeteria, and a gymnasium. Homestead has undergone four renovations/additions. In 1962, another wing was added. Three additional wings, the library, a swimming area, another gymnasium, a lecture hall, and an auditorium were added in 1968. In 1978, the school added an orchestra room. In 1998, the biggest renovation added a wing, a new heating and cooling system, fine arts rooms, another cafeteria with a food court, an academic support center, a field house for athletics, and a conference room for the district.

== Enrollment ==
Of the 1204 students enrolled in 2023–2024, 68.0% were White, 9.1% were Asian, 8.7% were Hispanic, 7.6% were Black, and 6.3% were two or more races.

== Academics ==
Homestead High School teaches courses in business, computer science, cooperative education, engineering and technology, English, family and consumer education, fine arts, foreign language, mathematics, physical education, science, and social studies.

Honors Courses include Advanced Creative Writing and Reading Seminar, Advanced Mass Media and Communications, Programming 1, Advanced Programming, Business Organization and Management, French 4, Algebra 1, Algebra 2/ Trigonometry, American Literature, Biology, Chemistry, English 9, Geometry, Precalculus BC, Independent Studies, Introduction to Business, Latin 4, Latin 5, Mandarin Chinese 4, Multimedia 3, Multivariable Calculus, Personal Finance, Product Development Projects, PLTW: Civil Engineering and Architecture, PLTW: Digital Electronics, PLTW: Computer Integrated Manufacturing, PLTW: Introduction to Engineering Design, PLTW: Principles of Engineering, and Spanish 4

Homestead offers A.P. classes in French, Calculus AB, Calculus BC, Physics 1, Spanish, Statistics, United States History, American Government, Biology, Chemistry, Macroeconomics, Music Theory, Computer Science, Microeconomics, Psychology, English Language/Composition, Seminar, Research, Environmental Science, English Literature/Composition, Human Geography, Physics C, Physics 2, and Studio Art.

== Recognition ==
In 2004 Homestead High School was recognized as a Blue Ribbon School, the highest honor a school can receive from the U.S. Department of Education. It was one of 33 public high schools in the United States to receive the honor that year. In 2009, BusinessWeek magazine ranked Homestead as the top high school in Wisconsin. The magazine noted that Homestead offered the "Best Overall Academic Performance". In 2011, Homestead was named one of the top 500 schools in the nation by Newsweek.

== Athletics ==
Homestead won a state championship in boys cross country in 1967.

Homestead's football team has won six state titles (1999, 2006, 2008, 2012, 2015, 2018)

Athletic Accomplishments at a Glance:

- 28 Varsity sport programs
- 700+ Individual student athletes
- 3.53 Cumulative GPA over the last 3 trimesters
- 280+ Conference championships
- 111 Individual state champions
- 45 Team state champions

=== Conference affiliation history ===
- Braveland Conference (1961-1985)
- North Shore Conference (1985–present)

== Fine Arts ==
The Homestead Fine Arts Department comprises five areas: Band, Choir, Orchestra, Theater, and Visual Arts. Artists can select from courses in acting, directing, technical theatre, concert band, string orchestra, Highlander Choir, metals, ceramics, digital art, painting, photography, AP Music Theory, AP Research, etc.

== Notable alumni ==
- Margaret S. Lewis (1972), former member of the Wisconsin State Assembly
- John Ridley (1982), screenwriter, television director, novelist, and showrunner, known for 12 Years a Slave (film).
- Kaspars Kambala (1997), basketball player who played overseas
- Mike Dunleavy Jr. (1999 - transferred), NBA player and executive for the Golden State Warriors
- Coby Karl (2003), NBA player and coach
- Anthony LoCoco (2008), Wisconsin Court of Appeals judge
- Ben Gardner (2009), NFL linebacker
- Shelby Harris (2009), defensive tackle for the Cleveland Browns
