= Curt Gielow =

American politician (born 1945)

Curt Gielow (born. March 18, 1945) is an American Republican politician from Wisconsin.

Born in Evansville, Indiana, Gielow received his degree in pharmacy from St. Louis College of Pharmacy and his masters from Washington University in St. Louis.

Gielow served in the Wisconsin State Assembly 2003–2007. In 2010, Gielow was elected mayor of Mequon, Wisconsin and had served on the Mequon Common Council. As mayor of Mequon, Gielow began lifting some bans on building and changed some zoning laws to allow more commerce and thus, more business tax base, which in some cases was considered controversial. In the Wisconsin Spring Election April 2013, Gielow was defeated for reelection for Mayor of Mequon by Dan Abendroth.

After service in the Wisconsin Legilsature, Gielow served Concordia University Wisconsin as the Executive Dean of the School of Pharmacy. From July 2013 until the end of 2018 he served as Vice President of Administration and Chief Campus Officer at Concordia University Ann Arbor.

Since 2022 Gielow has been serving as a director of CU Ventures, an early-stage seed investor network in Wisconsin and is co-developing a venture fund known as The Talents Fund as a general partner.
