= Elizabeth Birr Moje =

Academic specializing in language and literacy education

- Other name: Elizabeth Moje

Academic background
- Education: Concordia University Ann Arbor (BA); Eastern Michigan University (MA); Purdue University (PhD)
- Thesis: Using literacy to learn chemistry: An ethnography of a high school chemistry classroom (1994)

Elizabeth Birr Moje is an American academic specializing in language and literacy education. She is the George Herbert Mead Collegiate Professor of Education and the Arthur F. Thurnau Professor of Literacy, Language, and Culture at the University of Michigan.

== Education ==
Moje received her B.A. from Concordia University Ann Arbor in 1983 and her M.A. from Eastern Michigan University in 1990. From 1983 until 1988 she taught high school at schools in Denver, Colorado; Farmington Hills, Michigan; and Willow Run, Michigan. She taught adult literacy at an automotive plant in Milan, Michigan from 1988-1900 while also working on a Master's degree in Reading and Literacy and K-12 Reading Specialist endorsement. Her high school teacher career centered on teaching science, history, and serving as the director of drama. She earned her Ph.D. from Purdue University in 1994.

== Career ==
From 1994 until 1997 Moje was an assistant professor at the University of Utah. She then moved to the University of Michigan where she was named the Arthur F. Thurnau Professor of Literacy, Language, and Culture in 2004. Moje served as Associate Dean for Research and Community Engagement of what is now the Marsal Family School of Education at the University of Michigan from 2010 to 2016. In 2016 she was named the dean and George Herbert Mead Collegiate Professor of Education. As dean, Moje secured the gift that resulted in the University Regents re-naming the school in honor of the Marsal Family.

During her deanship, Moje also co-founded a Detroit partnership that led to the establishment of the Marygrove Learning Community in northwest Detroit neighborhood, secured a gift to establish the Eileen Lappin Weiser Center for the Learning Sciences, and supported the launch of a new Bachelor's degree program in the school, focused on Learning, Equity, and Problem-Solving for the Public Good (LEAPS). The university also approved first-year year admission to the Educator Preparation Program, establishing for the first time a four-year degree program focused on preparing teachers.

== Selected publications ==
- Lewis, Cynthia; Enciso, Patricia; Moje, Elizabeth B. (2007). Reframing Sociocultural Research on Literacy. Mahwah, N.J: Routledge. ISBN 978-0-8058-5696-5. OCLC 76794774.
- Birr Moje, Elizabeth; Overby, Melanie; Tysvaer, Nicole; Morris, Karen (2008-04-01). "The Complex World of Adolescent Literacy: Myths, Motivations, and Mysteries". Harvard Educational Review. 78 (1): 107–154. doi:10.17763/haer.78.1.54468j6204x24157. ISSN 0017-8055. PMC 2743424. PMID 19756223.
- Moje, Elizabeth Birr (2015-06-01). "Doing and Teaching Disciplinary Literacy with Adolescent Learners: A Social and Cultural Enterprise". Harvard Educational Review. 85 (2): 254–278. doi:10.17763/0017-8055.85.2.254. ISSN 1943-5045.
- Moje, Elizabeth Birr (January 2022). "Remaking Research Tools: Toward Transforming Systems of Inequality through Social Science Research". Socius: Sociological Research for a Dynamic World. 8: 237802312210816. doi:10.1177/23780231221081694. ISSN 2378-0231.
- Moje, Elizabeth Birr; Afflerbach, Peter P.; Enciso, Patricia; Lesaux, Nonie K (2011-03-17). Handbook of Reading Research. Vol. IV. Routledge. pp. 312–345. doi:10.4324/9780203840412-22. ISBN 978-0-203-84041-2.

== Honors and awards ==
In 2012 Moje was elected as a fellow to the American Educational Research Association. In 2014 Moje was appointed to the National Academy of Education, and in 2018 she was inducted into the Reading Hall of Fame. Moje was the 2022 recipient of the Oscar S. Causey Award., in 2023, she was awarded the Senior Scholar Award by the National Council of Research on Language and Literacy (NCRLL), and 2024, Moje received the John J. Gumperz Memorial Lifetime Achievement Award from the Language & Social Processes SIG of the American Educational Research Association (AERA). Moje has also been awarded Crain's Detroit 2019 Notable Women in Education Leadership and Crain's Detroit Business 2023 Notable Leaders in Higher Education. In 2010 The National Writing Project conducted an annotated bibliography for Moje, recognizing her contributions to the field of content area literacy.
