= H. H. Bonniwell =

American politician (1860–1935)

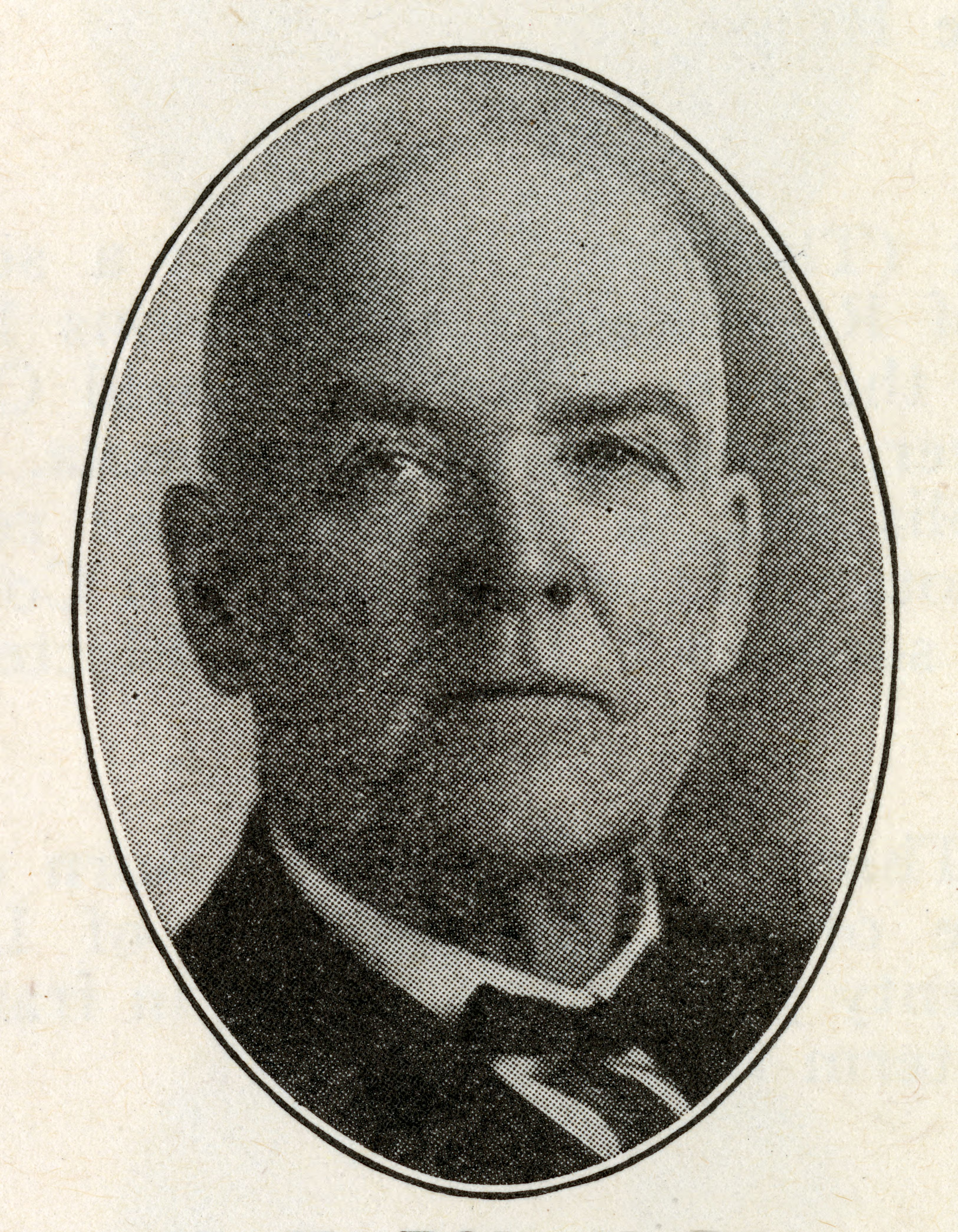
- Bonniwell in 1935

Member of the Minnesota Senate from the 22nd district
- In office January 4, 1915 – April 28, 1935

Personal details
- Born: May 13, 1860 Mequon, Wisconsin, U.S.
- Died: April 28, 1935 (aged 74)
- Resting place: Oakland Cemetery, Hutchinson, Minnesota, U.S.
- Spouse: Mary Frankenfield (m. 1894)
- Children: 2
- Parent: William T. Bonniwell Jr. (father)
- Education: University of Minnesota; University of Michigan (LLB)
- Occupation: Politician

H. H. Bonniwell (May 13, 1860 – April 28, 1935) was a member of the Minnesota Senate.

== Biography ==
Bonniwell was born on May 13, 1860, in Mequon, Wisconsin. His father, William T. Bonniwell Jr., also served in the Senate, as well as the Wisconsin State Assembly and the Minnesota House of Representatives. Bonniwell died on April 28, 1935, and is buried in Hutchinson, Minnesota.

== Career ==
Bonniwell was a member of the Senate from 1915 to 1935. Additionally, he was a delegate to the 1912 Democratic National Convention.
