= William T. Bonniwell Jr. =

American politician (1836–1889)

William Theophilus Bonniwell Jr. (1836–1889) was a member of the Wisconsin State Assembly, the Minnesota Senate and the Minnesota House of Representatives.

== Biography ==
Bonniwell was born on August 10, 1836, in New York City. He moved with his parents to Milwaukee County, Wisconsin, in 1839. From 1850 to 1852, he took part in the California Gold Rush. In 1866, he moved to Hutchinson, Minnesota.

Bonniwell's son, H. H. Bonniwell, also served in the Senate.

== Political career ==
Bonniwell was a member of the Assembly from 1864 to 1865. He was later a member of the Senate in 1871 and again from 1878 to 1882 and of the House of Representatives in 1877. A Democrat, Bonniwell was affiliated with the War Democrats during his tenure in the Assembly.
