= Mequon, Wisconsin =

City in Ozaukee County, Wisconsin

- City
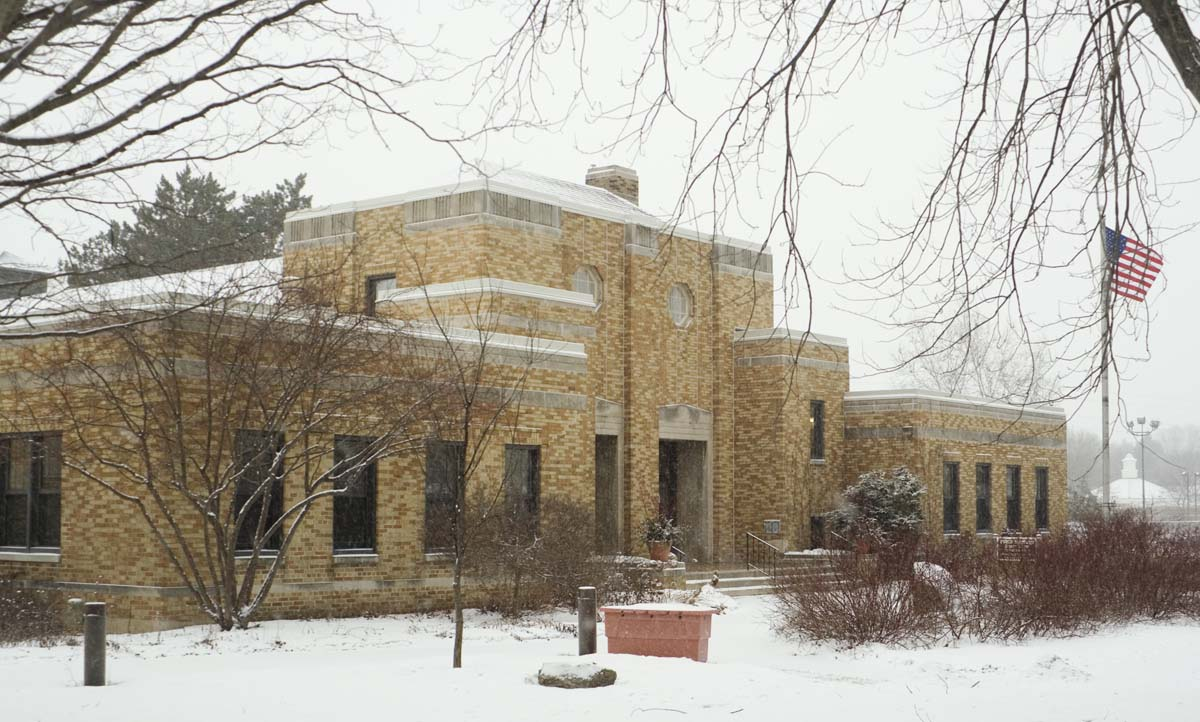
- Mequon City Hall, listed on the National Register of Historic Places

- Location of Mequon in Ozaukee County, Wisconsin.

- Location within Wisconsin Location within the United States
- Coordinates: 43°13′27″N 87°57′36″W
- Country: United States
- State: Wisconsin
- County: Ozaukee
- Settled: 1830s
- Incorporated: 1957; 69 years ago

Government
  - Type: Mayor-council
  - Mayor: Andrew Nerbun
  - Administrator: William Jones
  - Clerk: Caroline Fochs
  - Common council: Aldermen: Robert Strzelczyk; Kelly Tolocko; Dale Mayr; Jeffrey Hansher; Gregg Bach; Brian Parrish; Peter Bratt; Bill Gebhardt

Area
  - Total: 46.96 sq mi (121.63 km^{2})
  - Land: 46.28 sq mi (119.87 km^{2})
  - Water: 0.68 sq mi (1.76 km^{2})
- Elevation: 669 ft (204 m)

Population (2020)
  - Total: 25,142
  - Density: 526.8/sq mi (203.41/km^{2})
- Time zone: UTC−6 (Central (CST))
  - Summer (DST): UTC−5 (CDT)
- ZIP code: 53053, 53092 and 53097
- Area code: 262
- FIPS code: 55-51150
- GNIS feature ID: 1569354
- Website: www.cityofmequonwi.gov

Mequon (/ˈmɛkwɒn/) is the most populous city in Ozaukee County, Wisconsin, United States. The population was 25,142 at the 2020 census. Located on Lake Michigan's western shore with significant commercial developments along Interstate 43, the community is a suburb in the Milwaukee metropolitan area. Despite being the third-largest city in Wisconsin by land area, approximately half of Mequon's land is undeveloped, and agriculture plays a significant role in the local economy.

When the first white settlers arrived in the 1830s, the Mequon area was inhabited by the Menominee, Potawatomi, and Sauk people. In the 1840s, German immigrants settled in the community, building farms and hydropowered mills along the Milwaukee River. Much of the community remained rural, while Thiensville developed as a market town along the local railway, providing services to the farmers. Thiensville incorporated as a village in 1910. Mequon remained rural in the early 20th century but experienced significant population growth during the suburbanization that followed World War II. The community incorporated as a city in 1957 to avoid annexation by the City of Milwaukee. The City of Mequon completely surrounds Thiensville, leading some residents to call Thiensville "Mequon's donut hole." The two municipalities have a close relationship, with a shared chamber of commerce, library, and school district.

Lutheranism has played a significant role in Mequon since the community's early years. Some of the first German settlers were Old Lutherans who founded the Freistadt community—now a neighborhood in western Mequon—in 1839 and went on to form the first Lutheran congregation in Wisconsin. In the 21st century, there are more Lutheran churches in Mequon than churches of any other single denomination. Additionally, Mequon is home to two private Lutheran post-secondary institutions: Concordia University Wisconsin and Wisconsin Lutheran Seminary. In addition to having other Christian denominations, Mequon is also the northernmost of Milwaukee's suburbs to have a sizable Jewish community.

== Toponymy ==
"Mequon" may have come from the Ojibwe word "Emikwaan" or "Miguan", meaning ladle, referring to the shape of the river in the area. Alternatively, the name may come from a Menominee word Mēkon, meaning "feather."

== History ==
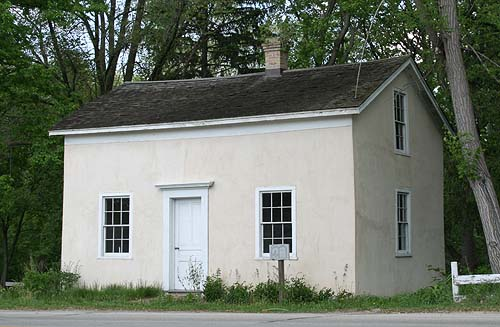
The 1839 Isham Day House is now a museum located in Settlers Park.

The area was originally inhabited by Native Americans, including the Menominee, Potawatomi, and Sauk people. In the early 19th century, the Potawatomi had a village in present-day Thiensville located on Pigeon Creek, north of Freistadt Road. In 1832, the Menominee surrendered the land between the Milwaukee River and Lake Michigan to the United States Federal Government through the Treaty of Washington. The Potawatomi surrendered the area of Mequon west of the Milwaukee River in 1833 through the 1833 Treaty of Chicago, which (after being ratified in 1835) required them to leave the area by 1838. While many Native people moved west of the Mississippi River to Kansas, some chose to remain, and were referred to as "strolling Potawatomi" in contemporary documents because many of them were migrants who subsisted by squatting on their ancestral lands, which were now owned by white settlers. Eventually the Potawatomi who evaded forced removal gathered in northern Wisconsin, where they formed the Forest County Potawatomi Community.

European trappers, explorers, and traders used the Milwaukee River through the middle of what is now Mequon as a means of transportation. The first permanent white settlers arrived in the mid-1830s from New York, England, and Ireland. One of the first settlers was John Weston, who settled near present-day Thiensville in 1837 and served as the first postmaster of the Town of Mequon. One of the oldest surviving buildings from this period is the Isham Day House, constructed in 1839 on the west bank of the river. The first Germans arrived in 1839, and in the 1840s Germans became the largest ethnic group in Mequon and Ozaukee County.

=== Freistadt ===
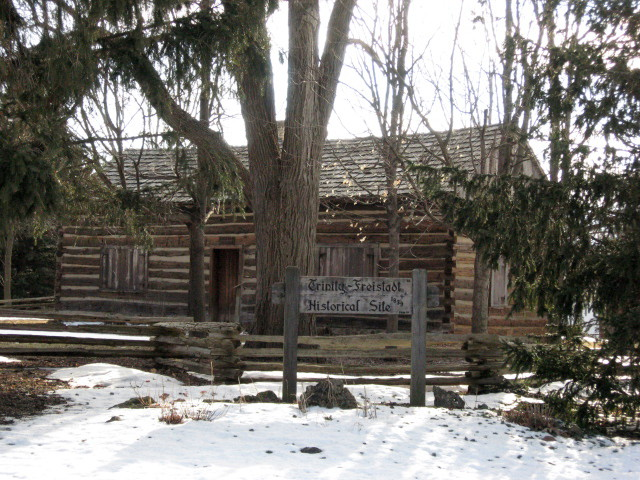
While Trinity Lutheran Church of Freistadt moved to a stone church in 1884, a reconstruction of the original log structure stands at the Trinity-Freistadt Historic Site.

In October 1839, a party of twenty German families from Pomerania, Prussia, settled the Freistadt community in the western part of the Town of Mequon. They were Old Lutherans who had resisted the Prussian government's attempts to take control over the Protestant churches through the Prussian Union of Churches. In German, "Freistadt" ([ˈfʁaɪʃtat]) means "Free City".

In 1840, they built a log cabin church, which they named Trinity Lutheran Church. It was the first Lutheran church in Wisconsin. In 1845, what would become the Lutheran Synod of Buffalo was organized in Freistadt. However, the Freistadt church became a part of the Lutheran Church–Missouri Synod in 1848. The wooden church was replaced with a limestone building in 1884.

=== Thiensville ===
Joachim Heinrich Thien moved to the area in 1842 from Oldenburg, Prussia, and helped design a plan for the settlement that would become Thiensville. A year later he employed a group of Native American laborers to construct a dam and a canal. He then built a sawmill and a store. Thien hosted the first town meeting for the Town of Mequon in 1846, and in 1857 he established the volunteer fire department and served as its first captain.

Thien was a freethinker, as were many of the early German settlers. The influence of the freethinker societies kept formal churches out of the village until 1919, when St. Cecilia Catholic Church was built.

Thiensville grew in part because of its location on the Chicago, Milwaukee & St. Paul Railway, which was constructed in the early 1870s. In the late 19th and early 20th centuries, Thiensville was one of the most concentrated communities in the Town of Mequon. While most of Mequon was quite rural, Theinsville functioned as a downtown area with stores, mills, and professional services. The village of Thiensville incorporated in 1910.

In 1945, eighty German prisoners of war from Camp Fredonia in Little Kohler, Wisconsin were contracted to work at the Herbert A. Nieman Canning Company in the village to make up for the loss of labor due to local men fighting in World War II. German prisoners from Camp Rockfield in Rockfield, Wisconsin, (located in present-day Germantown) also worked at the Fromm Bros., Nieman & Co. Fox Ranch in northern Mequon.

In the 20th century, Mequon and the village of Thiensville developed a close relationship, with a shared school district, chamber of commerce, and library.

=== City of Mequon ===
The Town of Mequon experienced significant population growth during the suburbanization that followed World War II. Between 1950 and 1960, the population increased by roughly 110%, from 4,065 to 8,543. With growth came the risk that municipalities such as Thiensville or Milwaukee would try to annex land from the Town of Mequon, as happened to the Milwaukee County's Town of Lake in 1954 and Town of Granville in 1956. With a 1957 population of about 7,500, Mequon incorporated as a city under the terms of Wisconsin statute 66.0215, also known as "The Oak Creek Law," which had been crafted to prevent suburban towns from being annexed by other municipalities.

According to Tougaloo College's Historical Database of Sundown Towns, Mequon was probably a sundown town until 1954 when Milwaukee Braves right fielder Hank Aaron moved his family to the community. Aaron could not buy his home directly from its builder and instead had to engage a friend to buy it on his behalf.

The city continued to grow with the construction of Interstate 43 in the mid-1960s, making travel to Milwaukee easier. Despite being a city, much of Mequon remains rural, and nearly half of the land in the community is undeveloped.

== Geography ==
Mequon is located at 43°13′27″N 87°57′36″W (43.224243, −87.960094), approximately 15 miles (24 km) north of Milwaukee and is part of the Milwaukee metropolitan area. According to the United States Census Bureau, the city has a total area of 48.77 square miles (126.31 km^{2}), of which 46.28 square miles (119.86 km^{2}) is land and 2.49 square miles (6.45 km^{2}) is water. As of 2005, Mequon was the third-largest city in terms of land area in the state of Wisconsin. Though much of the population lives in residential areas, approximately half of the land within the city's boundaries is undeveloped or farmed.

The Village of Thiensville is an enclave in central Mequon. The city is also bordered by the Town of Cedarburg, City of Cedarburg, and Town of Grafton to the north; Lake Michigan to the east; the Village of Bayside, Village of River Hills, Village of Brown Deer, and City of Milwaukee to the south; and the Village of Germantown to the west.

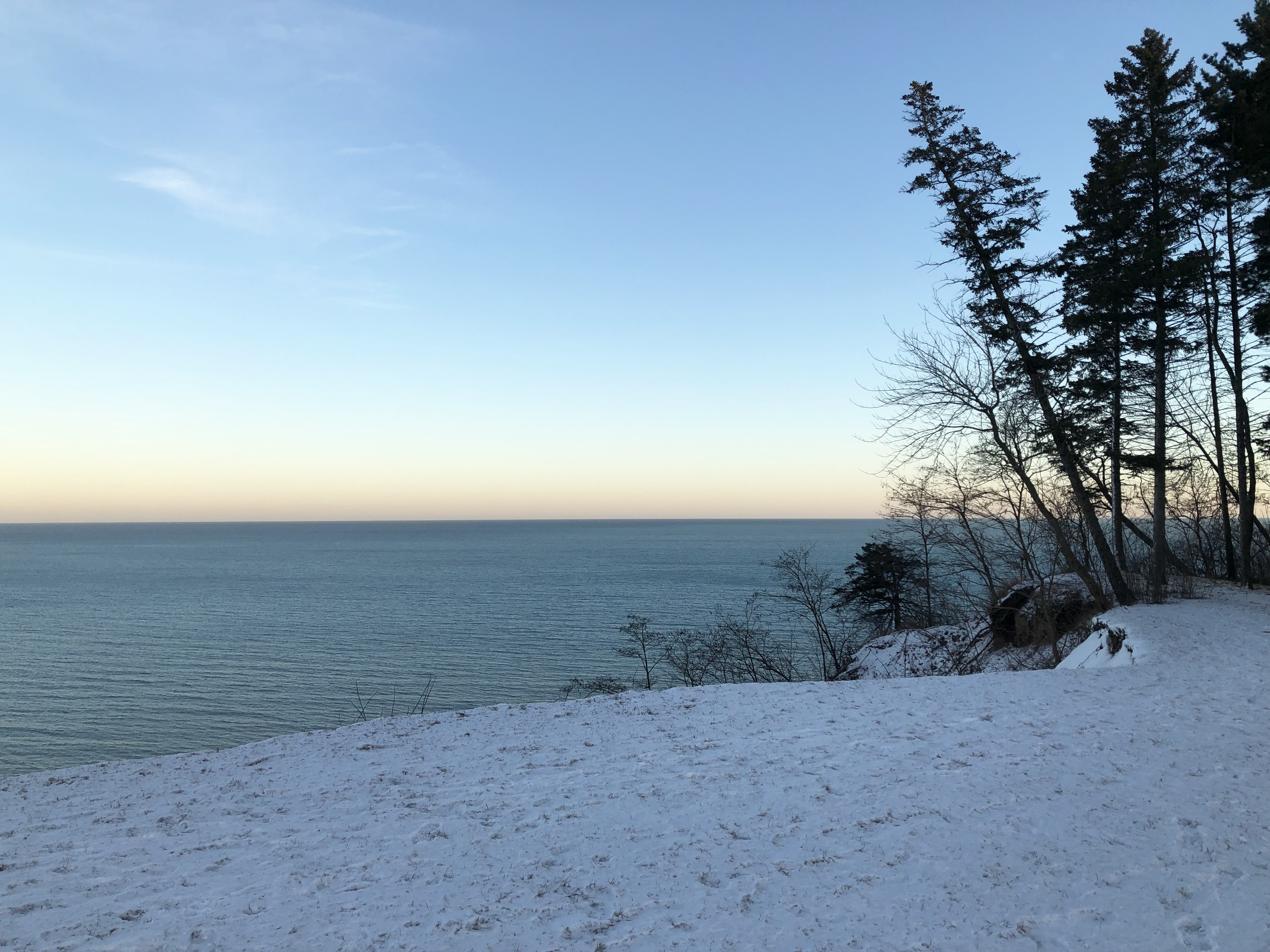
The clay bluffs in Virmond Park along Lake Michigan

The city is located on the western shore of Lake Michigan, and the coastline is characterized by clay bluffs ranging from 80 to 140 feet (24 to 43 meters) in height with deep ravines where streams flow into the lake. Clay bluffs are a geological formation characteristic of the Lake Michigan shoreline, and are found in few other areas of the world. Much of the coast has mixed gravel and sand beaches.

The city is located in the Southeastern Wisconsin glacial till plains that were created by the Wisconsin glaciation during the most recent ice age. The soil is clayey glacial till with a thin layer of loess on the surface. The city has some limestone deposits, including the Devonian Thiensville formation in north-central Mequon and the Silurian Little Menomonee River Reef District, which contains dolomite marine fossils. The Wisconsin Department of Natural Resources considers the eastern part of the city along the lake to be in the Central Lake Michigan Coastal ecological landscape, while the western part of the city is in the Southern Lake Michigan Coastal ecological landscape.

The Milwaukee River and its tributary Pigeon Creek flow through the eastern part of the city. Little Menomonee Creek and the Little Menomonee River, which are tributaries of the Menomonee River, flow through western Mequon.

Before white settlers arrived in the area, Mequon was an upland forest dominated by American beech and sugar maple trees. There is also a large tamarack swamp along the Little Menomonee River. Much of the original forest was cleared to prepare the land for agriculture.

As land development continues to reduce wild areas, wildlife is forced into closer proximity with human communities like Mequon. Large mammals, including white-tailed deer, coyotes, and red foxes can be seen in the city. Many birds, including chimney swifts, great blue herons, and wild turkeys are found in the city. The city is also home to many rare and notable species, including the state-designated endangered pinedrops and heartleaf plantain; threatened forked aster, snow trillium, and yellow gentian; as well as American gromwell and twinleaf, which are state-designated special concern plant species.

The region struggles with many invasive species, including the emerald ash borer, common carp, reed canary grass, the common reed, purple loosestrife, garlic mustard, Eurasian buckthorns, and honeysuckles.

=== Climate ===
Mequon experiences four distinct seasons, with variation in precipitation and temperature being very wide. The warmest month of the year tends to be July, when the high temperature averages 81 °F (27 °C), with low temperatures of approximately 59 °F (15 °C). January is the coldest month in Mequon, with average high temperatures averaging only 27 °F (−3 °C), and lows averaging 11 °F (−12 °C). The highest temperature ever recorded in Mequon was 105 °F (41 °C) on July 24, 1935, and again on July 17, 1995. The coldest temperature ever recorded in the city was −40 °F (−40 °C), on January 17, 1982, also known as Cold Sunday.

Climate data for Mequon, Wisconsin
Month	Jan	Feb	Mar	Apr	May	Jun	Jul	Aug	Sep	Oct	Nov	Dec	Year
Mean daily maximum °F (°C)	27 (−3)	31 (−1)	42 (6)	55 (13)	66 (19)	76 (24)	81 (27)	79 (26)	72 (22)	59 (15)	45 (7)	31 (−1)	55 (13)
Mean daily minimum °F (°C)	11 (−12)	14 (−10)	24 (−4)	35 (2)	44 (7)	54 (12)	59 (15)	57 (14)	49 (9)	38 (3)	28 (−2)	16 (−9)	36 (2)
Average precipitation inches (mm)	1.60 (41)	1.50 (38)	1.90 (48)	3.66 (93)	3.66 (93)	4.11 (104)	4.06 (103)	4.11 (104)	3.52 (89)	2.65 (67)	2.47 (63)	1.72 (44)	34.96 (887)
Source: The Weather Channel

== Demographics ==
Historical population
Census	Pop.	Note	%±
1940	3,068		—
1950	4,065		32.5%
1960	8,543		110.2%
1970	15,150		77.3%
1980	16,193		6.9%
1990	18,885		16.6%
2000	21,823		15.6%
2010	23,132		6.0%
2020	25,142		8.7%
U.S. Decennial Census

=== 2020 census ===
As of the 2020 census, Mequon had a population of 25,142. The median age was 46.4 years. 20.9% of residents were under the age of 18 and 23.8% of residents were 65 years of age or older. For every 100 females there were 93.1 males, and for every 100 females age 18 and over there were 89.6 males age 18 and over.

86.7% of residents lived in urban areas, while 13.3% lived in rural areas.

There were 9,364 households in Mequon, of which 29.0% had children under the age of 18 living in them. Of all households, 66.3% were married-couple households, 10.9% were households with a male householder and no spouse or partner present, and 19.5% were households with a female householder and no spouse or partner present. About 22.6% of all households were made up of individuals and 14.5% had someone living alone who was 65 years of age or older.

There were 10,013 housing units, of which 6.5% were vacant. The homeowner vacancy rate was 0.9% and the rental vacancy rate was 12.6%.

Racial composition as of the 2020 census
Race	Number	Percent
White	21,545	85.7%
Black or African American	772	3.1%
American Indian and Alaska Native	55	0.2%
Asian	1,191	4.7%
Native Hawaiian and Other Pacific Islander	1	0.0%
Some other race	284	1.1%
Two or more races	1,294	5.1%
Hispanic or Latino (of any race)	876	3.5%

=== 2010 census ===
As of the census of 2010, there were 23,132 people, 8,598 households, and 6,561 families residing in the city. The population density was 499.8 inhabitants per square mile (193.0/km^{2}). There were 9,145 housing units at an average density of 197.6 per square mile (76.3/km^{2}). The racial makeup of the city was 92.0% White, 2.8% African American, 0.1% Native American, 3.6% Asian, 0.3% from other races, and 1.2% from two or more races. Hispanic or Latino of any race were 2.0% of the population.

There were 8,598 households, of which 32.4% had children under the age of 18 living with them, 68.9% were married couples living together, 5.1% had a female householder with no husband present, 2.4% had a male householder with no wife present, and 23.7% were non-families. 20.3% of all households were made up of individuals, and 11.3% had someone living alone who was 65 years of age or older. The average household size was 2.56 and the average family size was 2.97.

The median age in the city was 45.9 years. 23.1% of residents were under the age of 18; 9.2% were between the ages of 18 and 24; 16.2% were from 25 to 44; 34.1% were from 45 to 64; and 17.3% were 65 years of age or older. The gender makeup of the city was 48.6% male and 51.4% female.

U.S. Census Bureau estimated the median income for a household in the city in 2009–2011 to be $106,647, and the median income for a family to be $124,422. The per capita income for the city estimated at $64,530. About 1.2% of families and 3.2% of the population were below the poverty line, including 1.2% of those under age 18 and 3.4% of those age 65 or over. During the same period, the median household value for Mequon was estimated at $357,200.

=== 2000 census ===
As of the census of 2000, there were 21,823 people, 7,861 households, and 6,406 families residing in the city. The population density was 472.5 people per square mile (182.5/km^{2}). There were 8,162 housing units at an average density of 176.7 per square mile (68.2/km^{2}). The racial makeup of the city was 94.16% White, 2.25% African American, 0.10% Native American, 2.39% Asian, 0.03% Pacific Islander, 0.23% from other races, and 0.83% from two or more races. Hispanic or Latino of any race were 1.20% of the population.

There were 7,861 households, out of which 38.0% had children under the age of 18 living with them, 74.8% were married couples living together, 4.8% had a female householder with no husband present, and 18.5% were non-families. 16.1% of all households were made up of individuals, and 7.4% had someone living alone who was 65 years of age or older. The average household size was 2.75 and the average family size was 3.09.

In the city, the population was spread out, with 28.1% under the age of 18, 4.2% from 18 to 24, 22.9% from 25 to 44, 31.2% from 45 to 64, and 13.6% who were 65 years of age or older. The median age was 42 years. For every 100 females, there were 97.4 males. For every 100 females age 18 and over, there were 93.8 males.

The median income for a household in the city was $90,733, and the median income for a family was $101,793 (These figures had risen to $97,797 and $113,265, respectively, as of a 2007 estimate). Males had a median income of $72,762 versus $40,280 for females. The per capita income for the city was $48,333. About 1.3% of families and 1.7% of the population were below the poverty line, including 1.2% of those under age 18 and 2.7% of those age 65 or over.

== Economy ==
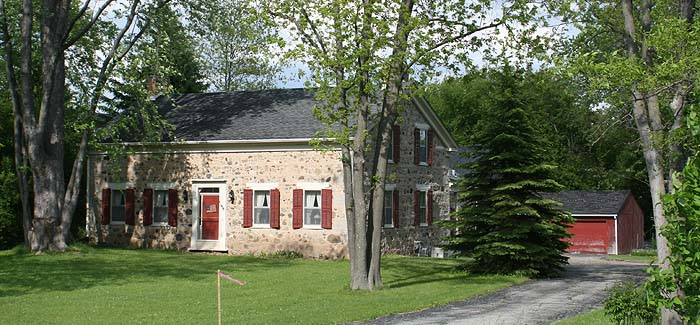
Located in rural northwest Mequon, the O'Brien-Peuschel Farmstead was settled in 1846 and has extant buildings dating to as early as 1850. It is listed on the National Register of Historic Places.

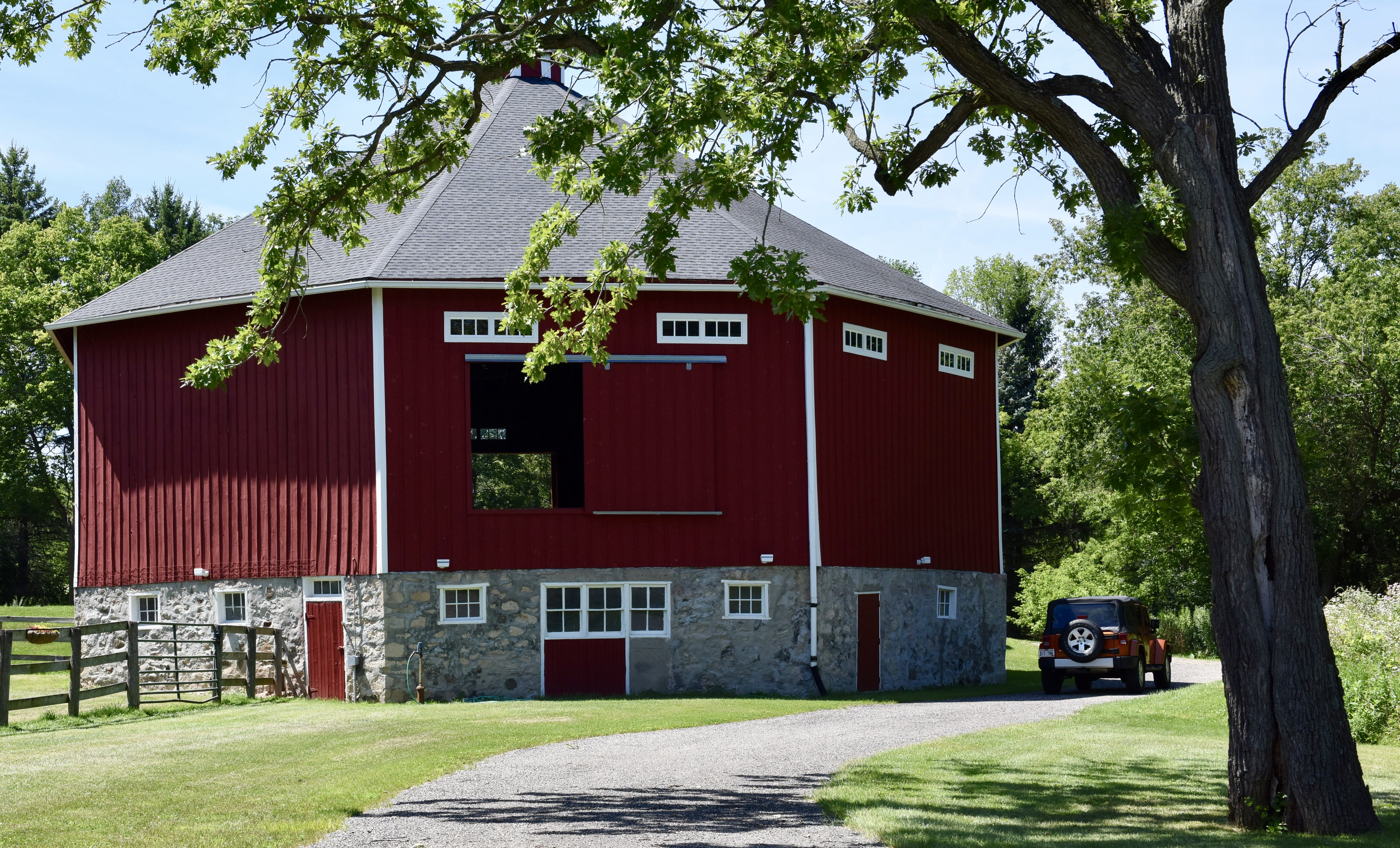
Farmers in eastern Mequon built octagonal barns, believing the shape to be better suited to the winds coming off nearby Lake Michigan. The 1891 Frank Vocke barn is a surviving example of these once-common barns.

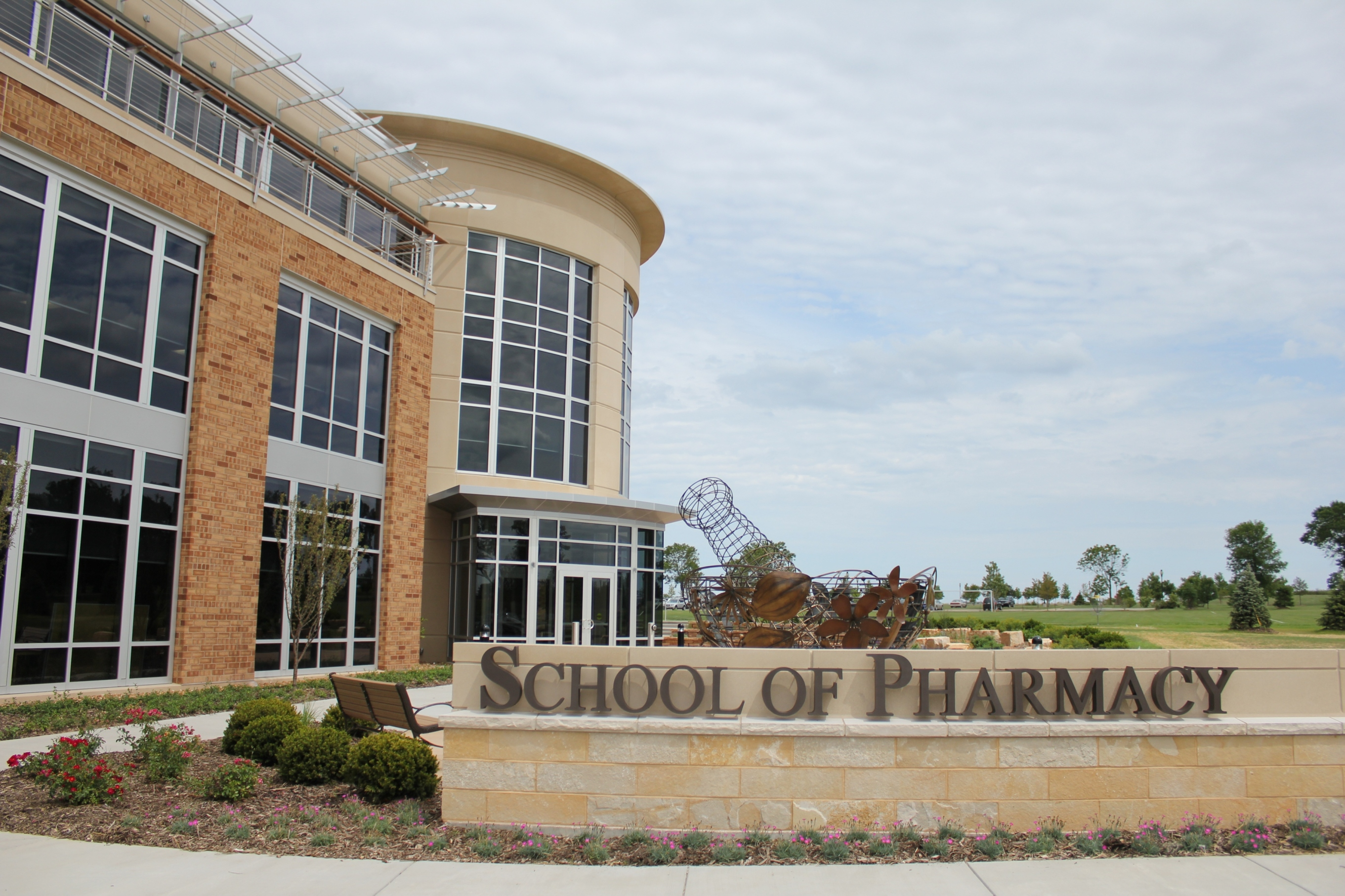
Concordia University Wisconsin's School of Pharmacy in Mequon.

Mequon's economy was primarily agricultural. Some farmsteads from as early as the 1840s and 1850s still stand in the community and are listed on the National Register of Historic Places. The first major businesses were hydropowered mills on the Milwaukee River and other businesses that served local farmers, many of which concentrated in Thiensville.

Beginning in the 1920s, the Nieman and Fromm families began fur farming silver foxes in Mequon. Several companies, including Fromm Bros., Nieman & Co.; Federal Silver Fox Farms, Inc.; Ozaukee Fur Farms Co.; Herbert A. Nieman & Co.; and Cedarburg Fox Farms, Inc. all began operating in Mequon and southern Cedarburg in the 1920s. In 1928, 6,600 of the 8,841 pelts sold by the New York Auction Co. came from the Fromm and Nieman operations in Wisconsin for a record-breaking sum of $1,021,000. In 1929, the Nieman and Fromm operations broke their own record with auction sales of $1,331,679, making them a leader in the national fur industry. By 1937, the farms were selling 30,000 pelts per year. After World War II, changing consumer tastes caused the farms to begin breeding mink in addition to silver fox. Fur sales declined later in the 20th century, and the Mequon farms sold their last pelts in 1985.

The mid-to-late 20th century saw diversification in Mequon's economy. Retail stores opened to serve the increasingly suburban community, and manufacturers opened plants. In 1983, Concordia University Wisconsin moved from its campus in Milwaukee to a newly acquired campus in Mequon. In 1994, St. Mary's Hospital Ozaukee opened. As of 2015, the two institutions—both located in close proximity to Interstate 43—were among the largest employers in Ozaukee County. Despite the growth of new industries, half of Mequon's land remains undeveloped and agriculture continues to play a significant role in the local economy.

Largest Employers in Mequon, 2015
Rank	Employer	Industry	Employees
1	Concordia University Wisconsin	Higher education	500+
2	Rockwell Automation	Industrial Automation	500+
3	Ascension Columbia St. Mary's Hospital Ozaukee	Health care	500+
4	Mequon-Thiensville School District	Primary and secondary education	250–499
5	Dentaquest LLC	Health insurance	250–499
6	Telsmith Inc.	Construction machinery manufacturing	250–499
7	Roundy's	Grocery (retail)	100–249
8	Hayes Performance Systems	Disc brake manufacturing	100–249
9	Aurora Health Care	Health care	100–249
10	Newcastle Place	Retirement community	100–249

== Culture ==
=== Libraries ===
The Frank L. Weyenberg Library is a public library serving Mequon and Thiensville. In addition to its collection of physical media, the library provides patrons with digital resources and meeting space. In 2018, the library made 307,796 loans to patrons. The library is a member of the Monarch Library System, comprising thirty-one libraries in Ozaukee, Sheboygan, Washington, and Dodge counties.

The Rincker Memorial Library at Concordia University Wisconsin is a private research library with a collection of over 100,000 physical books and 400 scholarly journals. The Rinker library also has access to an additional 150,000 eBooks and 50,000 electronic periodicals. The university's Arnold H. and Vern L. Moeller Rare Books Room contains a collection of over 300 items dating from the 15th through 19th centuries, primarily related to the historical development of Lutheranism, including texts by Augustine of Hippo, Francis Bacon, Martin Luther and Philipp Melanchthon.

Wisconsin Lutheran Seminary hosts a private library of primarily theological materials, containing over 50,000 print books and an archive of over 400 publications from a variety of Christian denominations. The seminary owns a collection of rare antique books dating to the 16th through 18th centuries by theologians including Johann Wilhelm Baier, Abraham Calovius, Martin Chemnitz, Johann Gerhard and Martin Luther. The oldest item in the collection is a 1487 edition of a commentary by Nicholas of Lyra.

=== Museums ===
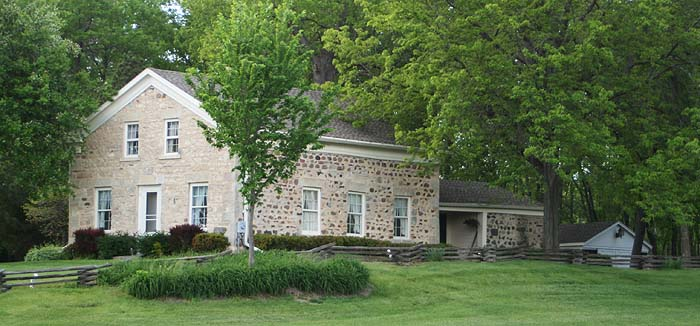
The Jonathan Clark House Museum in northern Mequon is listed on the National Register of Historic Places.

- Jonathan Clark House Museum: Built in 1848 by an early Yankee settler from Vermont, the Jonathan Clark House has been restored and furnished to reflect what life was like for Mequon's settlers in the period from 1840 to 1860.
- Postal Museum: Housed in the 1839 Isham Day House on the west bank of the Milwaukee River, the Mequon-Thiensville Historical Society maintains the building as a replica of a 19th-century post office and also displays a stamp collection. The museum opened to the public in 2019 for one day per week over the summer months. Admission is free.

=== Performing arts ===
- Acacia Theatre Company: The nondenominational Christian theater company has been based out of the Todd Wehr Auditorium at Concordia University Wisconsin since its 2002–2003 season.
- Marcus North Shore Cinema: The Marcus Corporation operates an eleven-auditorium multiplex movie theater in Mequon with a bar and restaurant.

=== Religion ===
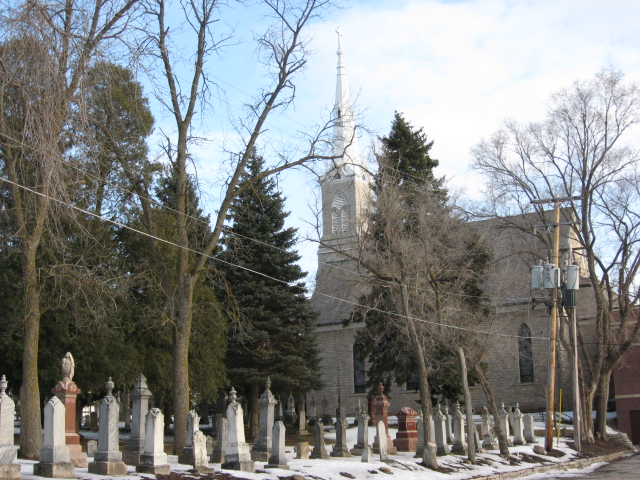
Trinity Lutheran Church of Freistadt's current building was constructed in 1884 to replace an older wooden structure.

Lutheranism has played an important role in Mequon since the community's earliest years. In 1840, a group of Old Lutheran immigrants from Prussia established Trinity Lutheran Church of Freistadt, the first Lutheran congregation in Wisconsin. In 1845, the Lutheran Synod of Buffalo, one of the predecessor organizations of the modern Evangelical Lutheran Church in America (ELCA), formed in Freistadt.

As of 2020, four churches—Christ Alone Evangelical; Christ Alone Evangelical, North Campus; St. John's Evangelical; and Trinity (West Mequon)—are affiliated with the Wisconsin Evangelical Lutheran Synod (WELS). Christ Alone Evangelical Lutheran Church also operates a school serving students from kindergarten through eighth grade, and the WELS-affiliated Wisconsin Lutheran Seminary is a men's post-secondary educational institution that trains pastors for the synod.

Beautiful Savior Lutheran and Trinity Lutheran (Freistadt) are affiliated with the Lutheran Church–Missouri Synod. Trinity (Freistadt) also operates a private school for students from kindergarten through eighth grade, and the Missouri Synod operates Concordia University Wisconsin, one of eight campuses in its Concordia University System.

Grace Lutheran Church in Thiensville is affiliated with the mainline Protestant ELCA. Other mainline Protestant congregations include the Presbyterian Church (USA)-affiliated Crossroads Presbyterian, Mequon United Methodist Church, and St. Boniface Episcopal Church.

The evangelical Protestant churches in Mequon include Alliance Bible Church, Christ Church, the evangelical Presbyterian Grace 242, and Vessels of Honor. Additionally, two Pentecostal congregations—Christian Life Church and the Assemblies of God-affiliated Restoration Church—are located in the city. The Jehovah's Witnesses also have a Kingdom Hall in Mequon.

There once were two Catholic Churches in the Mequon area: St. Cecilia Catholic Church and School in Thiensville and St. James Catholic Church and School in Mequon. The two parishes merged in 1984 to form Lumen Christi Catholic Church, although the church maintained two campuses until September 2016, when a new, larger church and school facility opened to serve all of Mequon's congregants. The parish operates a school for students from kindergarten through eighth grade.

The metro-Milwaukee area's Jewish community is concentrated on Milwaukee's upper east side and in the suburbs north of the city along Lake Michigan. Mequon is the northernmost suburb with a significant Jewish presence. There are two synagogues in Mequon: the Orthodox Congregation Anshai Lebowitz and the Peltz Center for Jewish Life, which is affiliated with the Chabad movement. Additionally, Mequon is home to the Ovation Sarah Chudnow Jewish retirement community; the Blane Goodman Funeral Service, LLC, which claims to be the Milwaukee area's "only Jewish funeral directors;" and a Roundy's Metro Market with extensive kosher options, including Pas Yisroel bakery, Chalav Yisrael dairy, and a kosher fish and meat counter.

Unitarian Church North, a Unitarian Universalist congregation is located in northern Mequon, along Interstate 43.

== Law and government ==
Mequon has had a mayor–council government since its incorporation in 1957. The current mayor is Andrew Nerbun, who was elected to his first three-year term on April 5, 2022. The eight aldermen on the common council also serve three-year terms. The council meets on the second Tuesday of each month in Mequon City Hall at 7:30 p.m. A full-time staff of unelected administrators manage the city's day-to-day operations.

As part of Wisconsin's 6th congressional district, Mequon is represented by Glenn Grothman (R) in the United States House of Representatives, and by Ron Johnson (R) and Tammy Baldwin (D) in the United States Senate. Alberta Darling (R) represents Mequon in the Wisconsin State Senate. Eastern Mequon is part of the Wisconsin State Assembly's 23rd District and is represented by Deb Andraca (D), while western Mequon is part of the 24th District and is represented by Dan Knodl (R).

From	To	Mayor
1957	1965	Carl F. Wilbert
1965	1971	James Egan
1971	1977	Thomas P. Leisle
1977	1980	James Hanley
1980	1986	Lynn Eley
1986	1992	Constance "Connie" Pukaite
1992	1998	James Moriarty
1998	2010	Christine Nuernberg
2010	2013	Curt Gielow
2013	2019	Dan Abendroth
2019	2022	John Wirth
2022	2025	Andrew Nerbun

=== Mequon Fire Department ===
Mequon's fire department was founded in 1933. There are two active fire stations in the community: one serving the east side and the other serving the west side. Fire Chief David Bialk has served with the department since 2006 and oversees a staff of approximately sixty firefighters, EMTs and paramedics.

=== Mequon Police Department ===
The Mequon Police Department was established in 1958 and is located in the City of Mequon Safety Building, which also serves as one of the city's fire stations. Police Chief Mark Riley has served with the department since 1999.

== Education ==
Mequon's public schools are operated by the Mequon-Thiensville School District, except for six square miles (16 km^{2}) in the far northwestern part of Mequon that are served by the Cedarburg School District. The district has three elementary schools, serving grades kindergarten through fifth grade: Donges Bay Elementary, Oriole Lane Elementary, and Wilson Elementary. Each elementary school serves a different neighborhoods of the city. Similarly, the district has two middle schools, each serving students grades six through eight in different areas of the city: Lake Shore Middle School and Steffen Middle School. Homestead High School serves all students grades nine through twelve. In 2009, Homestead was ranked by BusinessWeek magazine as the state's top high school. The school's mascot is a Highlander.

The district also serves the Village of Thiensville. The district is governed by a seven-member elected school board, which meets on the third Monday of each month at 7 p.m. on the campus of Lake Shore Middle School. The district also has a superintendent. Matthew Joynt, the current superintendent, has held the position since 2017.

The city also has parochial schools that serve students from kindergarten through eight grade, including Christ Alone Lutheran School, Lumen Christi Catholic School, and Trinity Lutheran School.

Milwaukee Area Technical College has a satellite campus in Mequon, offering over 20 two-year associate degrees, as well as a variety of technical diplomas and certificates. The Mequon campus can serve as a stepping stone to a bachelor's degree, with some students completing two years of basic education before transferring to a four-year college or university.

Concordia University Wisconsin is a private, co-educational university in eastern Mequon that is part of the Lutheran Church–Missouri Synod's nine-member Concordia University System. The university has a student body of more than 7,000 with over 70 undergraduate majors and minors and 17 graduate programs, including degree programs in CUW's School of Pharmacy, one of only three such schools in the State of Wisconsin.

Wisconsin Lutheran Seminary is also located in Mequon. An all-men's post-secondary theological school with a student body of approximately 125, the seminary trains pastors for the Wisconsin Evangelical Lutheran Synod.

== Health and utilities ==
Mequon and the surrounding communities are served by Ascension Columbia St. Mary's Hospital Ozaukee. When it opened in 1994, it was the only hospital in Ozaukee County. Froedtert & the Medical College of Wisconsin, Aurora Health Care, and Children's Wisconsin all operate clinics with urgent care facilities in Mequon.

The city provides sewage disposal and water supply services for residents.

== Transportation ==
Interstate 43 runs north–south through the City of Mequon with exits 85, 87 and 89 providing access to the municipality.

Mequon has limited public transit compared with larger cities. Ozaukee County and the Milwaukee County Transit System run the Route 143 commuter bus, also known as the "Ozaukee County Express," to Milwaukee via Interstate 43. The bus stops at five locations along Port Washington Road in Mequon, Monday through Friday with limited hours corresponding to peak commute times. Ozaukee County Transit Services' Shared Ride Taxi is the public transit option for traveling to sites not directly accessible from the interstate. The taxis operate seven days a week and make connections to Washington County Transit and Milwaukee County Routes 12, 49 and 42u.

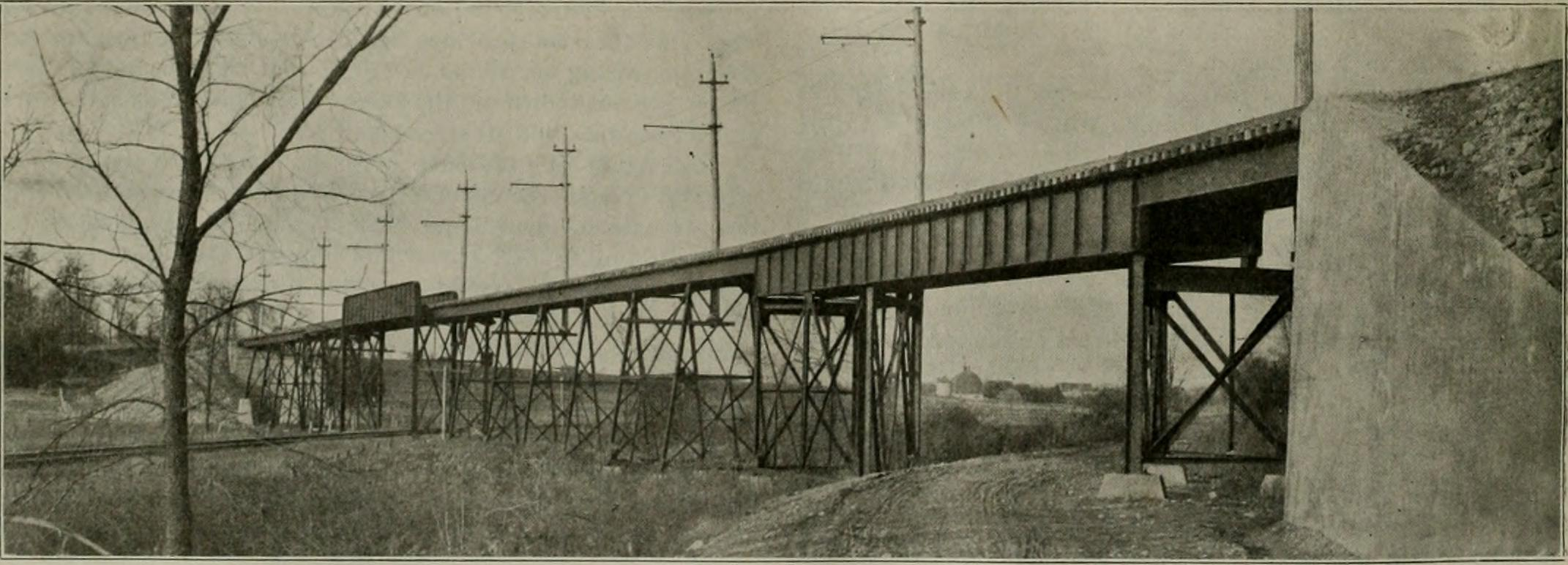
The Milwaukee Interurban Line built a bridge over the Milwaukee Road tracks in northern Mequon near Cedarburg Road, c. 1906. The bridge has been demolished, but some of the concrete footings remain along the Ozaukee Interurban Trail.

Unlike some nearby cities and villages, the City of Mequon has large areas of rural and undeveloped land without sidewalks for pedestrian traffic. However, the Ozaukee Interurban Trail for pedestrian and bicycle use runs north–south through the city and connects Mequon to the neighboring community of Cedarburg in the north and Brown Deer in the south, where the trail connects to Milwaukee County's Oak Leaf Trail. The Ozaukee Interurban Trail continues north to Oostburg in Sheboygan County. The trail was formerly an interurban passenger rail line that ran from Milwaukee to Sheboygan. The train was in operation from 1907 to 1948, when it fell into disuse following World War II. The old rail line was converted into the present recreational trail in the 1990s.

The Wisconsin Central Ltd. railroad, a subsidiary of the Canadian National Railway, operates a freight rail line parallel to the Ozaukee Interurban Trail. The Union Pacific Railroad runs parallel to Interstate 43 in the city. Mequon currently does not have passenger train service.

== Parks and recreation ==
Mequon contains more than two dozen parks and hundreds of acres of community parks and nature preserves operated by the city, and some operated by the county. The Ozaukee Interurban Trail runs for 5.85 miles (9.41 km) south to north through the city. The Mequon-Thiensville Recreation Department conducts classes and programs for children and adults.

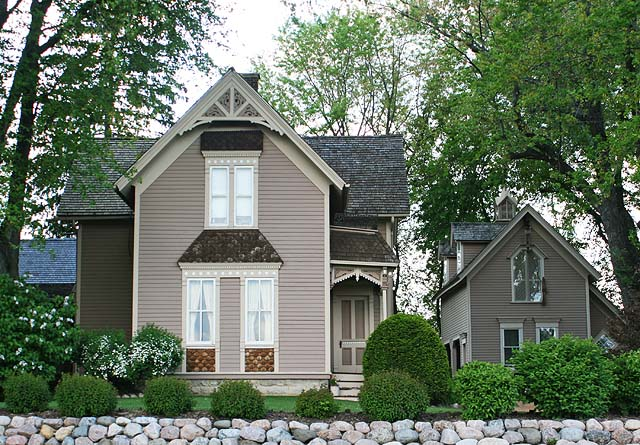
The John Reichert Farmhouse, built in 1885.

=== City parks ===
- Garrison's Glen: 22 acres (8.9 ha). Neighborhood park on Pioneer Road near the Milwaukee River. Contains walking trail and canoe launch.
- Grasslyn Nature Preserve: 15 acres (6.1 ha). Nature preserve in the southeast of the city. Contains a walking trail and prairie area.
- Highland Woods: 85 acres (34 ha). Nature preserve on Green Bay Road north of Thiensville. Contains a walking trail and forest.
- Katherine Kearney Carpenter Park: 35 acres (14 ha). Dog walking park in southeastern Mequon. Contains walking trail.
- Lemke Park: 41 acres (17 ha). Neighborhood park in southwestern Mequon. Contains playground, picnic tables, archery range, soccer fields, volleyball court, baseball diamond.
- Lilly Lane Nature Preserve: 12 acres (4.9 ha). Nature preserve in southern Mequon. Contains walking trail.
- Little Menomonee Site: 20 acres (8.1 ha). Nature preserve in western Mequon, along the Little Menomonee River
- Mequon Community Park: 16 acres (6.5 ha). Community park just south of Thiensville. Contains swimming pool, baseball diamond, picnic area, playground, and access to the Ozaukee Interurban Trail.
- Mequon Nature Preserve: 444 acres (180 ha). Nature preserve in southwestern Mequon, maintained in partnership with the Ozaukee Washington Land Trust. Contains walking trails, education centers, woodland, and observation tower.
- Prinz Site: 10 acres (4.0 ha). Nature preserve north of Thiensville.
- River Barn Park: 37 acres (15 ha). Community park in southern Mequon along the Milwaukee River. Contains baseball, soccer, and football fields and a playground.
- River Forest Nature Preserve: 62 acres (25 ha). Nature preserve in central Mequon along the Milwaukee River. Contains walking trail.
- Riverview Park: 20 acres (8.1 ha). Neighborhood park in central Mequon along the Milwaukee River. Contains bridge, canoe launch, playground, walking trail, and baseball diamond.
- Rotary Park: 75 acres (30 ha). Community park in northern Mequon. Contains basketball court, baseball diamonds, soccer fields, fishing ponds, and walking paths. Also contains Pukaite Woods which contains a handicapped accessible nature trail.
- Scout Park: 12 acres (4.9 ha). Nature preserve in eastern Mequon along the Milwaukee River. Contains a walking trail and river access.
- Settlers Park: 1.2 acres (0.49 ha). Historical park just south of Thiensville along the Milwaukee River. Contains the historic Isham Day House museum and a walking trail.
- Shoreland Nature Preserve: 19 acres (7.7 ha). Nature preserve in northeastern Mequon along the Milwaukee River. Contains walking trials.
- Swan Road Prairie: 20 acres (8.1 ha). Nature preserve in southwestern Mequon.
- Trinity Creek Wetland Habitat: 35 acres (14 ha). Wetland park in southern Mequon. Contains walking trails and educational facility.
- Villa Grove Park: 5 acres (2.0 ha). Community park east of Thiensville along Milwaukee River. Contains picnic tables and boat launch.
- Willow Bay Nature Preserve: 22 acres (8.9 ha). Nature preserve in northeastern Mequon along the Milwaukee River.

=== Ozaukee County parks ===
- Mee-Kwon Park: County park in northern Mequon. Contains public golf course, sledding hill and fishing pond.
- Virmond Park: 63 acres (25 ha). County park in eastern Mequon on Lake Michigan. Contains volleyball and tennis courts, baseball diamond, soccer field, picnic area.

=== Ozaukee Washington Land Trust ===
- Donges Bay Gorge: 23 acres (9.3 ha). Nature preserve on the shore of Lake Michigan with beach frontage and trails along a natural ravine.
- Fairy Chasm State Natural Area: 19 acres (7.7 ha). Nature preserve around an 80 to 100-foot deep chasm where Fish Creek flows into Lake Michigan. Relatively cooler temperatures create a microclimate which hosts plants not typical found in southern Wisconsin.
- Spirit Lake: 155 acres (63 ha). Nature preserve west of the Milwaukee River with trails and opportunities to observe sandhill cranes, turkeys, coyotes, deer, bald eagles, osprey and frogs.

== Recognition ==
In 2005, Money (magazine) ranked Mequon 19th among its 100 Best Small Cities in the United States, ranked jointly with Thiensville, a village surrounded by Mequon.

In 2017, Money (magazine) ranked Mequon as the 41st best place to live in the United States.

== Notable people ==
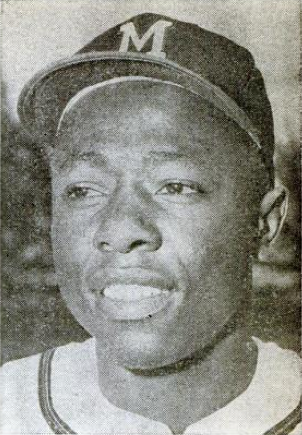
Hank Aaron (1934–2021) lived in Mequon while he played for the Milwaukee Braves.

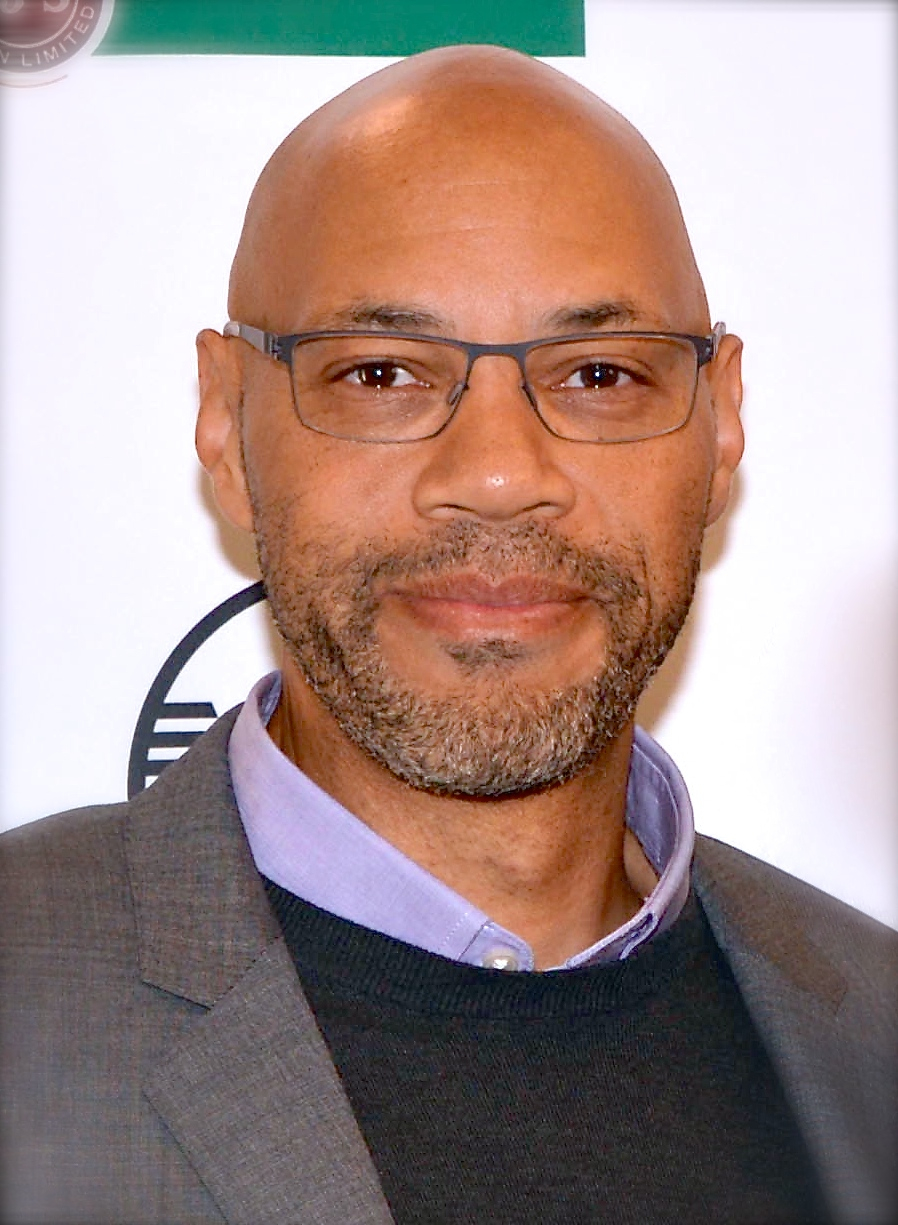
John Ridley (born 1965) grew up in Mequon and won an Academy Award for writing 12 Years a Slave.

- Hank Aaron, Major League Baseball player
- Ronald D. Asmus, U.S. diplomat
- Arthur J. Balzer, politician
- Anders Bjork, National Hockey League player
- H. H. Bonniwell, politician
- Fred J. Busse, politician
- Mike Dunleavy Jr., professional basketball player
- Bob Gannon, politician
- Ben Gardner, National Football League player
- Peter Goldberg, business executive
- Jack Harbaugh, professional football player and coach
- Shelby Harris, Nation Football League player
- Edward H. Janssen, politician
- Coby Karl, professional basketball player
- Louis G. Kieker, politician
- Carl Kiekhaefer, entrepreneur and NASCAR team owner
- Margaret S. Lewis, politician
- Steven D. Loucks, politician
- Balthasar H. Meyer, economist
- Owen Miller, Major League Baseball Player
- William F. Opitz, politician
- Willy Porter, musician
- John Ridley, screenwriter, director and actor
- Tom Segura, comedian
- Spencer Stastney, professional ice hockey player
- Thomas F. Timlin, politician
- William H. Timlin, jurist
- Caroline M. Clark Woodward (1840-1924), temperance activist
- Adolphus Zimmermann, politician
