= Fredonia (town), Wisconsin =

Town in Ozaukee County, Wisconsin

Town of Fredonia, Wisconsin
- Town
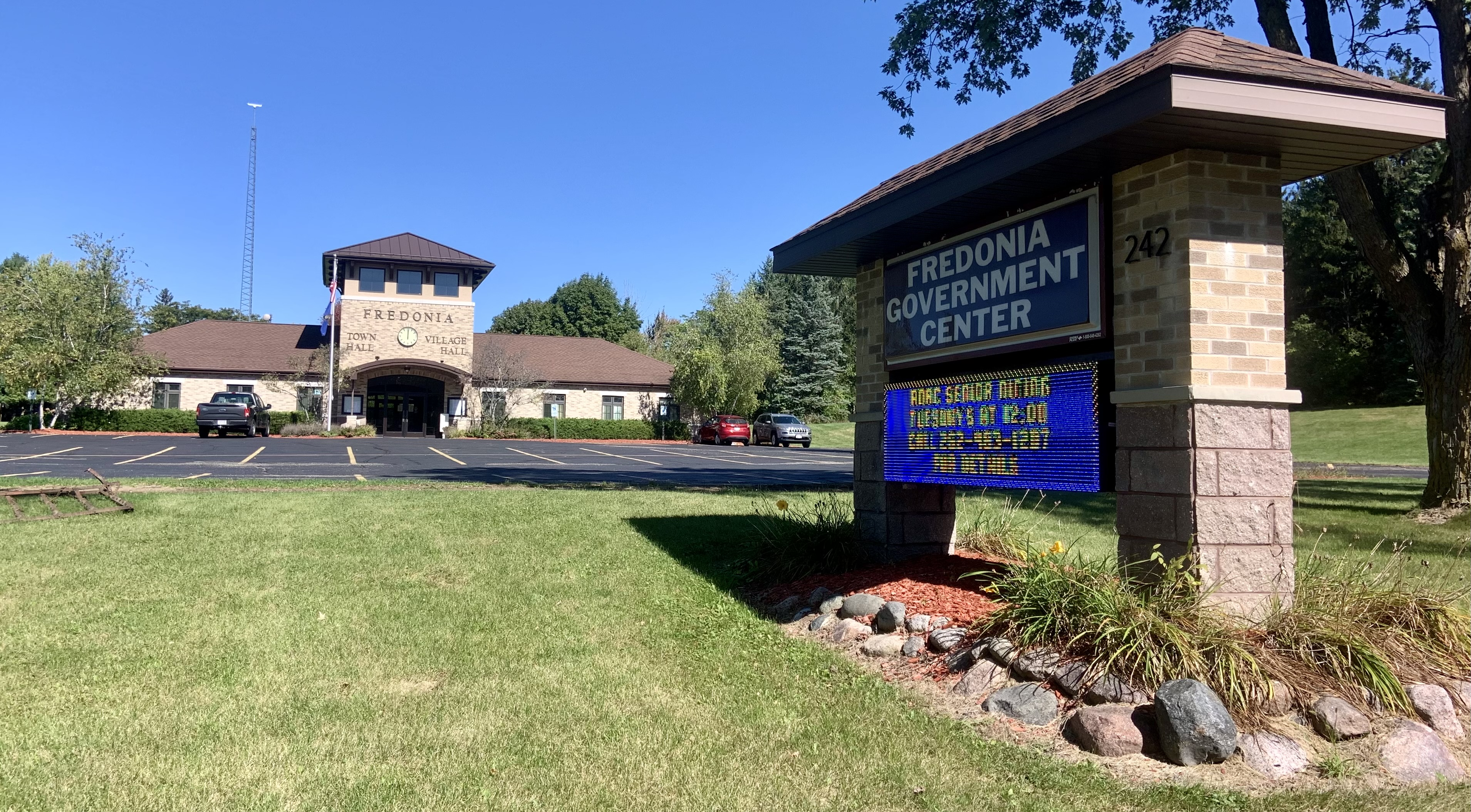
- Fredonia Town & Village Hall

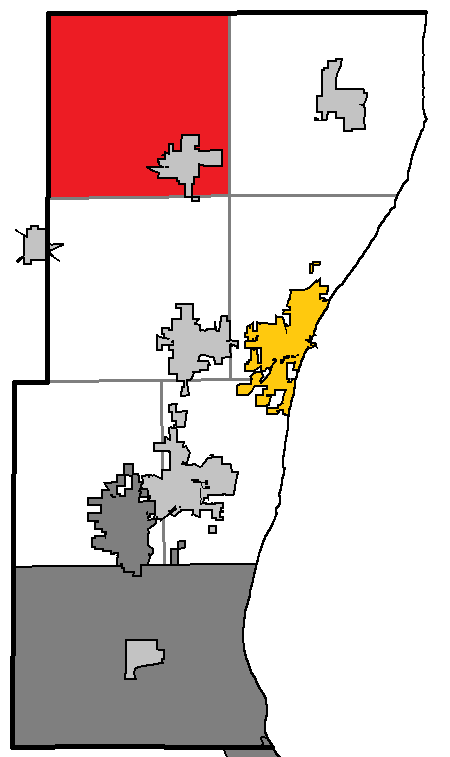
- Location of the Town of Fredonia, within Ozaukee County, Wisconsin.
- Coordinates: 43°30′02″N 87°58′58″W
- Country: United States
- State: Wisconsin
- County: Ozaukee
- Incorporated: 1847; 179 years ago

Government
  - Town Chairman: Lance Leider
  - Clerk: Christophe E. Jenkins
  - Treasurer: Jean Wills
  - Board of supervisors: Supervisors: Christopher Janik; John Depies; Mark Miller; Jim Stemper

Area
  - Total: 34.9 sq mi (90.5 km^{2})
  - Land: 34.7 sq mi (89.8 km^{2})
  - Water: 0.31 sq mi (0.8 km^{2})
- Elevation: 899 ft (274 m)

Population (2020)
  - Total: 2,078
  - Density: 59.9/sq mi (23.1/km^{2})
- Time zone: UTC-6 (Central (CST))
  - Summer (DST): UTC-5 (CDT)
- Area code: 262
- Website: www.fredoniawi.gov/town-fredonia-wi

Fredonia is a town in Ozaukee County, Wisconsin, United States. The population was 2,078 at the 2020 census. The Village of Fredonia is surrounded by the town. The unincorporated communities of Little Kohler and Waubeka are also located in the town.

== History ==
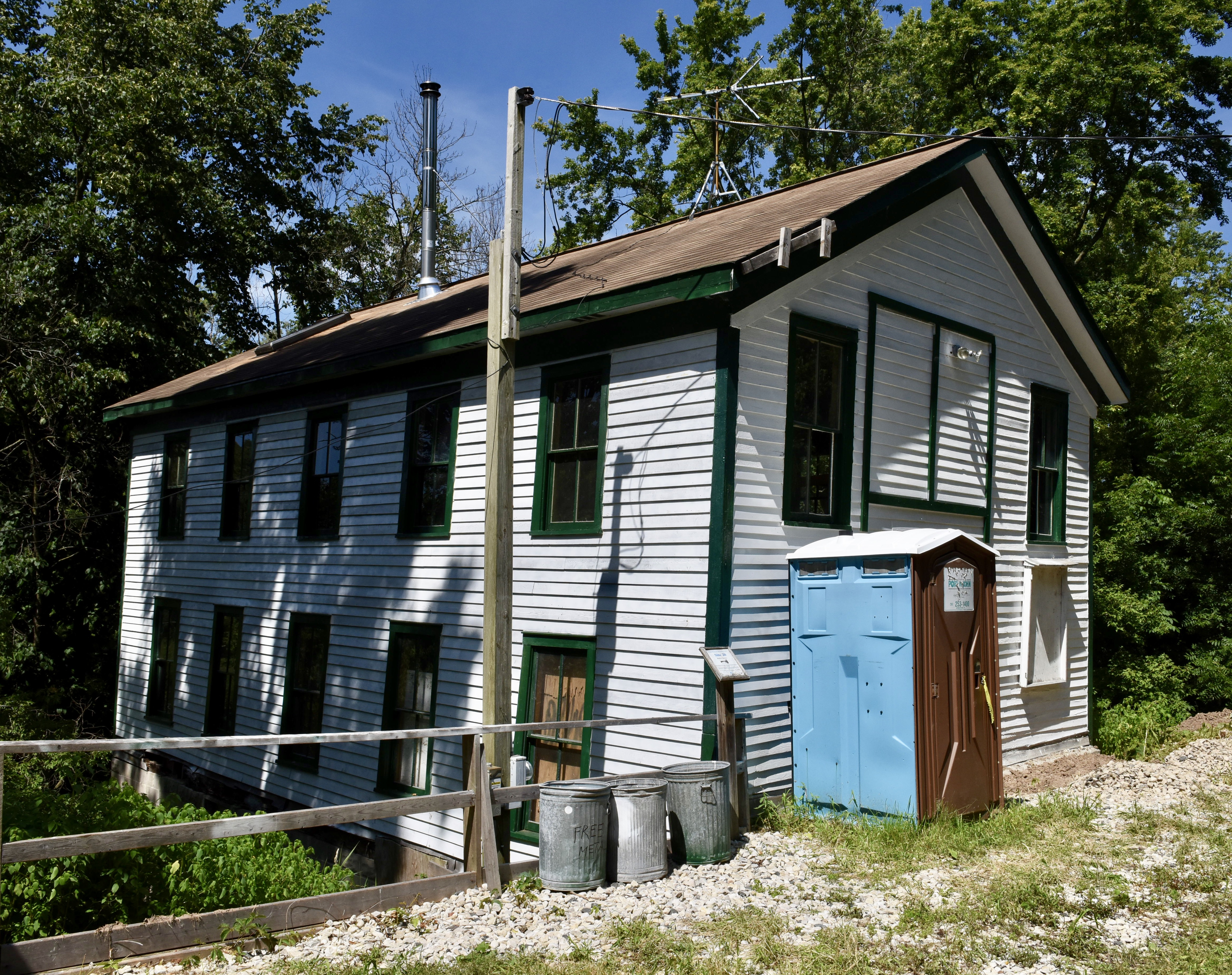
The Kendall Cabinet Shop in Waubeka was built in 1860 and was an early business in the community. The building is listed on the National Register of Historic Places.

The land that became the Fredonia was originally inhabited by Native Americans, including the Potawatomi tribe, who surrendered the land to the United States government in 1833 through the 1833 Treaty of Chicago. While many Native people moved west of the Mississippi River to Kansas, some chose to remain, and were referred to as "strolling Potawatomi" in contemporary documents because many of them were migrants who subsisted by squatting on their ancestral lands, which were now owned by white settlers. One such group was led by Chief Waubeka, who maintained a winter camp in the Ozaukee County community that bears his name as late as 1845. Eventually the Potawatomi who evaded forced removal gathered in northern Wisconsin, where they formed the Forest County Potawatomi Community.

Fredonia was part of the Town of Port Washington until 1847, when the Town of Fredonia was created and named after Fredonia, New York. A post office called Fredonia has been in operation since 1850.

Waubeka was the town's population center until the 1870s. In 1873, the Chicago, Milwaukee & St. Paul Railway construction Fredonia Station, which laid the foundation for the Village of Fredonia, which incorporated from some of the town's land in 1922.

Camp Fredonia, an Allied prisoner of war camp that held 330 German prisoners of war, was located in the unincorporated community of Little Kohler in the town. Forty-six U.S. combat veterans guarded the camp under the command of Captain Ray Thill, a native of Belgium, Wisconsin. The camp opened on June 15, 1945, and closed in January 1946. The headquarters was located in the Louis Glunz Hall on Fredonia-Kohler Road, while the prisoners slept in tents in a fenced enclosure. Most of the prisoners worked on local farms harvesting peas and sugar beets. Some were contracted to work at canneries in West Bend, Thiensville, Saukville and Belgium.

== Geography ==
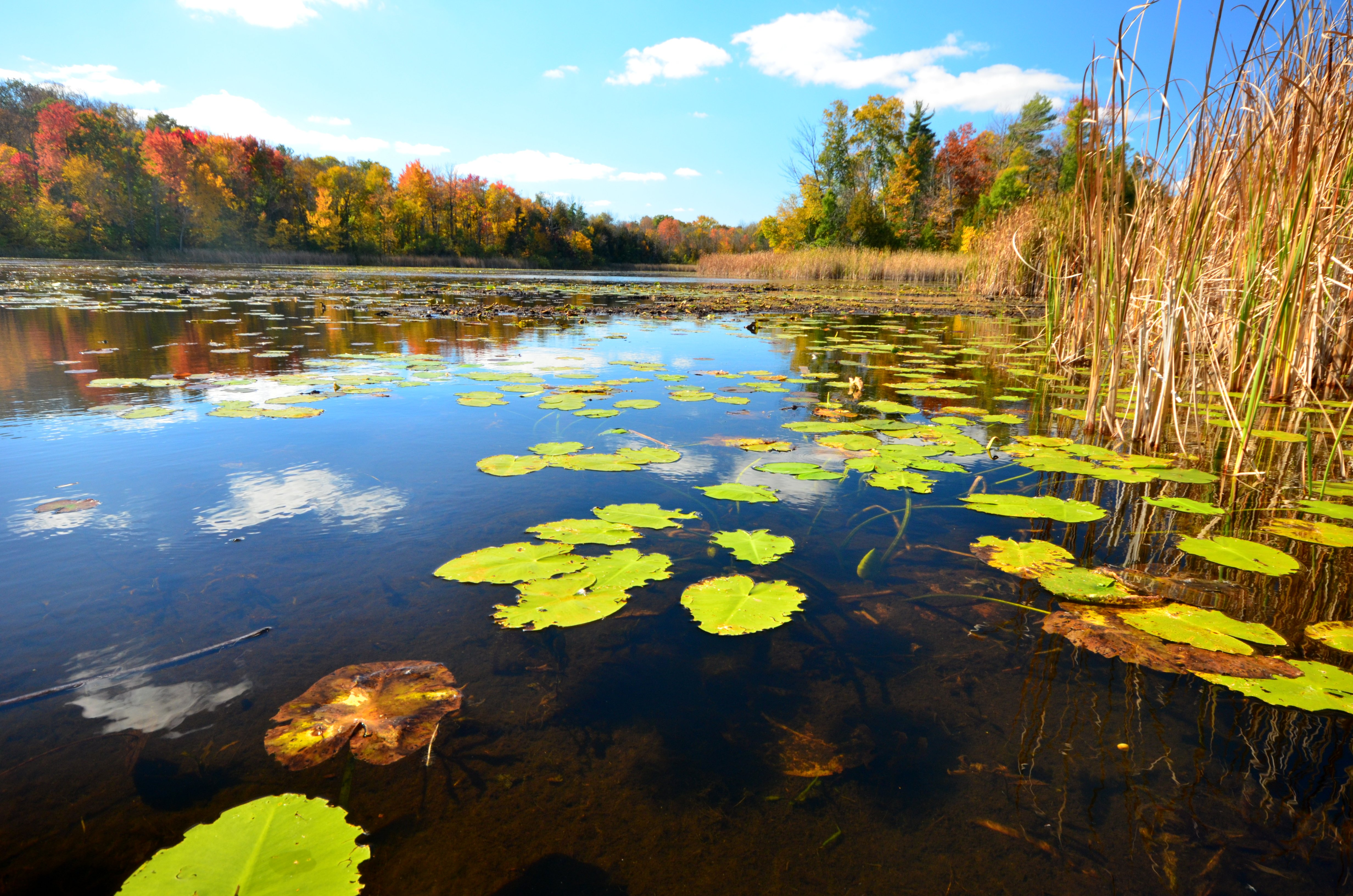
The 435-acre Huiras Lake Woods and Bog State Natural Area contains unspoiled bogs and conifer swamps common in northern Ozaukee County but rarely found in other parts of Southeastern Wisconsin.

According to the United States Census Bureau, the town has a total area of 35.0 square miles (90.5 km^{2}), of which 34.7 square miles (89.8 km^{2}) is land and 0.3 square miles (0.8 km^{2}) (0.86%) is water. The Village of Fredonia is located in what was formerly the southwestern quadrant of the Town of Fredonia. The town borders the Town of Sherman to the north, the Town of Belgium to the east, the Town of Saukville to the south, and the Town of Farmington to the west. The unincorporated communities of Little Kohler and Waubeka are in the western part of the town.

The town is located in the Southeastern Wisconsin glacial till plains that were created by the Wisconsin glaciation during the most recent ice age. The area has some subterranean Silurian limestone formations that are part of the Racine Dolomite that stretches through eastern Wisconsin and Illinois. The rocks are visible at several quarries along the Milwaukee River, including one site where the only known Silurian phyllocarid fossils in Wisconsin were discovered.

Before white settlers arrived in the area, much of the Fredonia area was an upland forest dominated by American beech and sugar maple trees. Much of the original forest was cleared to prepare the land for agriculture, although some of the town's nature preserves have characteristically pre-settlement forests. The area also has many bogs and swamps in the kettles left behind by the glaciers. The areas include the wetlands around Spring Lake and the bog in the Huiras Lake Woods and Bog State Natural Area. Fredonia's wetlands have extensive stands of white cedar and tamarack as well as shrub carrs and sedge meadows.

As land development continues to reduce wild areas, wildlife is forced into closer proximity with human communities like Fredonia. Large mammals, including white-tailed deer, coyotes, North American river otters and red foxes can be seen in the town. Many birds, including great blue herons and wild turkeys are found in the town, with the Huiras Lake Woods and Bog State Natural Area providing a habitat for many bird species.

The region struggles with many invasive species, including the emerald ash borer, common carp, reed canary grass, the common reed, purple loosestrife, garlic mustard, Eurasian buckthorns, and honeysuckles.

== Demographics ==
As of the census of 2000, there were 2,903 people, 727 households, and 585 families residing in the town. The population density was 83.8 people per square mile (32.3/km^{2}). There were 751 housing units at an average density of 21.7 per square mile (8.4/km^{2}). The racial makeup of the town was 97.14% White, 1.07% Black or African American, 0.28% Native American, 0.45% Asian, 0.62% from other races, and 0.45% from two or more races. 1.03% of the population were Hispanic or Latino of any race.

There were 727 households, out of which 36.3% had children under the age of 18 living with them, 73.9% were married couples living together, 4.5% had a female householder with no husband present, and 19.4% were non-families. 15.5% of all households were made up of individuals, and 5.6% had someone living alone who was 65 years of age or older. The average household size was 2.83 and the average family size was 3.18.

In the town, the population was spread out, with 18.6% under the age of 18, 32.6% from 18 to 24, 22.4% from 25 to 44, 20.1% from 45 to 64, and 6.3% who were 65 years of age or older. The median age was 24 years. For every 100 females, there were 94.3 males. For every 100 females age 18 and over, there were 90.5 males.

The median income for a household in the town was $55,388, and the median income for a family was $59,500. Males had a median income of $40,022 versus $23,333 for females. The per capita income for the town was $17,073. About 1.8% of families and 2.3% of the population were below the poverty line, including 2.5% of those under age 18 and 5.4% of those age 65 or over.

== Culture ==
=== Flag Day ===
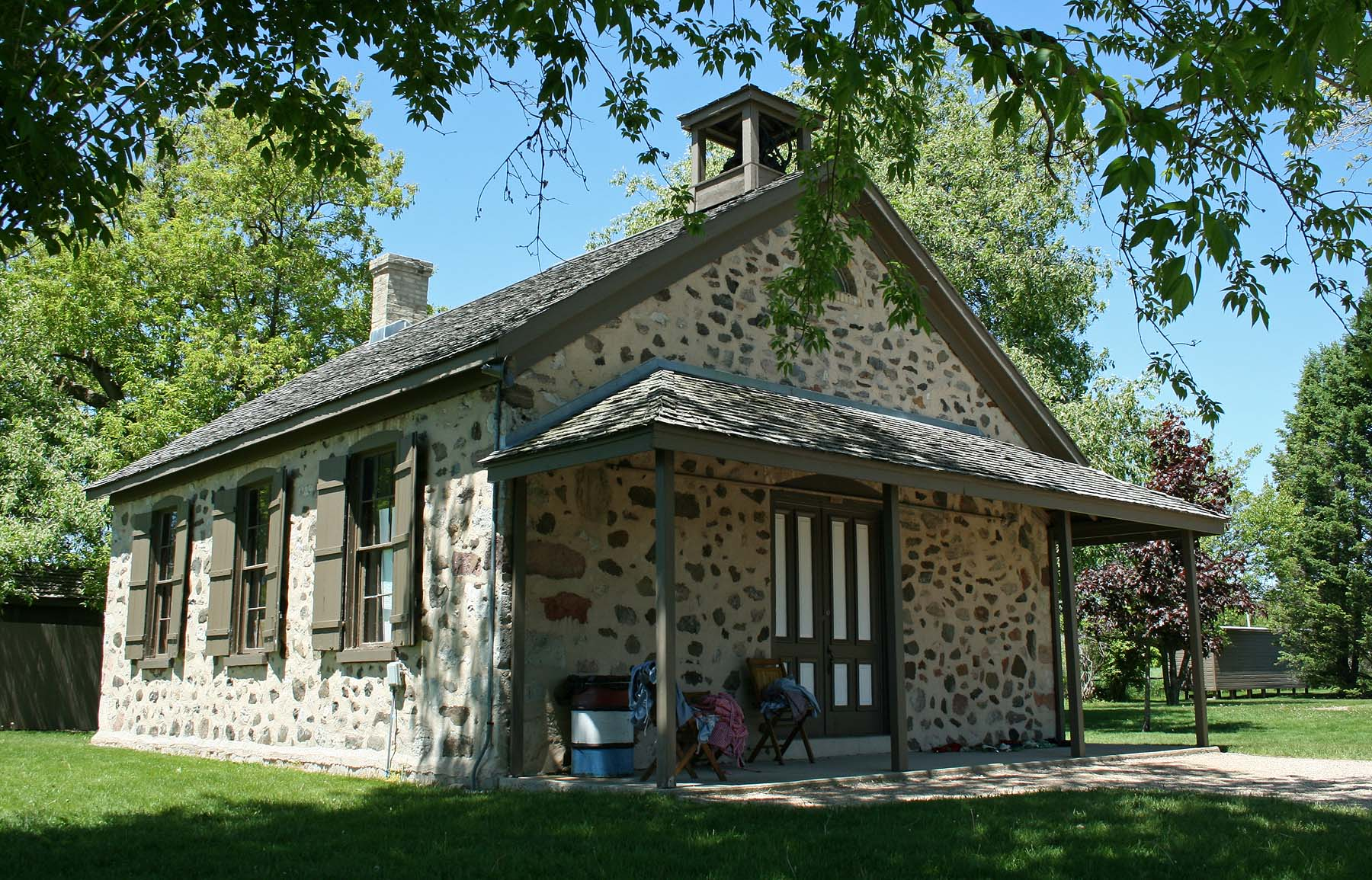
The Stony Hill School in Waubeka was the site of the first formal observance of United States Flag Day. The building is listed on the National Register of Historic Places and is a museum.

United States Flag Day was first observed in the Waubeka community in the town. On June 14, 1885, Stony Hill School teacher Bernard J. Cigrand instructed his students to write essays about what the flag of the United States meant to them to commemorate the Continental Congress's 1777 adoption of the flag as a national symbol. It was the first formal observance of Flag Day.

In 1995, the National Flag Day Foundation constructed the Americanism Center in Waubeka. A 13,000-square-foot facility on fifteen acres of land, the center serves as the foundation's headquarters and also houses a museum with an extensive collection of patriotic memorabilia, military uniforms, and artifacts from the life of Bernard J. Cigrand. The foundation organizes a parade in Waubeka each Flag Day.

=== Religion ===
The Village of Fredonia is home to the Divine Savior Catholic Congregation, which operates the St. Rose of Lima Chapel and a parochial school for kindergarten through sixth grades. The congregation also maintains the historic building and cemetery of St. Mary Mother of Sorrows Church in the hamlet of Little Kohler in the Town of Fredonia and offers services at Holy Cross Chapel in Holy Cross and Our Lady of the Lakes in Random Lake. St. John Lutheran Church, affiliated with the Missouri Synod, is also located in the Village of Fredonia.

== Law and government ==
Fredonia is organized as a town governed by an elected board, comprising a chairman and four supervisors. The current chairman is Lance Leider. The Town of Fredonia and the Village of Fredonia's government offices are located in a shared building.

As part of Wisconsin's 6th congressional district, Fredonia is represented by Glenn Grothman (R) in the United States House of Representatives, and by Ron Johnson (R) and Tammy Baldwin (D) in the United States Senate. Duey Stroebel (R) represents Fredonia in the Wisconsin State Senate, and Robert Brooks (R) represents Fredonia in the Wisconsin State Assembly.

== Education ==
The Town of Fredonia is served by two school districts. Students in the town's southern wards attends the Northern Ozaukee School District, which also covers the villages of Fredonia and Newburg, and parts of the towns of Belgium and Saukville. They attend Ozaukee Elementary School for kindergarten through fifth grade, Ozaukee Middle School for sixth through eighth grades, and Ozaukee High School for grades nine through twelve. Additionally, the Riveredge School is a tuition-free, public elementary charter school authorized by the district. Located at the Riveredge Nature Center in the northwestern Town of Saukville near the municipal boundary with the Village of Newburg, the school serves children from kindergarten through fifth grade.

Students in the town's northern wards attend the Random Lake School District. They attend Random Lake Elementary School for kindergarten through fourth grade, Random Lake Middle School for fifth through eighth grades, and Random Lake High School for ninth through twelfth grades.

Additionally, Divine Savior Congregation operates a Catholic parochial school in the Village of Fredonia offering kindergarten- through sixth-grade education.

== Transportation ==
Wisconsin Highway 57 passes through the town.

Ozaukee County Transit Services' Shared Ride Taxi provides a public transit option for Fredonia residents. The taxis operate seven days a week and make connections to Washington County Transit and Milwaukee County Routes 12, 49 and 42u. Riders must contact the service ahead of time to schedule their pick-up date and time. The taxi service plans their routes based on the number of riders, pick-up/drop-off time and destination then plans the routes accordingly.

The Wisconsin and Southern Railroad operates a freight line that passes through the town. Fredonia currently does not have a passenger train station.

== Nature preserves and recreation ==
The Ozaukee Washington Land Trust maintains three nature preserves in the Town of Fredonia:

- Hames Nature Preserve: A seven-acre lowland forest along the Milwaukee River, the Hames Nature Preserve contains hiking trails and opportunities for bird watching.
- Huiras Lake State Natural Area: Ozaukee Washington Land Trust maintains 113 acres of the 435 acres that make up the Huiras Lake State Natural Area. The preserve is a pristine forest and wetland containing bogs and conifer swamps typical of northern Ozaukee County.
- MacLaurin Woods: The five-acre preserve in western Fredonia has hiking trails and allows deer hunting in season.

Additionally, there are two private, religious camps in the town. Camp Awana is a 125-acre nondenominational evangelical Christian camp located on Lake Twelve in the town's northwestern quadrant. The Milwaukee Jewish Community Center owns 110 acres of the Huiras Lake State Natural Area, where it operates the JCC Rainbow Day Camp.

== Notable people ==
- Bernard J. Cigrand, founder of United States Flag Day, was born in Waubeka
