= Fredonia, Wisconsin =

Village in Ozaukee County, Wisconsin

- Village
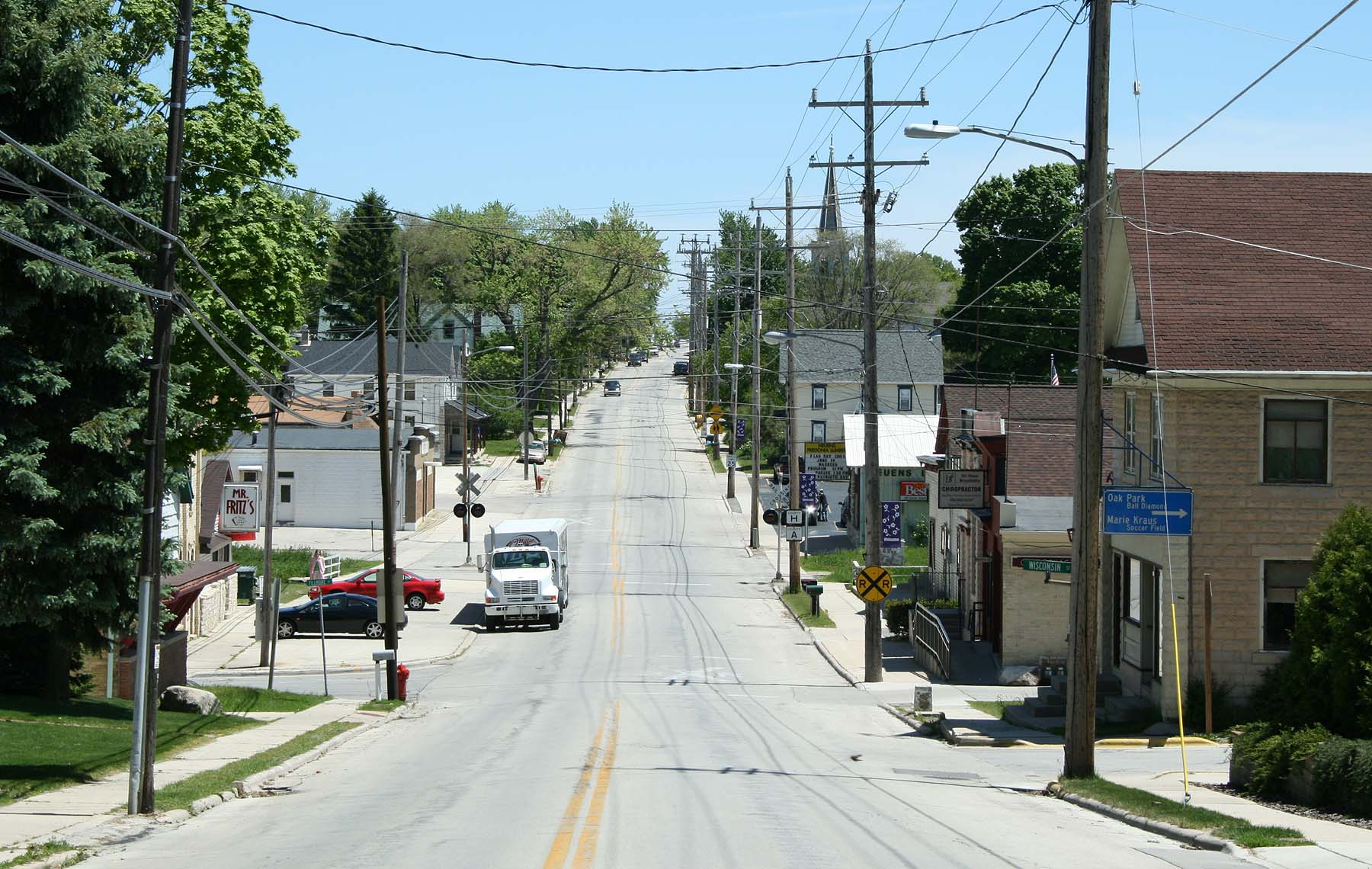
- Looking east in downtown Fredonia

- Location of Fredonia in Ozaukee County, Wisconsin.
- Coordinates: 43°28′6″N 87°57′6″W
- Country: United States
- State: Wisconsin
- County: Ozaukee
- Settled: 1840s
- Incorporated: 1922; 104 years ago

Government
  - Village President: Peter W. Lenz
  - Treasurer: Julie Upson
  - Village Board: Trustees: Richard Abegglen; Natalie Eippert; Jessica Franck; D.J. Syring; Shane Van Roo; VACANT
  - Village Administrator: Christophe E. Jenkins

Area
  - Total: 2.14 sq mi (5.55 km^{2})
  - Land: 2.14 sq mi (5.53 km^{2})
  - Water: 0.0077 sq mi (0.02 km^{2})
- Elevation: 896 ft (273 m)

Population (2020)
  - Total: 2,279
  - Density: 1,070/sq mi (412/km^{2})
- Time zone: UTC-6 (Central (CST))
  - Summer (DST): UTC-5 (CDT)
- Area code: 262
- FIPS code: 55-27575
- GNIS feature ID: 1565286
- Website: www.fredoniawi.gov

Fredonia is a village in Ozaukee County, Wisconsin, United States. Located on the Milwaukee River, the village is in the Milwaukee metropolitan area. The population was 2,279 at the 2020 census.

The community was the site of a Potawatomi village until at least the 1840s. The first white settlers in the area were Yankees, Germans and Luxembourgers who arrived in the 1840s, but the community was rural until the 1870s when the Chicago, Milwaukee & St. Paul Railway built a station in the area and businesses began to cluster it, laying the foundation for the village. Fredonia grew, incorporating in 1922.

The village is located east of the unincorporated census-designated place of Waubeka, the location of the National Register of Historic Places-listed Stony Hill School where the first United States Flag Day was observed in 1885. Today, Waubeka is home to the National Flag Day Foundation headquarters and its Americanism Center Museum, which has an extensive collection of patriotic memorabilia.

== History ==
The land that became the village of Fredonia was originally inhabited by Native Americans, including the Potawatomi tribe, who surrendered the land to the United States government in 1833 through the 1833 Treaty of Chicago. While many Native people moved west of the Mississippi River to Kansas, some chose to remain and were referred to as "strolling Potawatomi" in contemporary documents because many of them were migrants who subsisted by squatting on their ancestral lands, which were now owned by white settlers. One such group was led by Chief Waubeka, who maintained a winter camp in the Ozaukee County community that bears his name as late as 1845. Eventually the Potawatomi who evaded forced removal gathered in northern Wisconsin, where they formed the Forest County Potawatomi Community.

Fredonia was part of the Town of Port Washington until 1847, when the Town of Fredonia was created and named after Fredonia, New York. A post office called Fredonia has been in operation since 1850.

The Village of Fredonia had its origins in 1873 when the Chicago, Milwaukee & St. Paul Railway constructed Fredonia Station. At the time, the community of Waubeka was the center of the Town of Fredonia, but after the station was built businesses, granaries, and houses sprouted up around the station. The Village of Fredonia was incorporated in 1922 with a population of 272.

Camp Fredonia, an Allied prisoner of war camp that held 330 German prisoners of war, was located in nearby Little Kohler. In 1945, sixty of the prisoners were contracted to work at Fredonia Can Goods, Inc. in the village.

== Geography ==
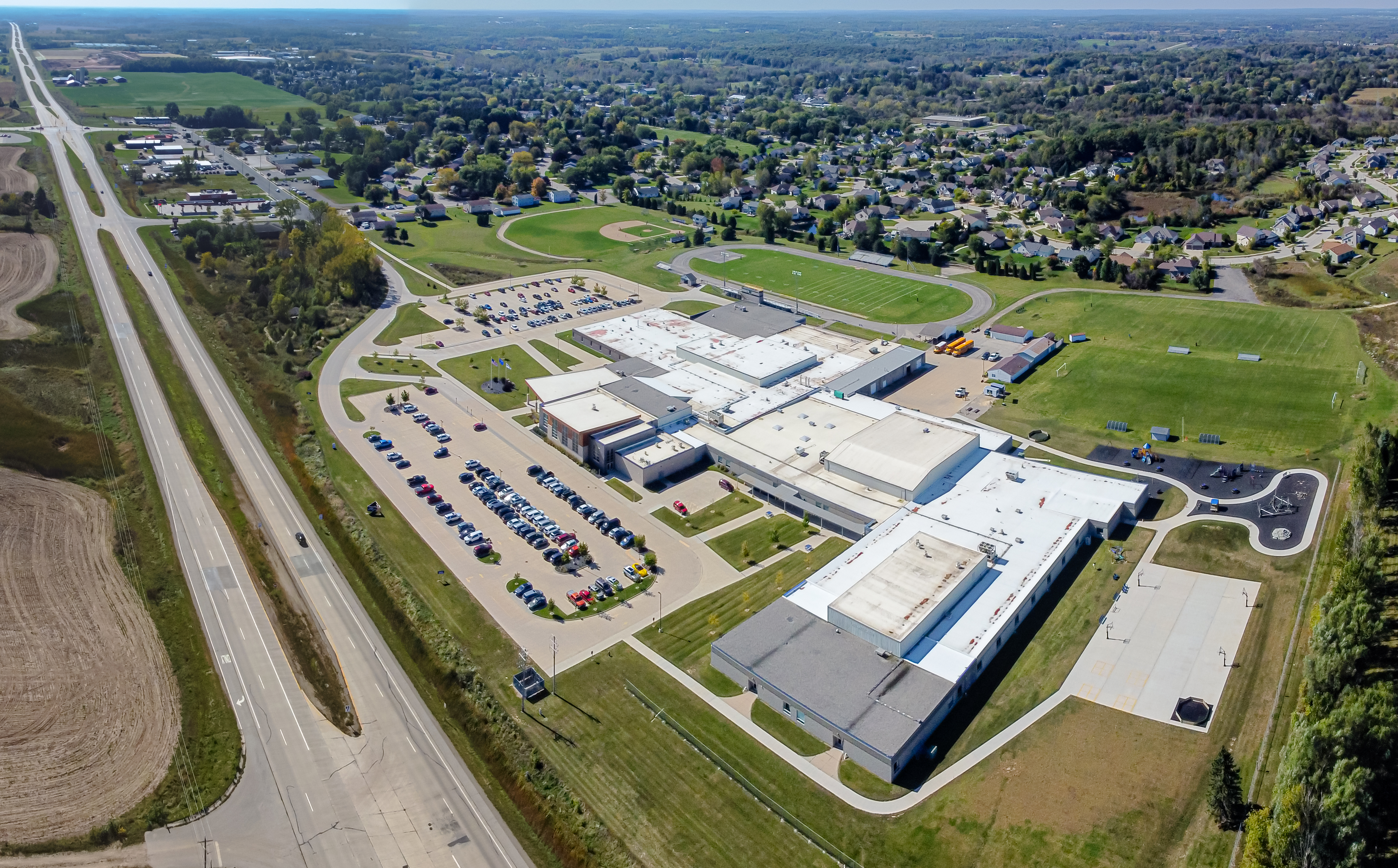

Fredonia is located at 43°28′6″N 87°57′6″W (43.468471, -87.95183). According to the United States Census Bureau, the village has a total area of 2.14 square miles (5.54 km^{2}), 2.13 square miles (5.52 km^{2}) of land and 0.01 square miles (0.03 km^{2}) of water. The Village of Fredonia is located in what was formerly the southwestern quadrant of the Town of Fredonia. The village's industrial park in the southern part of the village borders the Town of Saukville to the south. The unincorporated census-designated place of Waubeka is west of the village.

The village is located in the Southeastern Wisconsin glacial till plains that were created by the Wisconsin glaciation during the most recent ice age. The area has some subterranean Silurian limestone formations that are part of the Racine Dolomite that stretches through eastern Wisconsin and Illinois. The rocks are visible at two 19th-century quarries west of the village.

Before white settlers arrived in the area, the Village of Fredonia area was an upland forest dominated by American beech and sugar maple trees. There were also white cedars growing along the Milwaukee River, which flows along the village's western boundary. Much of the original forest was cleared to prepare the land for agriculture, but there's a two-mile stretch of forest along the river around Waubedonia Park.

As land development continues to reduce wild areas, wildlife is forced into closer proximity with human communities like Fredonia. Large mammals, including white-tailed deer, coyotes, North American river otters and red foxes can be seen in the village. Many birds, including great blue herons and wild turkeys are found in the village.

The region struggles with many invasive species, including the emerald ash borer, common carp, reed canary grass, the common reed, purple loosestrife, garlic mustard, Eurasian buckthorns, and honeysuckles.

== Demographics ==
Historical population
Census	Pop.	Note	%±
1930	312		—
1940	356		14.1%
1950	471		32.3%
1960	710		50.7%
1970	1,045		47.2%
1980	1,437		37.5%
1990	1,558		8.4%
2000	1,934		24.1%
2010	2,160		11.7%
2020	2,279		5.5%
U.S. Decennial Census

=== 2010 census ===
As of the census of 2010, there were 2,160 people, 827 households, and 614 families living in the village. The population density was 1,033.5 inhabitants per square mile (399.0/km^{2}). There were 873 housing units at an average density of 417.7 per square mile (161.3/km^{2}). The racial makeup of the village was 97.1% White, 1.0% African American, 0.1% Native American, 0.1% Asian, 0.6% from other races, and 0.9% from two or more races. Hispanic or Latino of any race were 1.8% of the population.

There were 827 households, of which 40.1% had children under the age of 18 living with them, 59.9% were married couples living together, 8.9% had a female householder with no husband present, 5.4% had a male householder with no wife present, and 25.8% were non-families. 20.2% of all households were made up of individuals, and 5.9% had someone living alone who was 65 years of age or older. The average household size was 2.60 and the average family size was 3.01.

The median age in the village was 35.7 years. 27% of residents were under the age of 18; 7% were between the ages of 18 and 24; 31.2% were from 25 to 44; 25.7% were from 45 to 64; and 9.2% were 65 years of age or older. The gender makeup of the village was 51.2% male and 48.8% female.

=== 2000 census ===
As of the census of 2000, there were 1,934 people, 701 households, and 536 families living in the village. The population density was 1,351.1 people per square mile (522.2/km^{2}). There were 734 housing units at an average density of 512.8 per square mile (198.2/km^{2}). The racial makeup of the village was 97.36% White, 0.52% African American, 0.52% Asian, 0.47% Native American, 0% Pacific Islander, 0.36% from other races, and 0.78% from two or more races. 1.40% of the population were Hispanic or Latino or Mexican or Spanish of any race.

There were 701 households, out of which 42.5% had children under the age of 18 living with them, 62.6% were living together, 9.3% had a female householder with no husband present, and 23.5% were non-families. 17.3% of all households were made up of individuals, and 5.1% had someone living alone who was 65 years of age or older. The average household size was 2.76 and the average family size was 3.17.

In the village, the population was spread out, with 29.6% under the age of 18, 8.4% from 18 to 24, 33.7% from 25 to 44, 20.7% from 45 to 64, and 7.5% who were 65 years of age or older. The median age was 33 years. For every 100 females, there were 97.5 males. For every 100 females age 18 and over, there were 97.0 males.

The median income for a household in the village was $53,173, and the median income for a family was $60,326. Males had a median income of $39,464 versus $26,292 for females. The per capita income for the village was $20,644. About 2.2% of families and 2.2% of the population were below the poverty line, including 2.5% of those under age 18 and none of those age 65 or over.

== Culture ==
Fredonia is home to the Divine Savior Catholic Congregation, which operates the St. Rose of Lima Chapel and a parochial school for kindergarten through eighth grade in the village. The congregation also offers services at Holy Cross Chapel in Holy Cross and Our Lady of the Lakes in Random Lake, and also maintains the historic building and cemetery of St. Mary Mother of Sorrows Church in the hamlet of Little Kohler. St. John Lutheran Church, affiliated with the Missouri Synod, is also located in the Village of Fredonia.

== Economy ==
Largest Employers in Fredonia, 2015
Rank	Employer	Industry	Employees
1	Guy & O'Neill Inc.	Wet wipe manufacturing	100-249
2	Northern Ozaukee School District	Primary and secondary education	100-249
3	Cedar Valley Cheese	Cheesemaking	50-99
4	Badger Paperboard	Paperboard milling	20-49
5	Comprehensive Contracted Services	Manufacturing	20-49
6	Industrial Graphics Corp.	Screen printing	20-49
7	McDonald's	Fast food restaurant	20-49
8	PHD Roof Doctors	Roofing contractor	20-49

== Law and government ==
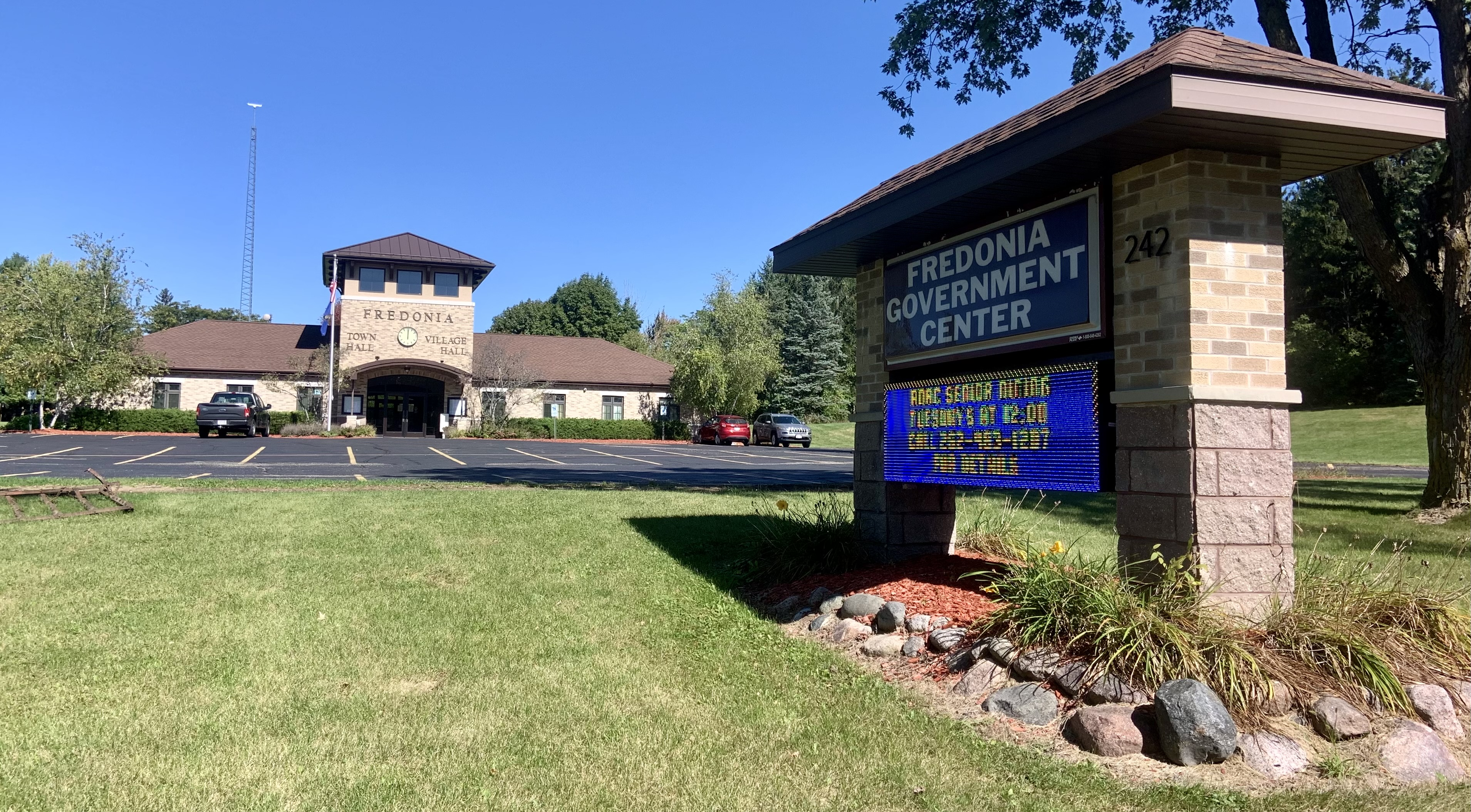
Fredonia Town & Village Hall

Fredonia is organized as a village governed by an elected village board, comprising a village president and six trustees. The current President is Peter W. Lenz. In 2022, the Village adopted a Village Administrator-form of government, hiring a full-time Administrator who works for the Board of Trustees and manages the day-to-day operations. The current Administrator is Christophe E. Jenkins - who was formerly the Mayor of the City of West Bend, WI.

As part of Wisconsin's 6th congressional district, Fredonia is represented by Glenn Grothman (R) in the United States House of Representatives, and by Ron Johnson (R) and Tammy Baldwin (D) in the United States Senate. Duey Stroebel (R) represents Fredonia in the Wisconsin State Senate, and Robert Brooks (R) represents Fredonia in the Wisconsin State Assembly.

The Fredonia Fire Department was formed in 1923, and has a staff of seventeen firefighters and eight EMTs. Brian Weyker serves as fire chief. The department is the first-responder for the Town of Fredonia and the Village of Fredonia, collaborating with the volunteer fire department in the neighboring unincorporated community of Waubeka. The department also provides ambulance service for the Village of Belgium.

Fredonia's law enforcement officer is the village marshal. Unlike a municipality with a police department, the village marshal does not provide 24-hour law enforcement, and when the marshal is off-duty, the village is served by the Ozaukee County Sheriff's Department. Eric Leet currently holds the office.

== Education ==
The Village of Fredonia is served by the Northern Ozaukee School District, which also covers Newburg, and parts of the towns of Belgium, Fredonia and Saukville. Students attend Ozaukee Elementary School for kindergarten through fifth grade, Ozaukee Middle School for sixth through eighth grades, and Ozaukee High School for grades nine through twelve. Additionally, the Riveredge School is a tuition-free, public elementary charter school authorized by the district. Located at the Riveredge Nature Center in the northwestern Town of Saukville near the municipal boundary with the Village of Newburg, the school serves children from kindergarten through fifth grade.

The district is governed by an eight-member elected school board, which meets on the third Monday of each month at 6:30 p.m. in the high school and middle school's shared library.

Divine Savior Congregation operates a Catholic parochial school in the village offering kindergarten- through eighth grade education.

== Transportation ==
Wisconsin Highway 57 passes through the village.

Ozaukee County Transit Services' Shared Ride Taxi provides a public transit option for Fredonia residents. The taxis operate seven days a week and make connections to Washington County Transit and Milwaukee County Routes 12, 49 and 42u. Unlike a typical taxi, however, the rider must contact the service ahead of time to schedule their pick-up date and time. The taxi service plans their routes based on the number of riders, pick-up/drop-off time and destination then plans the routes accordingly.

The Wisconsin and Southern Railroad operates a freight line that passes through the village. Fredonia currently does not have a passenger train station.

== Parks and recreation ==
The Village of Fredonia maintains seven public parks with amenities including playgrounds, baseball diamonds, soccer fields, picnic shelters, and ice-skating rink, and an eighteen-hole disc golf course. Additionally, Ozaukee County maintains Waubedonia County Park on the east bank of the Milwaukee River. The only county-maintained park to offer overnight campsites, Waubedonia also offers baseball diamonds, tennis courts, and boat launches.
