= List of ecoregions in Minnesota =

Minnesota ecoregions map prepared in 2007 by the United States Environmental Protection Agency

The list of ecoregions in Minnesota provides an overview to the ecoregions (see also, ecosystem) in the U.S. state of Minnesota, as defined separately by the Environmental Protection Agency/Commission for Environmental Cooperation, the Minnesota Department of Natural Resources, and the World Wildlife Fund.

== Environmental Protection Agency/Commission for Environmental Cooperation ==
Level I	Level III	Level IV
9 – Great Plains; 9.2 – Temperate Prairies	46 – Northern Glaciated Plains	46e – Tewaukon Big Stone Stagnation Moraine; 46k – Prairie Coteau; 46l – Prairie Coteau Escarpment 46m – Big Sioux Basin; 46o – Minnesota River Prairie
9 – Great Plains; 9.2 – Temperate Prairies	47 – Western Corn Belt Plains	47a – Loess Prairies; 47b – Des Moines Lobe; 47c – Eastern Iowa and Minnesota Drift Plains; 47g – Lower St Crois and Vermillion Valleys
9 – Great Plains; 9.2 – Temperate Prairies	48 – Lake Agassiz Plain	48a – Glacial Lake Agassiz Basin; 48b – Beach Ridges and Sand Deltas; 48d – Lake Agassiz Plains
5 – Northern Forests; 5.2 – Mixed Wood Shield	49 – Northern Minnesota Wetlands	49a – Peatlands; 49b – Forested Lake Plains
5 – Northern Forests; 5.2 – Mixed Wood Shield	50 – Northern Lakes and Forests	50a – Lake Superior Lacustrine Clay Plain; 50b – Minnesota/Wisconsin Upland Till Plain; 50m – Mesabi Range; 50n – Boundary Lakes and Hills; 50o – Glacial Lakes Upham and Aitken; 50p – Toimi Drumlins; 50q – Itasca and St Louis Moraines; 50r – Chippewa Plains; 50s – Nashwauk/Marcell Moraines and Uplands; 50t – North Shore Highlands Subsection
8 – Eastern Temperate Forest; 8.1 – Mixed Wood Plains	51 – North Central Hardwood Forests	51a – St. Croix Outwash Plain and Stagnation Plains; 51h – Anoka Sand Plain and Mississippi Valley; 51i – Big Woods; 51j – Alexandria Moraines and Detroit Lakes Outwash Plains; 51k – McGraw Till Plain and Drumlins; 51l – Wadena/Todd Drumlins and Osakis Till Plain
8 – Eastern Temperate Forest; 8.1 – Mixed Wood Plains	52 – Driftless Area	52b – Blufflands and Coulees; 52c – Rochester/Paleozoic Plateau Upland

== Minnesota Department of Natural Resources ==
The Minnesota Department of Natural Resources divides the state of Minnesota into regions based on the agency's Ecological Classification System (ECS), which follows the guidelines set forth by the National Hierarchical Framework of Ecological Units.

Provinces	Sections	Subsections
212 – Laurentian Mixed Forest Province	212J – Southern Superior Uplands	212Ja – Glacial Lake Superior Plain; 212Jd – St. Croix Moraine
212 – Laurentian Mixed Forest Province	212K – Western Superior Uplands	212Kb – Mille Lacs Uplands
212 – Laurentian Mixed Forest Province	212L – Northern Superior Uplands	212La – Border Lakes; 212Lb – North Shore Highlands; 212Lc – Nashwauk Uplands; 212Ld – Toimi Uplands; 212Le – Laurentian Uplands
212 – Laurentian Mixed Forest Province	212M – Northern Minnesota and Ontario Peatlands	212Ma – Littlefork-Vermillion Uplands; 212Mb – Agassiz Lowlands
212 – Laurentian Mixed Forest Province	212N – Northern Minnesota Drift and Lake Plains	212Na – Chippewa Plains; 212Nb – St. Louis Moraines; 212Nc – Pine Moraines and Outwash Plains; 212Nd – Tamarack Lowlands
222 – Eastern Broadleaf Forest Province	222L – Paleozoic Plateau	222Lc – The Blufflands; 222Lf – Rochester Plateau
222 – Eastern Broadleaf Forest Province	222M – Minnesota and Northeast Iowa Morainal	222Ma – Hardwood Hills; 222Mb – Big Woods; 222Mc – Anoka Sand Plain; 222Md – St. Paul-Baldwin Plains; 222Me – Oak Savanna
223 – Tallgrass Aspen Parkland Province	223N – Lake Agassiz, Aspen Parklands	223Na – Aspen Parklands
251 –Prairie Parkland Province	251A – Red River Valley	251Aa – Red River Prairie
251 –Prairie Parkland Province	251B – North Central Glaciated Plains	251Ba – Minnesota River Prairie; 251Bb – Coteau Moraines; 251Bc – Inner Coteau

== World Wildlife Fund ==
- Canadian aspen forests and parklands
- Central tall grasslands (consisting of parts of 251B (North Central Glaciated Plains) and 222M – Minnesota and Northeast Iowa Morainal) along with parts of 251C (Central Dissected Till plains) which are not in Minnesota.
- Northern tall grasslands
- Western Great Lakes forests
- Upper Midwest forest-savanna transition
