= Western Corn Belt Plains =

Level III ecoregion in seven U.S. states

Western Corn Belt Plains ecoregion
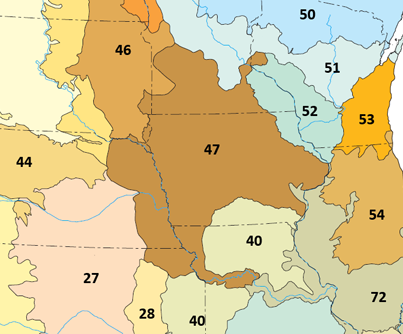
- Level III ecoregions in the region, with the Western Corn Belt Plains ecoregion marked as (47) (full map)

Ecology
- Borders: List: North Central Hardwood Forests (51); Driftless Area (52); Southern Coastal Plain (54); Interior River Valleys and Hills (72); Central Irregular Plains (40); Flint Hills (28); Central Great Plains (27); Nebraska Sand Hills (44); Northwestern Glaciated Plains (42); Northern Glaciated Plains (46)

Geography
- Country: United States
- States: Iowa; Kansas; Minnesota; Missouri; Nebraska; South Dakota; Wisconsin
- Climate type: Humid continental (Dfa)

The Western Corn Belt Plains is a Level III ecoregion designated by the Environmental Protection Agency (EPA) in seven U.S. states, though predominantly in Iowa.

It has been subdivided into fifteen Level IV ecoregions.

== Description ==
Once covered with tallgrass prairie, over 75 percent of the Western Corn Belt Plains is now used for cropland agriculture and much of the remainder is in forage for livestock. A combination of nearly level to gently rolling glaciated till plains and hilly loess plains, average annual precipitation of 26–37 inches, which occurs mainly in the growing season, and fertile, warm, moist soils make this one of the most productive areas of corn and soybeans in the world. Major environmental concerns in the region include surface and groundwater contamination from fertilizer and pesticide applications as well as impacts from concentrated livestock production.

== Level IV ecoregions ==
=== Northwest Iowa Loess Prairies (47a) ===
The Northwest Iowa Loess Prairies ecoregion is a gently undulating plain with a moderate to thick layer of loess. It is the highest and driest region of the Western Corn Belt Plains, as it rises to meet the Northern Glaciated Plains (46) of the Dakotas. Although loess covers almost all of the broad upland flats, ridges, and slopes, minor glacial till outcrops occur near the base of some of the side slopes. Silty clay loam soils have developed on the loess. The area is mostly treeless, except for the more moist areas along some stream corridors and on farmstead windbreaks. The dominant land use is cropland agriculture with some pasture and cattle feedlots.

=== Des Moines Lobe (47b) ===
One of the youngest and flattest regions in Iowa, the Des Moines Lobe ecoregion is a distinctive area of Wisconsinan glacial stage landforms currently under extensive agriculture. In general, the land is level to gently rolling with some areas of the moraines having the most relief. The morainal ridges and hummocky knob and kettle topography contrast with the flat plains of ground moraines, former glacial lakes, and outwash deposits. A distinguishing characteristic from other parts of Ecoregion 47 is the lack of loess over the glacial drift. The stream network is poorly developed and widely spaced. The major rivers have carved valleys that are relatively deep and steep-sided. Almost all of the natural lakes of Iowa are found in the northern part of this region. Most of the region has been converted from wet prairie to agricultural use with substantial surface water drainage. Only a small fraction of the wetlands remain, and many natural lakes have been drained as a result of agricultural drainage projects.

=== Iowan Surface (47c) ===
The Iowan Surface ecoregion is a geologically complex region located between the bedrock-dominated landforms of the Paleozic Plateau/Coulee Section (52b) and the relatively recent glacial drift landforms of the Des Moines Lobe (47b). The southern and southeastern border of this region is irregular and crossed by major northwest- to southeast-trending stream valleys. In the northern portion of the region, the glacial deposits are thin, and shallow limestone bedrock creates karst features such as sinkholes and sags. There are no natural lakes of glacial origin in this region, but overflow areas and backwater ponds occur on some of the larger river channels contributing to some diversity of aquatic habitat and a large number of fish species.

=== Missouri Alluvial Plain (47d) ===
The Missouri Alluvial Plain is part of the large, wide, flat alluvial plain found in five neighboring states. Surrounded by bluffs capped with deep loess, the historic island-studded meandering river channel has been stabilized and narrowed to manage discharge and to promote navigation and agriculture. The deep silty and clayey alluvial soils support extensive cropland agriculture. Most of the oak-hickory forest, floodplain forest, and tallgrass prairie has been removed due to conversion to cropland, although some wetlands are being restored.

=== Steeply Rolling Loess Prairies (47e) ===
Rolling hills with thick loess deposits and underlying glacial till distinguish the Steeply Rolling Loess Prairies ecoregion from the flat Missouri Alluvial Plain (47d) to the west. Land clearing has promoted vast sheet erosion and gullying and consequent re-deposition of loess in the valley bottoms. Potential natural vegetation is tallgrass prairie with woodland in narrow valleys and stream reaches. Most of the region is prime farmland and cropland is extensive.

=== Rolling Loess Prairies (47f) ===
Loess deposits on well drained plains and open low hills characterize the Rolling Loess Prairies ecoregion. Loess deposits tend to be thinner than those found in 47e to the west, generally less than 25 feet in depth except along the Missouri River where deposits are thicker. Potential natural vegetation is a mosaic of mostly tallgrass prairie and areas of oak-hickory forest. Although cropland agriculture is widespread, this region has more areas of woodland and pasture than neighboring 47e.

=== Lower St. Croix and Vermillion Valleys (Prairie Pothole Region) (47g) ===
Geography ranges from fairly flat floodplains and outwash plains in the uplands, to some ridges, ravines, and bluffs, especially near the rivers and streams that drain the area. The region has bedrock mostly of dolomite, covered by glacial till, loess deposits, and outwash. Natural vegetation consisted mostly of tallgrass prairie with occasional mixed hardwood forests, and some savanna in transitional areas between the two. Today, cropland agriculture is widespread, with some pasture and woodland remaining.

=== Nebraska/Kansas Loess Hills (47h) ===
The greater relief and deep loess hills of the Nebraska/Kansas Loess Hills are markedly different from the flat alluvial valley of neighboring 47d. Dissected hills with deep, silty, well drained soils supported a potential natural vegetation of tallgrass prairie with scattered oak-hickory forests along stream valleys. Cropland agriculture is now common and ample precipitation in the growing season supports dryland agriculture, with only a few areas requiring irrigation.

=== Loess and Glacial Drift Hills (47i) ===
Low, rolling loess-covered hills with areas of exposed glacial till are characteristic of the Loess and Glacial Drift Hills. Loess deposits are generally thinner than those in 47h, and historically there was less oak-hickory forest and more extensive tallgrass prairie than found in 47h. The flatter loess hills have a silty, clay loam soil that supports cropland, while rangeland is somewhat more extensive on the deep clay loams formed in glacial till soils.

=== Lower Platte Alluvial Plain (47j) ===
The Lower Platte Alluvial Plain is an extension of the broad Platte River Valley (27g) to the west; however, this region is within the Western Corn Belt Plains and contains a combination of vegetation, soils, and climate more similar to other areas in 47. Silty, loamy, and sandy soils are formed from alluvium, though not as sandy as the Platte River Valley (27g) to the west. Land use is mainly cropland with areas of irrigated agriculture. Tallgrass prairie, wet meadows, and scattered riparian forests are the potential natural vegetation of the area, with forests generally denser and older than in region 27g.

=== Northeastern Nebraska Loess Hills (47k) ===
The Northeastern Nebraska Loess Hills have an older, coarser loess mantle that is not as weathered as in ecoregions to the south. The climate is generally cooler with slightly less annual precipitation than in southern glaciated regions. Cropland agriculture, especially corn, is common, and there is more irrigated agriculture and pastureland, but fewer scattered woodlands than in neighboring Western Corn Belt Plains (47) regions.

=== Transitional Sandy Plain (47l) ===
As its name implies, the Transitional Sandy Plain ecoregion contains some of the characteristics of Sand Hills (44a) in the west and the glaciated regions to the east. This level to rolling plain has fine sandy loams to fine sands with soils coarser and sandier than other regions in 47. Potential natural vegetation is a combination of Sand Hills (44a) prairie, tallgrass prairie, and some wet meadows, and lacks the oak-hickory forest component found in more eastern regions.

=== Western Loess Hills (47m) ===
The Western Loess Hills ecoregion extends south from Iowa and covers only a small area in northwestern Missouri. The deep loess-dominated hills have greater relief and a higher drainage density than the Steeply Rolling Loess Prairies (47e) to the east. The more irregular topography and erosive, silty soils contribute to a mixed land use with less cropland and more pasture and woodland than neighboring regions. The flora of this region is mixed, with shortgrass and mixed-grass prairie and rare xeric species on south and west-facing slopes, and bur-oak woodland and tallgrass prairie on cooler, moister slopes.

== See also ==
- Ecoregions defined by the EPA and the Commission for Environmental Cooperation:
  - List of ecoregions in North America (CEC)
  - List of ecoregions in the United States (EPA)
  - List of ecoregions in Iowa
  - List of ecoregions in Kansas
  - List of ecoregions in Minnesota
  - List of ecoregions in Missouri
  - List of ecoregions in Nebraska
  - List of ecoregions in South Dakota
  - List of ecoregions in Wisconsin
- The conservation group World Wildlife Fund maintains an alternate classification system:
  - List of ecoregions (WWF)
  - List of ecoregions in the United States (WWF)
