= Kendall Cabinet Shop =

- U.S. National Register of Historic Places
- Location within Wisconsin
- Coordinates: 43.471737°N 87.991320°W
- Architect: John Kendall
- NRHP reference No.: 14000887
- Added to NRHP: November 29, 2016

The Kendall Cabinet Shop, which later became the Waubeka Pearl Button Factory, is a former factory on the Milwaukee River in the Waubeka community in the Town of Fredonia, Wisconsin. Built in 1863 by cabinetmaker John Kendall, the shop was one of the first industrial enterprises in Waubeka. Until the 1860s, the community's economy was largely agricultural and centered around the local gristmill, and the construction of manufacturing shops such as Kendall's marked a movement toward local industrialization. The community was home seven small manufacturing shops in the 1870s and 1880s, but the diversification of Waubeka's economy ultimately prove short-lived and lost momentum around the turn of the 20th century.

The shop shared a dam on the river with the shop the neighboring Schauble Flour Mill, and in 1892, the mill's owners purchased the shop and converted it to produce then-fashionable pearl buttons from the shells of freshwater mussels found in the rivers of the upper Midwest. At its height, the Waubeka Pearl Button Factory employed twenty workers, making it the community's largest business. However, the company closed sometime around 1908.

The dam was purposefully breached in 2001 and fully removed in 2003, although the mill race remains, and the structure was listed on the National Register of Historic Places on November 29, 2016.

== See also ==
- National Register of Historic Places listings in Ozaukee County, Wisconsin
