= Northern Minnesota Wetlands (ecoregion) =

EPA ecoregion in the United States

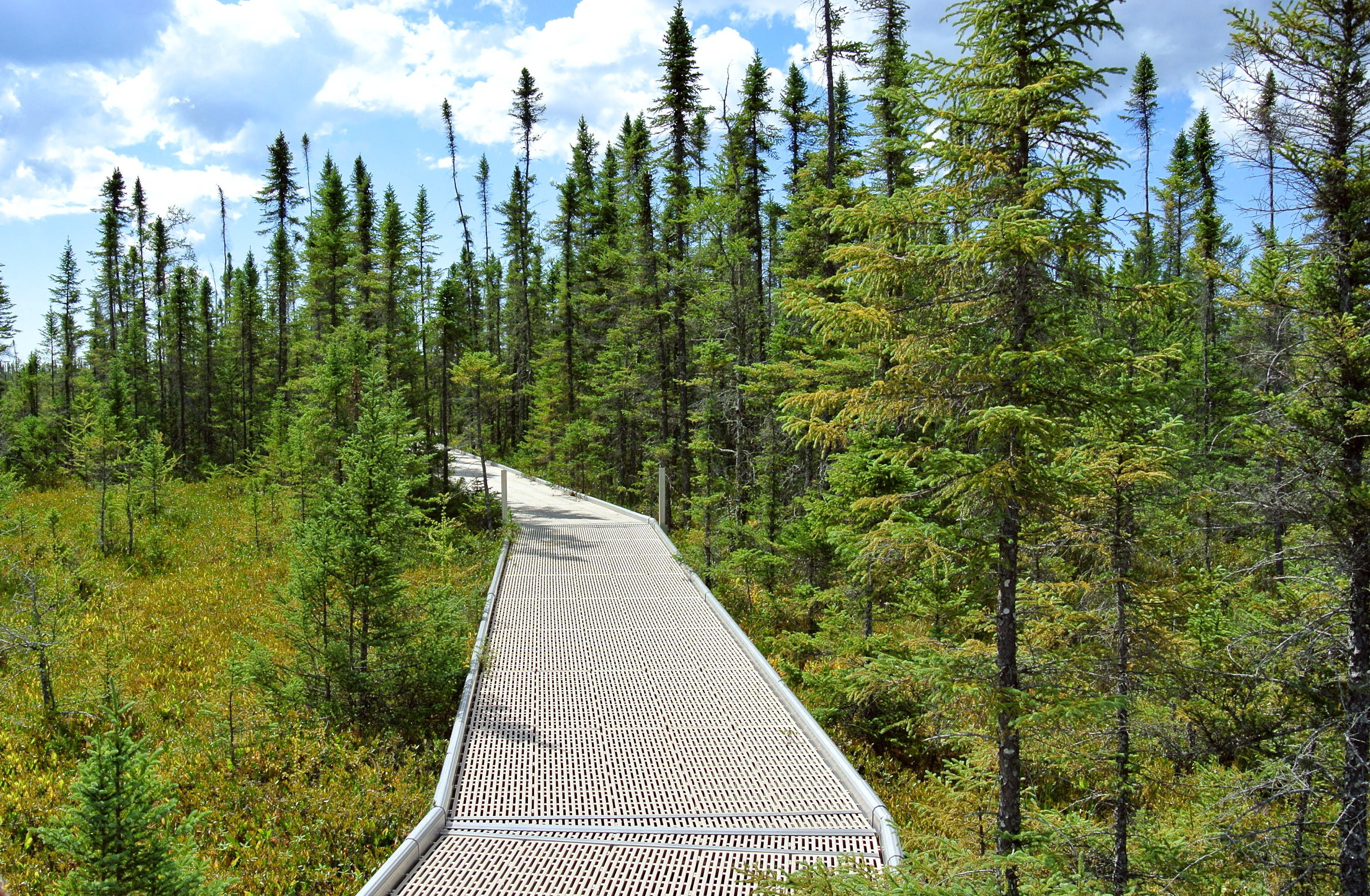
- Big Bog State Recreation Area, Minnesota

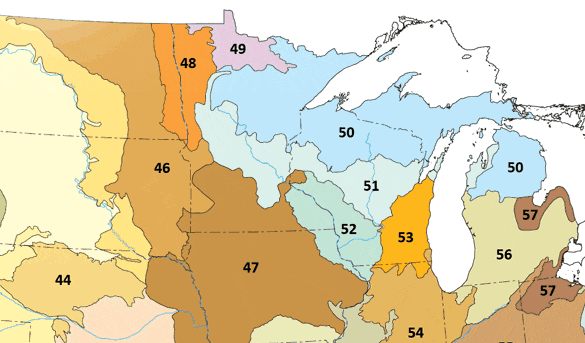
- Map of ecoregions of the Upper Midwest, with Northern Minnesota Wetlands shown as number 49

Ecology
- Realm: Nearctic
- Biome: Temperate broadleaf and mixed forests
- Borders: Northern Lakes and Forests; Lake Agassiz Plain

Geography
- Countries: United States
- State: Minnesota
- Climate type: Humid continental (Dfb)

The Northern Minnesota Wetlands ecoregion is a Level III ecoregion designated by the United States Environmental Protection Agency (EPA) in northern Minnesota in the United States. Designated as ecoregion number 49, the ecoregion is sparsely populated and generally features conifer bog, mixed forest, and boreal forest vegetation. Much of the Northern Minnesota Wetlands is covered by standing water although some low-gradient streams and rivers occur in the eastern part; lakes in the region tend to have lower phosphorus and algae concentrations than some other parts of the state due to an abundance of forests and less agriculture.

== Level IV ecoregions ==
Following is a list of smaller Level IV ecoregions within the Northern Minnesota Wetlands ecoregion, as defined by the EPA.

Number	Ecoregion name	Description
49a	Peatlands	One of the largest areas of contiguous wetland in the contiguous United States, common features of this region include bogs and fens, and the cold climate and wet soils limit agriculture. Almost a fifth of the area is part of the Red Lake Indian Reservation, which is held by the Red Lake Band of Ojibwe as the only closed reservation in Minnesota - meaning that all land is held in common by the tribe instead of being allotted into private property.
49b	Forested Lake Plains	This region contains mostly wetland and forest, with more forest in the northeastern part and interspersed through the southern part of the region. The topography is generally flat.

== See also ==
- List of ecoregions in the United States (EPA)
- List of ecoregions in Minnesota
- Geography of Minnesota
- Climate of Minnesota
