= List of ecoregions in Wisconsin =

Wisconsin ecoregion map prepared by the U.S. Environmental Protection Agency

The list of ecoregions in Wisconsin are listings of terrestrial ecoregions (see also, ecosystem) in the United States' State of Wisconsin, as defined separately by the United States Environmental Protection Agency (USEPA), and the World Wildlife Fund.

== USEPA ==
The USEPA ecoregion classification system has four levels, but only Levels I, III, and IV are shown on this list. Level I divides North America into 15 broad ecoregions (or biomes). Wisconsin is within the Eastern Temperate Forest, and in the Great Plains, Level I regions. Level IV ecoregions (denoted by numbers and letters) are a further subdivision of Level III ecoregions (denoted by numbers alone).

=== Great Plains ===
- 47 Western Corn Belt Plains
  - 47g - Prairie Pothole Region

=== Eastern Temperate Forest ===
- 50 Northern Lakes and Forests
  - 50a - Lake Superior Clay Plain
  - 50b - Minnesota/Wisconsin Upland Till Plain
  - 50c - St. Croix Pine Barrens
  - 50d - Ontonagon Lobe Moraines and Gogebic Iron Range
  - 50e - Chequamegon Moraine and Outwash Plain
  - 50f - Blue Hills
  - 50g - Chippewa Lobe Rocky Ground Moraines
  - 50h - Perkinstown End Moraine
  - 50i - Northern Highlands Lakes Country
  - 50j - Brule and Paint River Drumlins
  - 50k - Wisconsin/Michigan Pine and Oak Barrens
  - 50l - Menominee Ground Moraine
- 51 North Central Hardwood Forests
  - 51a - St. Croix Stagnation Moraines
  - 51b - Central Wisconsin Undulating Till Plain
  - 51c - Glacial Lake Wisconsin Sand Plain
  - 51d - Central Sand Ridges
  - 51e - Upper Wolf River Stagnation Moraine
  - 51f - Green Bay Till and Lacustrine Plain
  - 51g - Door Peninsula
- 52 Driftless Area
  - 52a - Savanna Section
  - 52b - Coulee Section
- 53 Southeastern Wisconsin Till Plains
  - 53a - Rock River Drift Plain
  - 53b - Kettle Moraines
  - 53c - Southeastern Wisconsin Savannah and Till Plain
  - 53d - Lake Michigan Lacustrine Clay Plain
- 54 Central Corn Belt Plains
  - 54e - Chiwaukee Prairie Region

== World Wildlife Fund ==
Realm	Biome	Ecoregion	State Location
Nearctic	Temperate broadleaf and mixed forests	Upper Midwest forest-savanna transition	North, Central, and Southern Wisconsin
Nearctic	Temperate broadleaf and mixed forests	Western Great Lakes forests	Far North Wisconsin
Nearctic	Temperate grasslands, savannas, and shrublands	Central forest-grasslands transition	Far Southeast Wisconsin
Nearctic	Temperate grasslands, savannas, and shrublands	Central tall grasslands	Far Southwest Wisconsin

== See also ==
- Geography of Wisconsin
- Climate of Wisconsin
- List of ecoregions in the United States (EPA)
- List of ecoregions in the United States (WWF)
