= Elizabeth Duane Gillespie Junior High School =

- U.S. National Register of Historic Places
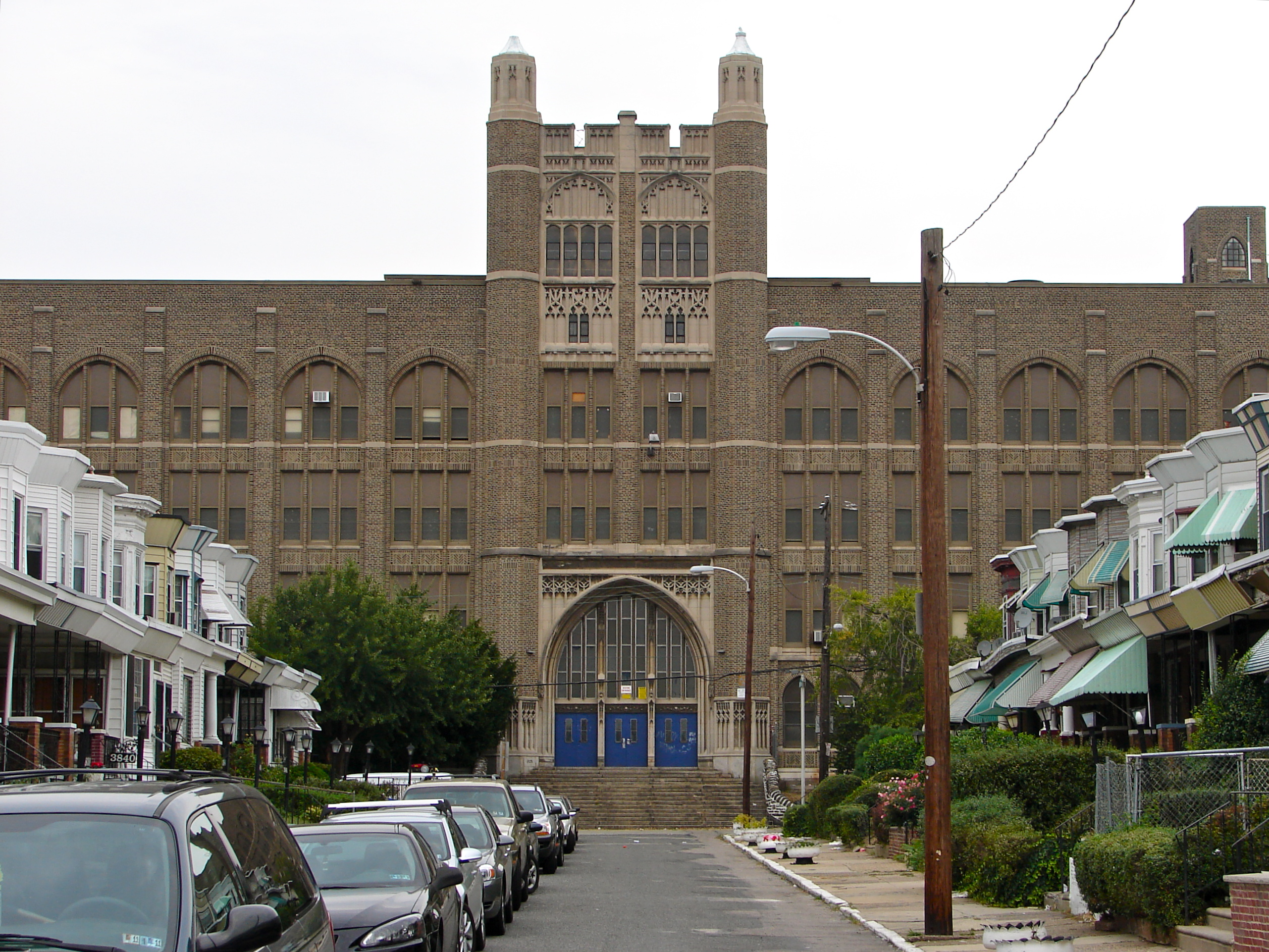
- Elizabeth Duane Gillespie Junior High School, September 2010

- Location within Philadelphia Location within Pennsylvania Location within the United States
- Location: 3901–3961 N. 18th St., Philadelphia, Pennsylvania
- Coordinates: 40°00′48″N 75°09′22″W
- Area: 1.7 acres (0.69 ha)
- Built: 1925-1927
- Architect: Irwin T. Catharine
- Architectural style: Late Gothic Revival
- MPS: Philadelphia Public Schools TR
- NRHP reference No.: 88002275
- Added to NRHP: April 10, 1989

Elizabeth Duane Gillespie Junior High School is a historic junior high school building located in the Nicetown–Tioga neighborhood of Philadelphia, Pennsylvania. It was designed by Irwin T. Catharine and built in 1925–1927. It is a four-story, 17 bay, brick building on a raised basement in the Late Gothic Revival-style. It features projecting end pavilions, arched openings, and a large stone Gothic entryway. It was named for president of the Colonial Dames of Pennsylvania and Flag Day founder Elizabeth Duane Gillespie.

It was added to the National Register of Historic Places in 1989. The building is now vacant, although it is immediately south of the still-occupied Simon Gratz High School.
