= North Central Hardwood Forests =

Ecoregion in the United States

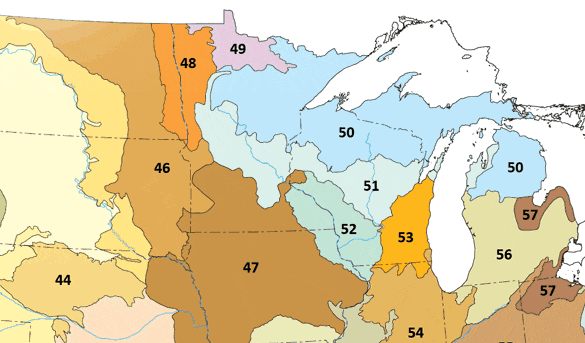
- Area 51 on map

Ecology
- Realm: Nearctic
- Biome: temperate broadleaf and mixed forests

Geography
- Country: United States
- State: Minnesota, Wisconsin, Michigan

The North Central Hardwood Forests are a temperate broadleaf and mixed forests ecoregion (no. 51 in the EPA Level III ecoregions of the United States) in central Minnesota, central Wisconsin, and northwestern Lower Michigan, embedded between (clockwise) the Western Corn Belt Plains in the south, the Northern Glaciated Plains, the Red River Valley, the Northern Minnesota Wetlands, and the Northern Lakes and Forests (ecoregion 50, approx. identical with WWF's Western Great Lakes forests). It forms the northern part of the upper Midwest forest-savanna transition, which also includes regions 52 (Driftless Area) and 53 (Southeastern Wisconsin Till Plains).

== See also ==
- Big Woods
- Upper Wolf River Stagnation Moraine
- Green Bay Till and Lacustrine Plain
- Door Peninsula
- Hardwood
- Wisconsin Department of Natural Resources
- Minnesota Department of Natural Resources
- Natural history of Minnesota
