= Little Kohler, Wisconsin =

Unincorporated community in Ozaukee County, Wisconsin

- Unincorporated community
- Location within Wisconsin Location within the United States
- Coordinates: 43°29′47″N 88°01′24″W
- Country: United States
- State: Wisconsin
- County: Ozaukee
- Elevation: 866 ft (264 m)
- Time zone: UTC-6 (Central (CST))
  - Summer (DST): UTC-5 (CDT)
- Postal code: 53021
- Area code: 262
- GNIS feature ID: 1567600

Little Kohler, or Kohler, is an unincorporated community located in the Town of Fredonia in Ozaukee County, Wisconsin, United States.

== Transportation ==
Little Kohler is located at the intersection of County Highway H (Kohler Drive, Fredonia-Kohler Road), Belgium-Kohler Road, and County Highway E. County H had been designated as Wisconsin Highway 84 before the highway was decommissioned.

== History ==
Martin and Theresa Koller and their children settled in the area in the 1840s, having emigrated from Bavaria. The community was originally named Koller, after them. In 1912, the Kohler Company created a planned community in an area of Sheboygan County formerly known as River Side. They named the village Kohler after the family company. At some point, the community of Koller began to be called Kohler as well. Residents of the Kohler in Ozaukee County then began referring to their community as "Little Kohler" to differentiate the two.

Little Kohler is the location of the former Camp Fredonia, an Allied prisoner of war camp that held 330 German prisoners of war guarded by 46 U.S. combat veterans under the command of Captain Ray Thill, a native of Belgium, Wisconsin. The camp opened on June 15, 1945, and closed in January 1946. The headquarters was located in the Louis Glunz Hall on Fredonia-Kohler Road, while the prisoners slept in tents in a fenced enclosure. Most of the prisoners worked on local farms harvesting peas and sugar beets. Some were contracted to work at canneries in West Bend, Thiensville, Saukville and Belgium.

== Attractions ==
The Pineview Wildlife Rehabilitation Center is located in Little Kohler. St. Mary Mother of Sorrows Catholic Church was built in Little Kohler in 1849. This parish merged with those in Fredonia and Holy Cross in 2001.
