= Waubeka, Wisconsin =

Unincorporated community in Ozaukee County, Wisconsin

- Census-designated place
- Location in Wisconsin
- Coordinates: 43°28′12″N 87°59′31″W
- Country: United States
- State: Wisconsin
- County: Ozaukee
- Settled: 1840s

Area
  - Total: 2.42 sq mi (6.26 km^{2})
  - Land: 2.34 sq mi (6.07 km^{2})
  - Water: 0.073 sq mi (0.19 km^{2})
- Elevation: 840 ft (256 m)

Population (2020)
  - Total: 640
  - Density: 270/sq mi (110/km^{2})
- Time zone: UTC-6 (Central (CST))
  - Summer (DST): UTC-5 (CDT)
- Area code: 262

Waubeka is an unincorporated census-designated place in the Town of Fredonia, Ozaukee County, Wisconsin, United States. Located on the Milwaukee River, the community is part of the Milwaukee metropolitan area. As of the 2020 census, its population was 640.

Inhabited by Native Americans into the mid-1800s, Waubeka was named for a Potawatomi chief who was friendly with the first white settlers who arrived in the area in the 1840s. Waubeka was the site of the first formal observance of Flag Day in 1885, and today the community is home to the National Flag Day Foundation's Americanism Center, which serves as the organization's headquarters and contains a museum.

== History ==
The land that became the Waubeka was originally inhabited by Native Americans, including the Potawatomi tribe, who surrendered the land to the United States government in the 1833 Treaty of Chicago. While many people moved west of the Mississippi River to Kansas, a few chose to remain, and were referred to as "strolling Potawatomi" in contemporary documents because many of them were migrants who subsisted by squatting on their former lands, now owned by White settlers. One such group was led by Chief Waubeka, who maintained a winter camp on the south bank of the Milwaukee River in present-day Waubeka as late as 1845. The chief's wigwam was located near the present site of the Gerald Joose house. In the Potawatomi language, "Waubeka" means "metal." Eventually the Potawatomi gathered in northern Wisconsin, where they formed the Forest County Potawatomi Community.

In the 1840s, Waubeka was the largest settlement in the Town of Fredonia. The first European civilization was from settlers who were English, Irish, Scottish, and Yankees from the East Coast. In 1848, a group of German immigrants arrived from Prussia and settled in the northern part of Waubeka. Luxemburger and Belgian newcomers settled in eastern Waubeka, and others from Bavaria and Saxony settled in the northwest.

== Geography ==
Waubeka is 840 feet (256 m) above sea level and is located at 43°28′30″N 87°59′25″W (43.4749994, -87.9903696). According to the United States Census Bureau, the community has a total area of 2.416 square miles (6.26 km^{2}): 2.343 square miles (6.07 km^{2}) land and 0.073 square miles (0.19 km^{2}) water. Waubeka is located in the Town of Fredonia, and borders to the Village of Fredonia to the east and the Town of Saukville to the south.

The community is located in the Southeastern Wisconsin glacial till plains that were created by the Wisconsin glaciation during the most recent ice age. The area has some subterranean Silurian limestone formations that are part of the Racine Dolomite that stretches through eastern Wisconsin and Illinois.

Before Europeans arrived in and civilized the area, the Waubeka area was an upland forest dominated by American beech and sugar maple trees. There were also white cedars growing along the Milwaukee River, which flows along the community and provided a power source for the community's early industries. Much of the original forest was cleared to prepare the land for agriculture.

Large mammals, including white-tailed deer, coyotes, North American river otters and red foxes can be seen in the village. Many birds, including great blue herons and wild turkeys are found in the community.

The region struggles with many invasive species, including the emerald ash borer, common carp, reed canary grass, the common reed, purple loosestrife, garlic mustard, Eurasian buckthorns, and honeysuckles.

== Flag Day ==
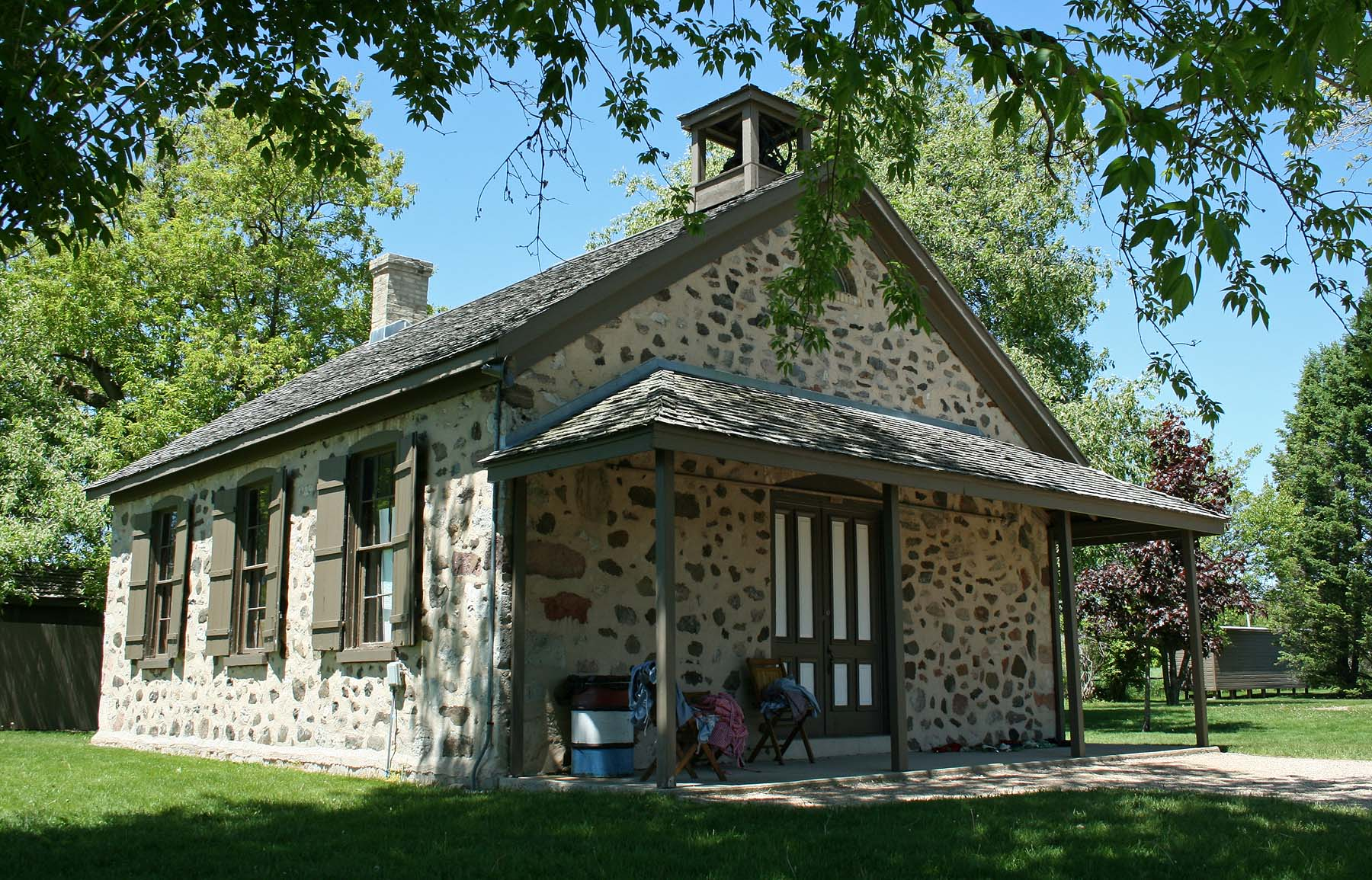
Stony Hill School

United States Flag Day was first formally observed in Waubeka. On June 14, 1885, Stony Hill School teacher and Waubeka-native Bernard J. Cigrand instructed his students to write essays about what the flag of the United States meant to them to commemorate the Continental Congress's 1777 adoption of the flag as a national symbol. It was the first formal observance of Flag Day.

In 1995, the National Flag Day Foundation constructed the Americanism Center in Waubeka. A 13,000-square-foot facility on fifteen acres of land, the center serves as the foundation's headquarters and also houses a museum with an extensive collection of patriotic memorabilia, military uniforms, and artifacts from the life of Bernard J. Cigrand. The foundation organizes a parade in Waubeka each Flag Day.

== Notable people ==
- Bernard J. Cigrand, founder of Flag Day in the United States, was born in Waubeka.
