= Bernard J. Cigrand =

American dentist

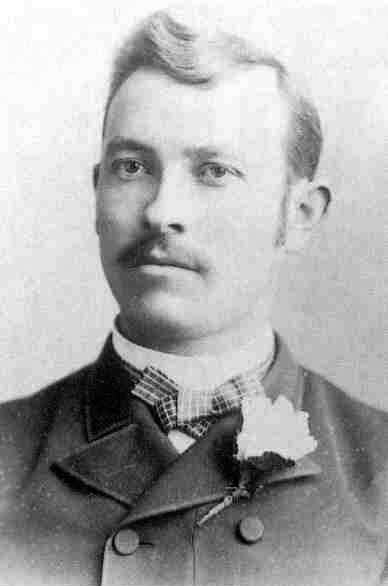
Bernard J. Cigrand

Bernard John Cigrand (October 1, 1866 – May 16, 1932), a dentist, has a strong claim to being considered the father of Flag Day in the United States.

Born in Waubeka, Wisconsin, to immigrants from Bourglinster, Luxembourg, Cigrand practiced dentistry in Chicago, Batavia, and Aurora, and was the third dean of Columbian Dental College, now the University of Illinois at Chicago College of Dentistry, serving in that post from 1903 to 1906.

Working as a grade school teacher in Waubeka, Wisconsin, in 1885, Cigrand held the first recognized formal observance of Flag Day at Stony Hill School in Waubeka. The school has been restored, and a bust of Cigrand also honors him at the National Flag Day Americanism Center in Waubeka.

Cigrand moved to Chicago to attend dental school and, in June 1886, first publicly proposed an annual observance of the birth of the United States flag in an article titled "The Fourteenth of June," published in the Chicago Argus newspaper. In June 1888, Cigrand advocated establishing the holiday in a speech before the "Sons of America," a Chicago group. The organization founded a magazine, American Standard, in order to promote reverence for American emblems. Cigrand was appointed editor-in-chief and wrote articles in the magazine as well as in other magazines and newspapers to promote the holiday.

On the third Saturday in June 1894, a public school children’s celebration of Flag Day took place in Chicago at Douglas, Garfield, Humboldt, Lincoln, and Washington Parks. More than 300,000 children participated, and the celebration was repeated the next year.

From the late 1880s on, Cigrand spoke around the country promoting patriotism, respect for the flag, and the need for the annual observance of a flag day on June 14, the day in 1777 that the Continental Congress adopted the Stars and Stripes. He became president of the American Flag Day Association and later of the National Flag Day Society, which allowed him to promote his cause with organizational backing. Cigrand once noted he had given 2,188 speeches on patriotism and the flag.

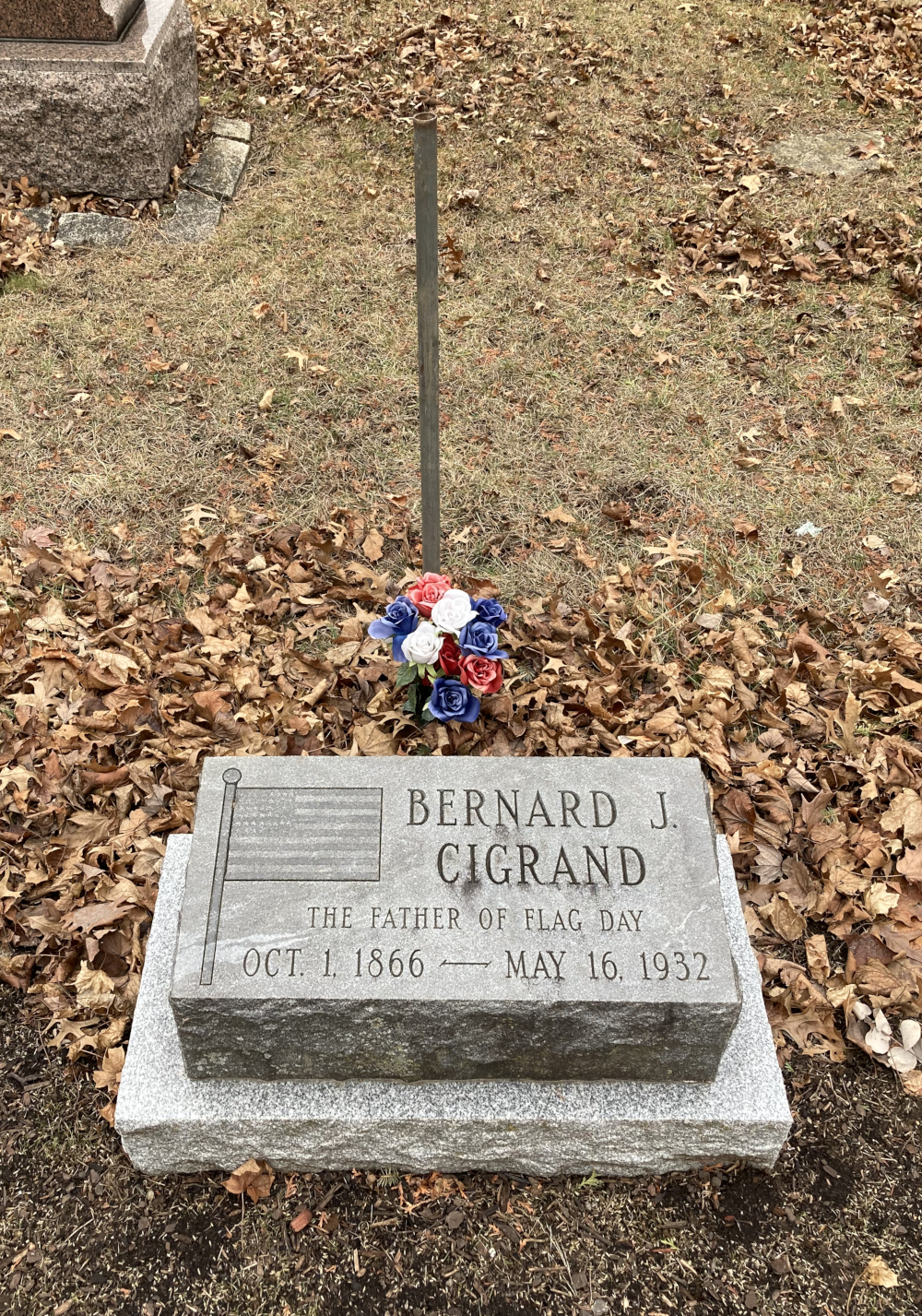
Cigrand's grave at Riverside Cemetery

After joining the UIC College of Dentistry's teaching staff in 1899, Cigrand was elected by faculty to the Paris International Congress of Educators in 1900. He also was elected secretary of the faculty before becoming dean. After his deanship, he remained on the faculty well into the 1920s and was a frequent contributor to five Chicago newspapers

Cigrand moved to Batavia, Illinois, in 1913 and built a house at 1184 South Batavia Avenue, which still stands. He practiced dentistry in the lower level of his home until 1920, when he moved his office to Aurora, Illinois. Cigrand continued to live in Batavia until 1932; he died shortly thereafter. He was buried at Riverside Cemetery in Montgomery, Illinois.

After 30 years of Cigrand's advocacy, President Woodrow Wilson proclaimed June 14 as Flag Day in 1916. (The United States Congress formally made the proclamation law in August 1949).

Cigrand generally is credited with being the "Father of Flag Day," with the Chicago Tribune noting that he "almost singlehandedly" established the holiday.

Preceded by Adelbert Henry Peck	Deans of the University of Illinois at Chicago College of Dentistry; 1903-1906	Succeeded by George Washington Cook
