= North Shore Highlands =

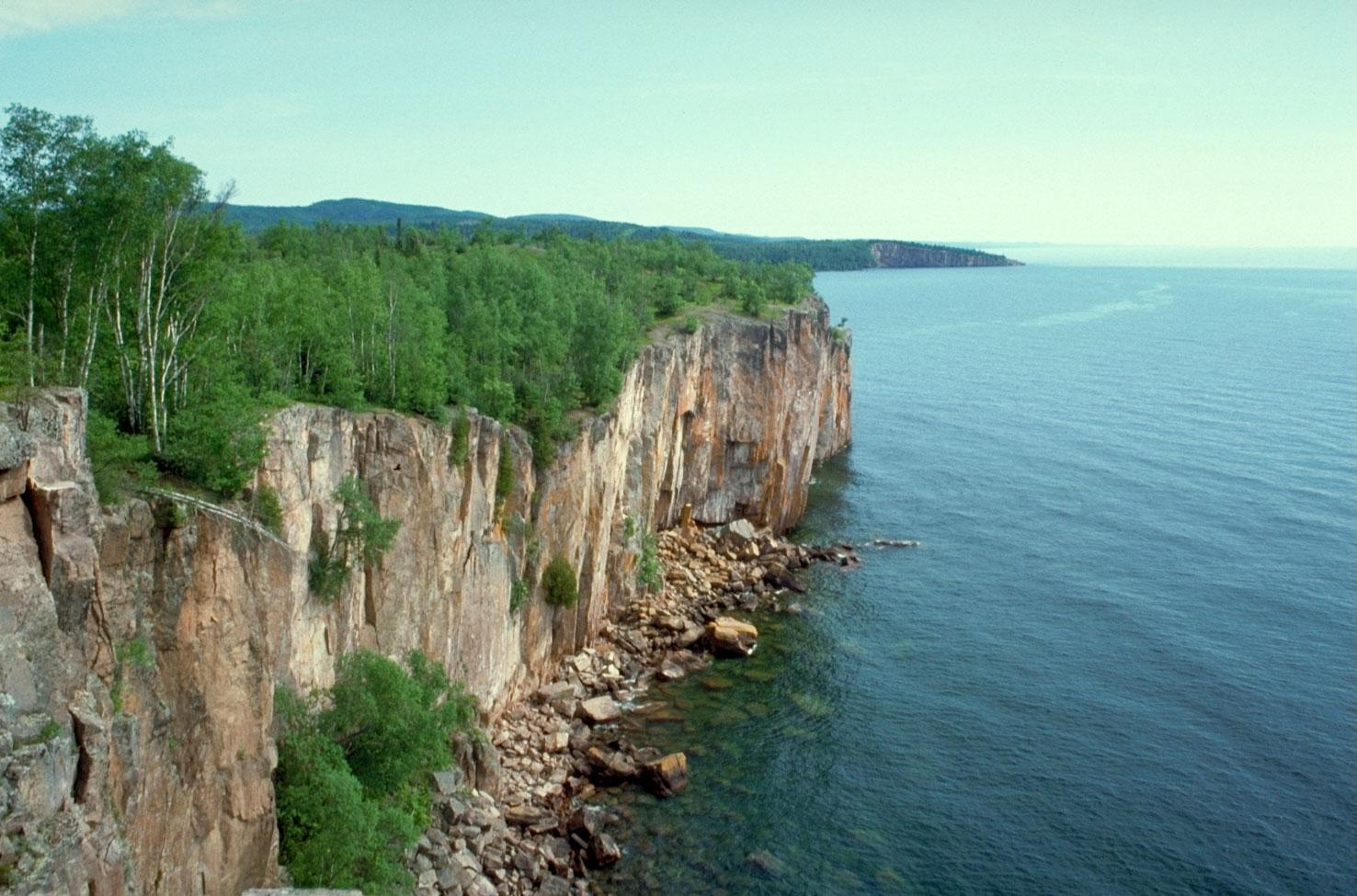
Cliffs of Palisade Head on Lake Superior

The North Shore Highlands are a physiographic and ecological region of the U.S. state of Minnesota in central North America. They were formed by a variety of geologic processes, but are principally composed of rock created by magma and lava from a rift about 1.1 billion years ago, which rock formations are interspersed with and overlain by glacial deposits. Their ecology derives from these origins, with thin, rocky soils supporting flora and fauna typical of their northern, inland location.

== Geography ==
The North Shore Highlands are part of what once was called the Cabotian Mountains, a name applied to the highlands north of Lake Superior. They are bounded on the south by the North Shore of Lake Superior, from which they rise in rock formations ranging from gentle slopes to sheer cliffs. They extend from the Dalles of the Saint Louis River in Jay Cooke State Park on the west near Thomson, Minnesota, to the Grand Portage Highlands in the Grand Portage Indian Reservation at the easternmost extremity of the state.

== Geology ==
Geologically, the region is part of the southern reaches of the rugged Canadian Shield, the core of the North American craton. The bedrock was created during the Midcontinent Rift, a failed rift which occurred some 1.1 billion years ago. As the continent sundered, magma and lava flowed upward, which cooled into the present-day rock of the Duluth Complex and North Shore Volcanic Group. Much of these rocks remain exposed, often in prominences which were more resistant to erosion. Mafic intrusions of gabbro of the Duluth Complex anchor both ends of the highlands, to the west of Duluth and above Grand Portage Bay to the east. Between them is an area of basaltic rocks of the North Shore Volcanics, interspersed with occasional mafic rocks. These basaltic layers, formed from lava emitted from rift fissures in the center of what is now Lake Superior, subsided in the middle (forming the present lake basin); the edges angle upward from the lake in a serrated series of ridges known as the Sawtooth Mountains along the lakeshore.

Both the mafic and volcanic rocks have been partially eroded, leaving the more resistant rock standing above the surrounded country. Much of that erosion took place in repeated glaciations. The most recent of these glaciations, the Wisconsin, included the Superior lobe, which passed over the area along the lake basin from the northeast to southwest. This left a terminal moraine where the glacier halted, and a ground moraine in other areas once covered by the continental glacier. The terminal moraine, known as the "Highlands Moraine", parallels the lakeshore, and forms the inland hills of the North Shore Highlands. The "Highland Flutes" lie between the moraine and the lake; the "Toimi Drumlin Field" is on the far side of the moraine, just west of the highlands.

== Ecology ==
Ecologically, the area is the North Shore Highlands Subsection of the Northern Superior Uplands Section of the Laurentian Mixed Forest Province of Minnesota. Soils are thin and rocky. The region remains heavily forested. Flora are those of the Temperate broadleaf and mixed forests Biome, containing both deciduous and coniferous trees.

== Human history ==
The rugged nature of the terrain limited exploration in pre-industrial times, except in two places where the highlands were pierced by rivers. The St. Louis River on the western edge gave fur traders and other explorers a route from the Saint Lawrence River and Great Lakes to the watersheds of the Mississippi and Rainy Rivers via the Savanna Portage; the latter basin could also be reached from the east by the Pigeon River, the main route of the fur brigades to the interior of Upper Canada.
