= Stony Hill School (Waubeka, Wisconsin) =

- U.S. National Register of Historic Places
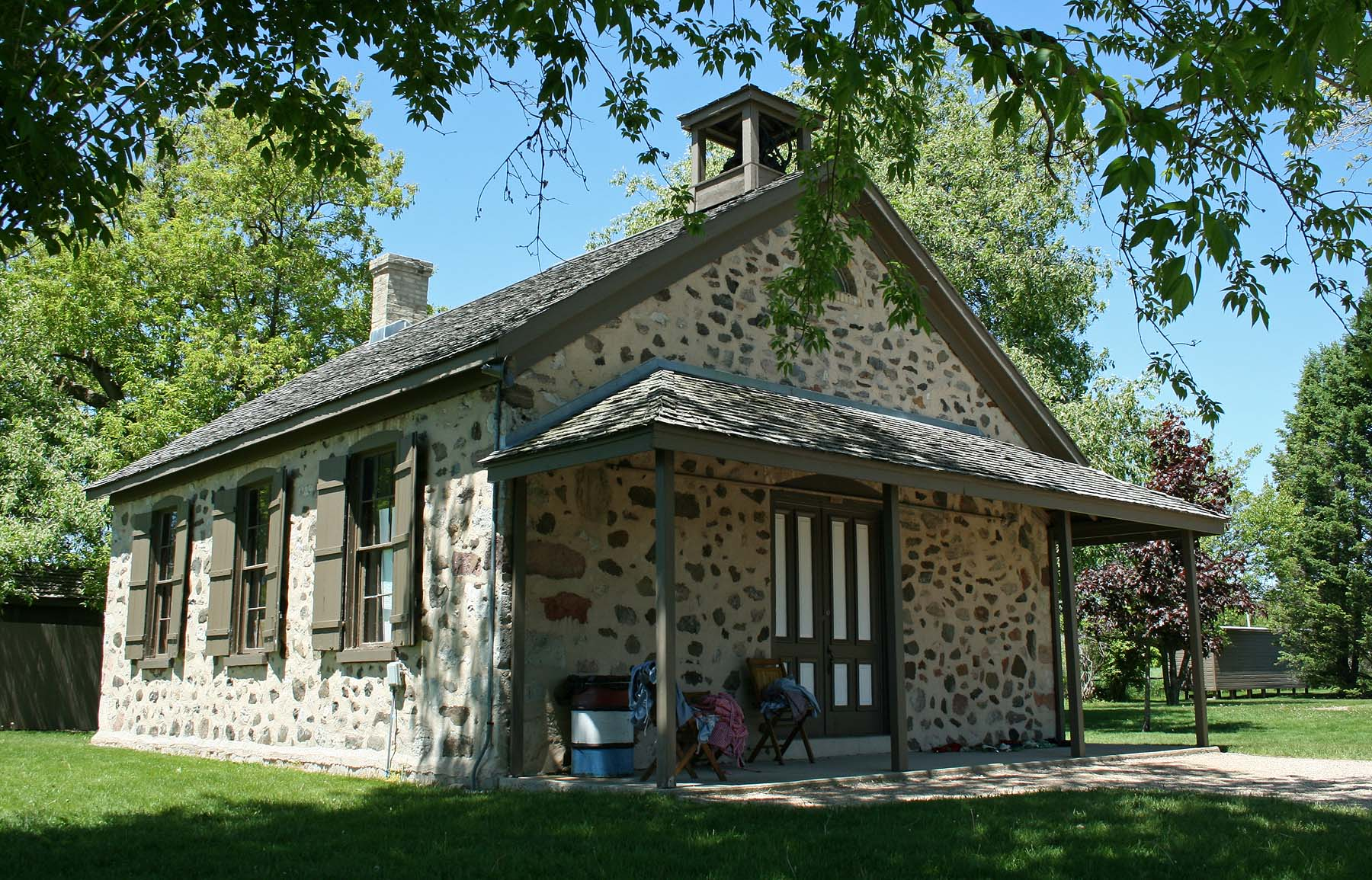
- Stony Hill School

- Location within Wisconsin Location within the United States
- Nearest city: Waubeka, Wisconsin
- Coordinates: 43°28′46″N 87°58′48″W
- Area: 1 acre (0.40 ha)
- Built: 1885
- NRHP reference No.: 76000072
- Added to NRHP: October 8, 1976

The Stony Hill School is a one-room school where on June 14, 1885, the teacher and his students held the first observance of "Flag Birth Day." For this, the site was added to the National Register of Historic Places in 1976.

== History ==
The 19-year-old teacher at the school, Bernard J. Cigrand, had a profound love for the flag of the United States. Cigrand began specially honoring the flag on June 14, 1885, at the school, the anniversary of the flag's adoption. In 1916, inspired by Cigrand's actions, President Woodrow Wilson proclaimed June 14 to be Flag Day, though the day was not officially established by an Act of Congress until 1949, and Cigrand became known as the "Father of Flag Day". Coincidentally, the school ceased operations in 1916. In 1947, the National Fraternal Congress moved for the school to be restored and by 1952 the restorations were complete.

The school was built some time before 1880, a small one-room school with walls of fieldstone rubble, and with a hip-roofed porch across the front. The windows have board shutters.

The school is now a museum and is a site of annual Flag Day celebrations.
