= Flag Day (United States) =

Holiday commemorating the adoption of the national flag (June 14, 1777)

U.S. Flag Day
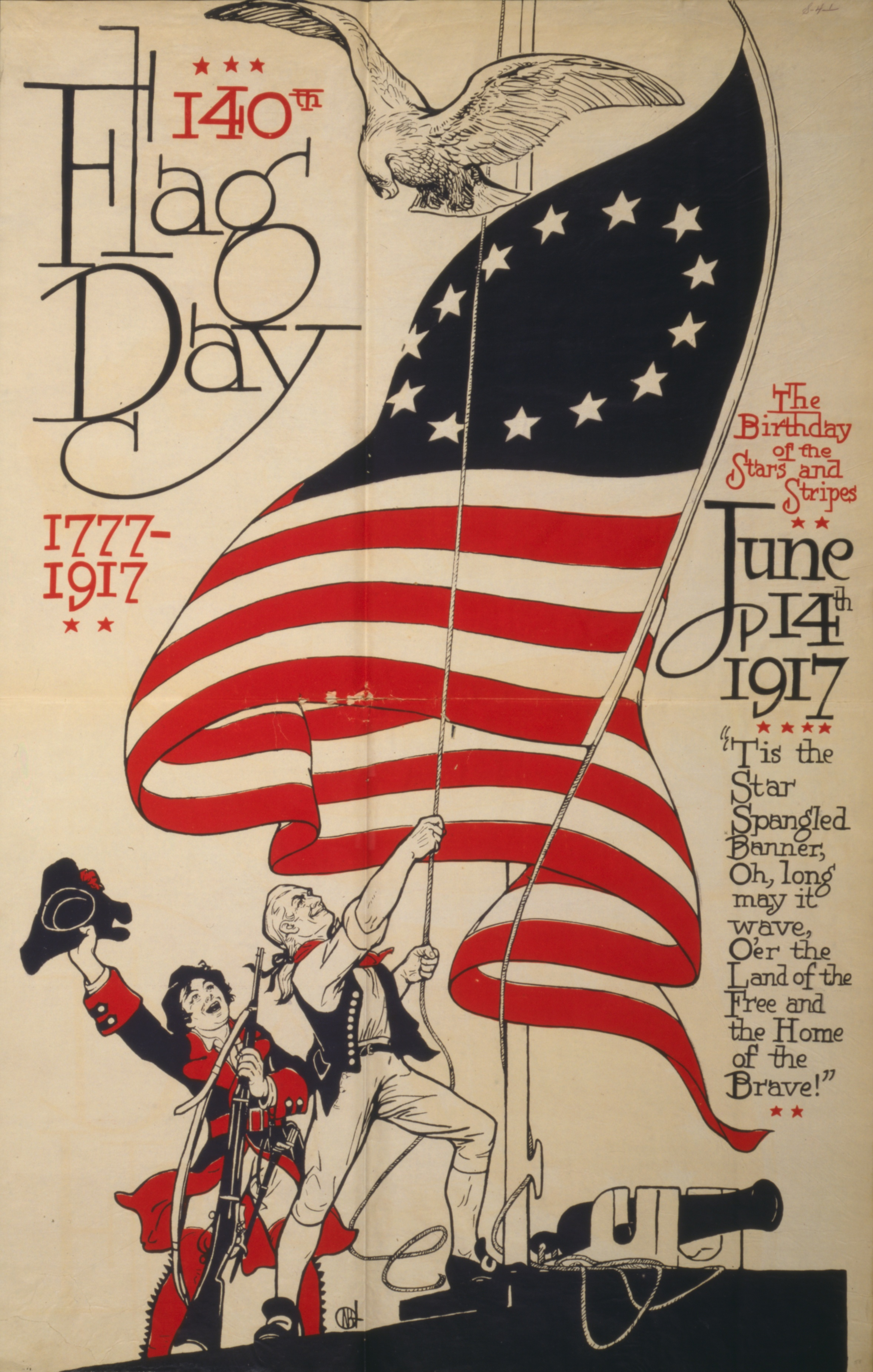
- Poster commemorating the 140th Flag Day on June 14, 1917
- Observed by: United States
- Date: June 14
- Next time: June 14, 2027
- Frequency: Annual

Flag Day is a holiday celebrated on June 14 in the United States. It commemorates the adoption of the flag of the United States on June 14, 1777, by resolution of the Second Continental Congress. The Flag Resolution stated "That the flag of the thirteen United States be thirteen stripes, alternate red and white; that the union be thirteen stars, white in a blue field, representing a new constellation."

Flag Day was first proposed in 1861 to rally support for the Union side of the American Civil War. In 1916, President Woodrow Wilson issued a presidential proclamation that designated June 14 as Flag Day. On August 3, 1949, National Flag Day was officially established by an Act of Congress. On June 14, 1937, Pennsylvania became the first state to celebrate Flag Day as a state holiday, beginning in the town of Rennerdale. New York Consolidated Laws designate the second Sunday in June as Flag Day, a state holiday.

Flag Day is not an official federal holiday. Federal law leaves it to the discretion of the president to officially proclaim the observance. Title 36 of the United States Code, Subtitle I, Part A, Chapter 1, Section 110 is the official statute on Flag Day. The United States Army—founded June 14, 1775 in the immediate lead-up to the Battle of Bunker Hill as the Continental Army a year-plus before U.S. independence was declared and two years exactly before the flag's adoption by Congress—also celebrates its birthday as June 14, 1775.

== History ==
Flag of the United States

Several people and organizations played instrumental roles in the establishment of a national Flag Day celebration. They are identified here in chronological order.

=== 1861, Civil War ===
The holiday was first proposed shortly after the 1861 attack on Fort Sumter that started the Civil War. The flag flying over the fort was saved by Union soldiers during the Confederate takeover. The Fort Sumter Flag became a symbol of opposition to the Confederate rebellion. Fame transformed the flag from a fairly obscure military symbol used to identify American ships and forts into a popular symbol used by ordinary Americans to support the Union cause.

Fort Sumter Flag

A day to celebrate the newly popular flag was proposed by Charles Dudley Warner in Hartford, Connecticut. This embrace of the flag coincided with new technology that allowed flags to be printed on a single piece of cloth, rather than stitched together by hand from multiple colors of cloth. This allowed flags to be mass produced for the public for the first time.

=== 1885, Bernard J. Cigrand ===
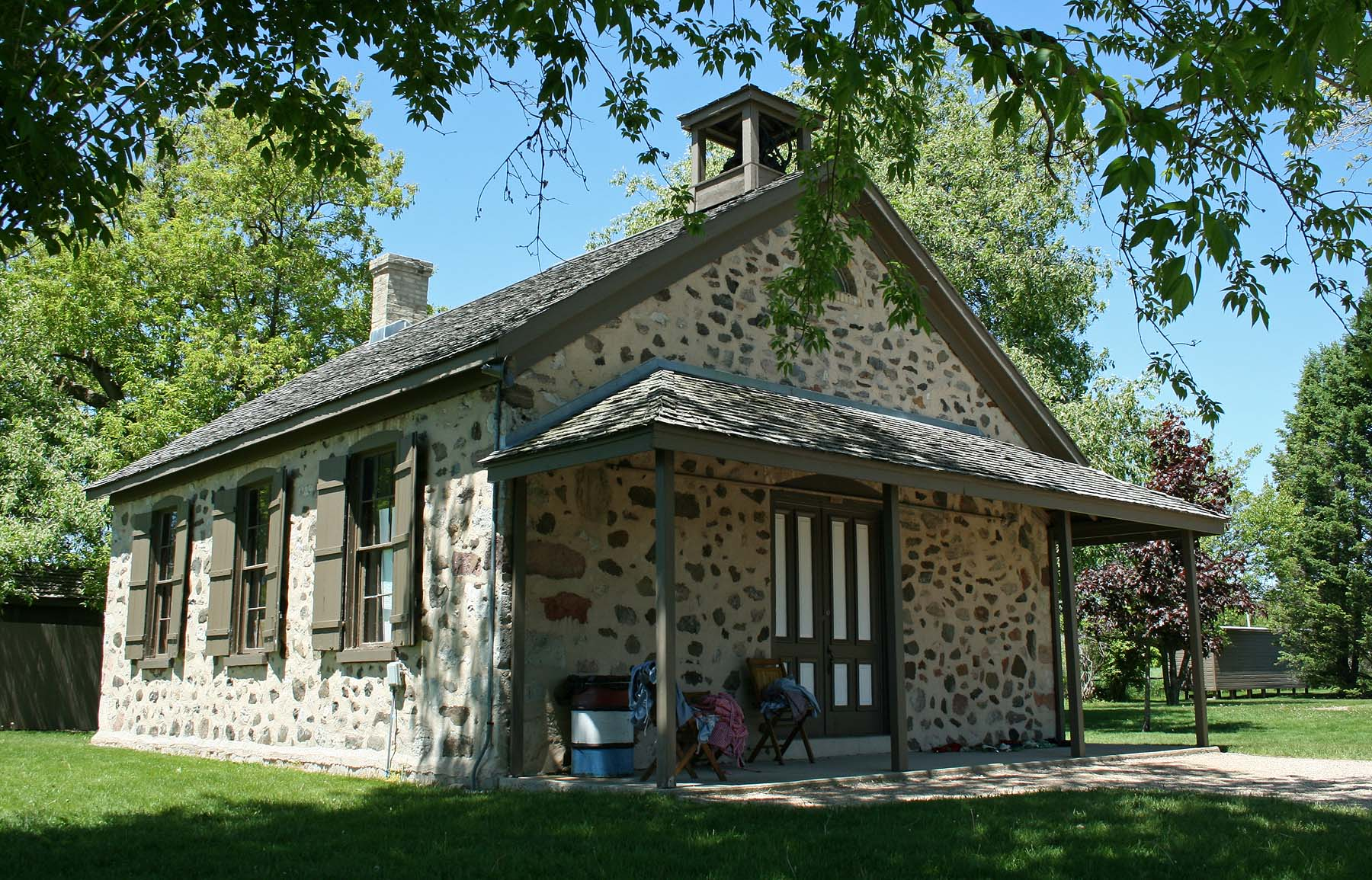
Stony Hill School, in Waubeka, Wisconsin, the site of the first formal observance of Flag Day

The US flag as it was in 1885, with 38 stars

Working as a grade school teacher in Waubeka, Wisconsin, in 1885, Bernard J. Cigrand held the first recognized formal observance of Flag Day at the Stony Hill School. The school has been restored, and a bust of Cigrand also honors him at the National Flag Day Americanism Center in Waubeka.

From the late 1880s on, Cigrand spoke around the country promoting patriotism, respect for the flag, and the need for the annual observance of a flag day on June 14, the day in 1777 that the Continental Congress adopted the Stars and Stripes.

He moved to Chicago to attend dental school and, in June 1886, first publicly proposed an annual observance of the birth of the United States flag in an article titled "The Fourteenth of June," published in the Chicago Argus newspaper. In June 1888, Cigrand advocated establishing the holiday in a speech before the "Sons of America," a Chicago group. The organization founded a magazine, American Standard, in order to promote reverence for American emblems. Cigrand was appointed editor-in-chief and wrote articles in the magazine as well as in other magazines and newspapers to promote the holiday.

On the third Saturday in June 1894, a public school children's celebration of Flag Day took place in Chicago at Douglas, Garfield, Humboldt, Lincoln, and Washington Parks. More than 300,000 children participated, and the celebration was repeated the next year.

Cigrand became president of the American Flag Day Association and later of the National Flag Day Society, which allowed him to promote his cause with organizational backing. Cigrand once noted he had given 2,188 speeches on patriotism and the flag. After 30 years of advocacy, in 1916, President Woodrow Wilson declared June 14 Flag Day.

Cigrand generally is credited with being the "Father of Flag Day," with the Chicago Tribune noting that he "almost singlehandedly" established the holiday.

=== 1888, William T. Kerr ===
William T. Kerr, a native of Pittsburgh and later a resident of Yeadon, Pennsylvania, founded the American Flag Day Association of Western Pennsylvania in 1888, and became the national chairman of the American Flag Day Association one year later, serving as such for fifty years. He attended President Harry S. Truman's 1949 signing of the Act of Congress that formally established the observance.

=== 1889, George Bolch ===
In 1889, the principal of a free kindergarten, George Bolch, celebrated the Revolution and celebrated Flag Day, as well.

=== 1891, Sarah Hinson ===
Sarah Hinson, a school teacher in Buffalo, NY began Flag Day exercises, (teaching the children to salute the Flag and repeat the Pledge of Allegiance) to instill in her pupils proper respect for the nation's flag, holding the first ceremony in 1891. She chose June 14 because that was the day in 1777 when the Continental Congress accepted the design of the "American" Flag.

=== 1893, Elizabeth Duane Gillespie ===
In 1893, Elizabeth Duane Gillespie, a descendant of Benjamin Franklin and the president of the Colonial Dames of Pennsylvania, attempted to have a resolution passed requiring the American flag to be displayed on all Philadelphia's public buildings. In 1937, Pennsylvania became the first state to make Flag Day a legal holiday.

The Elizabeth Duane Gillespie Junior High School was added to the National Register of Historic Places in 1989.

=== 1907, Benevolent and Protective Order of Elks ===
American fraternal order and social club the Benevolent and Protective Order of Elks has celebrated the holiday since the early days of the organization and allegiance to the flag is a requirement of every member. In 1907, the BPOE Grand Lodge designated by resolution June 14 as Flag Day. The Grand Lodge of the Order adopted mandatory observance of the occasion by every Lodge in 1911, and that requirement continues.

The Elks prompted President Woodrow Wilson to recognize the Order's observance of Flag Day for its patriotic expression.

=== 1913, City of Paterson, New Jersey ===
During the 1913 Paterson silk strike, IWW leader "Big" Bill Haywood asserted that someday all of the world's flags would be red, "the color of the working man's blood." In response, the city's leaders (who opposed the strike) declared March 17 to be "Flag Day," and saw to it that each of the city's textile mills flew an American flag. This attempt by Paterson's leaders to portray the strikers as un-American backfired when the strikers marched through the city with American flags of their own along with a banner that stated:

WE WEAVE THE FLAG

WE LIVE UNDER THE FLAG

WE DIE UNDER THE FLAG

BUT NOT IF WE'LL STARVE UNDER THE FLAG.

== World War II rebranding as United Nations Day ==
48-star flag

For Flag Day 1942, President Franklin D. Roosevelt launched an international United Flag Day or United Nations Day, celebrating solidarity among the World War II Allies, six months after the Declaration by United Nations. It was observed in New York City as the New York at War parade, and throughout the United States and internationally from 1942 to 1944.

== Observance of Flag Day ==
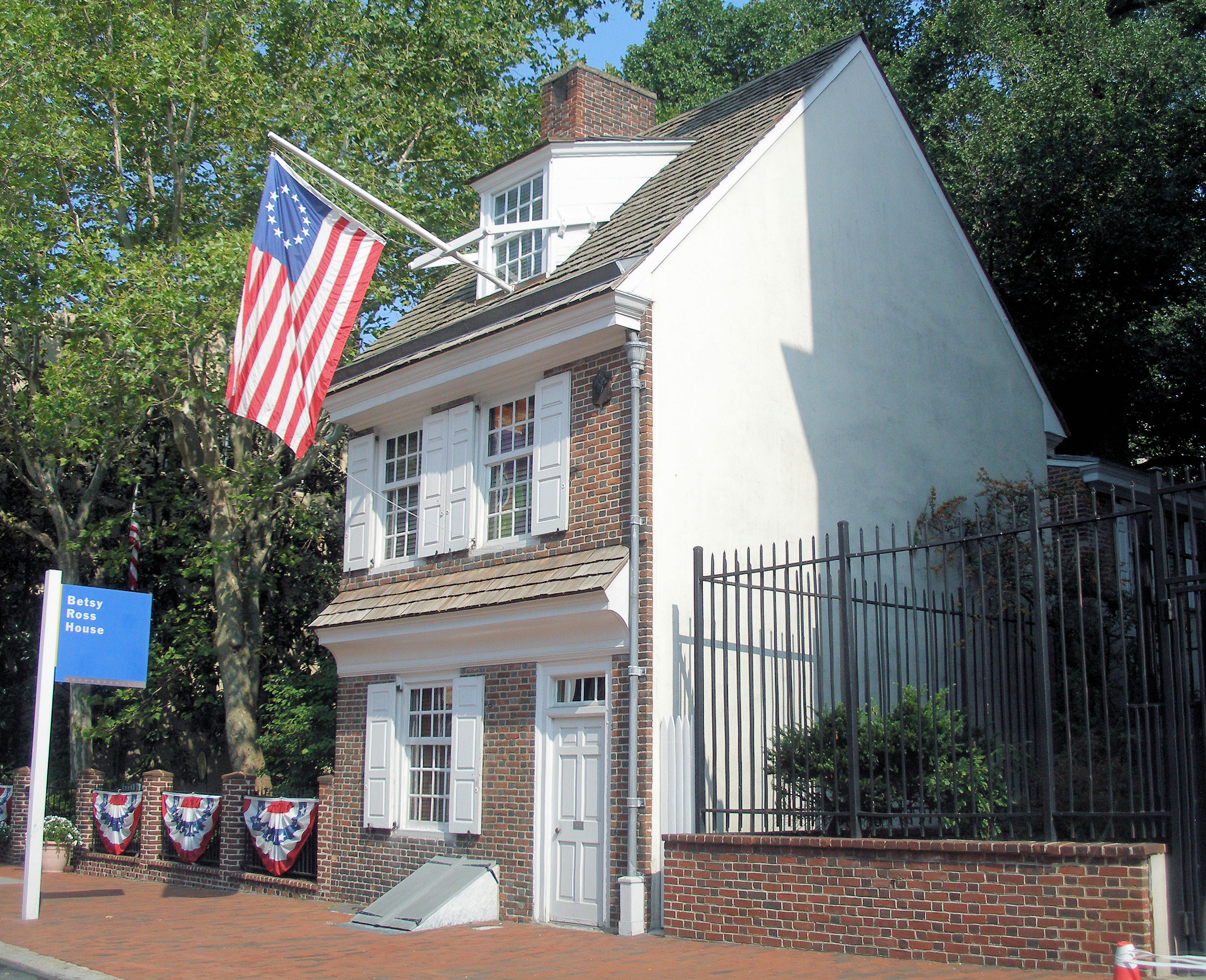
The Betsy Ross House, Philadelphia

The week of June 14 (June 08–14, 2025; June 14–20, 2026; June 13–19, 2027) is designated as National Flag Week. During National Flag Week, the president issues a proclamation "urging the people to observe the day as the anniversary of the adoption on June 14, 1777, by the Continental Congress of the Stars and Stripes as the official flag of the United States of America". The flag should also be displayed on all government buildings. Some places, such as the towns of Quincy and Dedham, Massachusetts, hold parades and events in celebration of America's national flag and everything it represents.

The National Flag Day Foundation also observes a Flag Day annually on the second Sunday in June (June 14, 2026, and June 13, 2027). The program includes a ceremonial raising of the national flag, a recitation of the Pledge of Allegiance, singing of the national anthem, a parade, and other events.

The Star-Spangled Banner Flag House in Baltimore, Maryland, birthplace of the 1813 flag that inspired Francis Scott Key to pen his famous poem a year later, has celebrated Flag Day since 1927. That year, a museum was created in the home of flag-banner-pennant maker Mary Pickersgill on the historic property.

The annual celebrations on Flag Day and also Defenders Day in Maryland (September 12, since 1814) commemorate the Star-Spangled Banner and Pickersgill for the huge emblem that flew over Fort McHenry guarding Baltimore Harbor during the British Royal Navy's three-day attack in the Battle of Baltimore during the War of 1812.

The Betsy Ross House has long been the site of Philadelphia's observance of Flag Day.

Coincidentally, June 14 is also the date for the annual anniversary of the Bear Flag Revolt in California. On June 14, 1846, 33 American settlers and mountain men arrested the Mexican general in command at Sonoma, and declared the "Bear Flag Republic" on the Pacific coast as an independent nation. A flag emblazoned with a bear, a red stripe, a star and the words "California Republic" was raised to symbolize independence from Mexico of the former province of Alta California. The Bear Flag was adopted as California's state flag upon joining the Union as the 31st state in 1850, after being annexed by the United States following the Mexican–American War of 1846–1849. Prominently flying both the US and state flags on June 14 is a tradition for some Californians.

Under a December 2025 directive by the Trump Administration, entrance to United States national parks is free on Flag Day, which coincides with Donald Trump's birthday; while the previously free entry on Martin Luther King Jr. Day and Juneteenth was revoked.

Flag Day has been parodied in media, such as The Simpsons season 13 episode "A Hunka Hunka Burns in Love."

== Local celebrations ==
Perhaps the oldest continuing Flag Day parade is in Fairfield, Washington. Beginning in 1909 or 1910, Fairfield has held a parade every year since, with the possible exception of 1918 and 2020, and celebrated the centennial parade in 2010, along with other commemorative events. Appleton, Wisconsin, claims to be the oldest National Flag Day parade in the nation, held annually since 1950.

Quincy, Massachusetts, has had an annual Flag Day parade since 1952 and claims that it "is the longest-running parade of its kind" in the U.S. From 1967 to 2017, the largest Flag Day parade was held annually in Troy, New York, which based its parade on the Quincy parade and typically drew 50,000 spectators. In addition, the Three Oaks, Michigan, Flag Day Parade is held annually on the weekend of Flag Day and is a three-day event. It claims to have the largest flag day parade in the nation as well as the oldest.
