= Southeastern Wisconsin Till Plains =

Ecoregion in Wisconsin and Illinois, United States

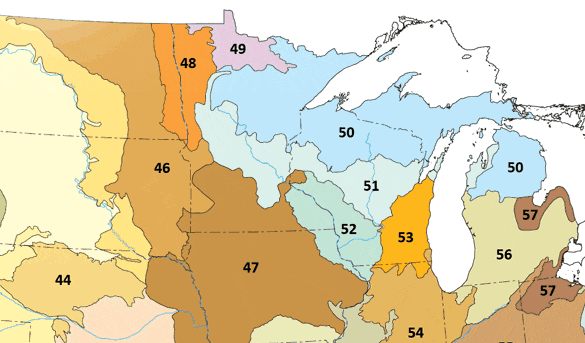
- Map of ecoregions of the Upper Midwest, with Southeastern Wisconsin Till Plains shown as number 53

Ecology
- Realm: Nearctic

Geography
- Country: United States
- States: Wisconsin; Illinois

The Southeastern Wisconsin Till Plains is an ecoregion in southeastern Wisconsin and northeastern Illinois in the United States. It is a Level III ecoregion in the classification system of the United States Environmental Protection Agency (EPA), where it is designated as ecoregion number 53. The ecoregion represents a transition between the hardwood forests and oak savannas to the west and the tallgrass prairie ecoregions to the south; it is today mostly covered by cropland.

== Level IV ecoregions ==
Following is a list of smaller Level IV ecoregions within the Southeastern Wisconsin Till Plains ecoregion, as defined by the EPA.

Number	Ecoregion name	Description
53a	Rock River Drift Plain	This region has numerous small creeks, a greater stream density, and fewer lakes than in ecoregions to the north and east; this is partly because its most recent glaciation was longer ago than in those ecoregions. The drift mantle is thin and deeply weathered with leached soils developed from a silt–loam cap of loess over glacial drift. Steeper topography and broad outwash plains with loamy and sandy soils also characterize this region.
53b	Kettle Moraines	This region contains a higher concentration of lakes with lower trophic states than in the other level IV ecoregions of the Southeastern Wisconsin Till Plains. The soils are clayey to the east, especially along the Lake Michigan shore, and more sandy to the west, but generally less clayey than the soils in ecoregion 53d to the north. The region also contains extensive ground and end moraines and pitted outwash with belts of hilly moraines and generally has greater relief than ecoregion 53d to the northeast.
53c	Southeastern Wisconsin Savannah and Till Plain	This region supports a mix of agriculture (mostly cropland and dairy operations) and woodland. Crops include forage crops to support the dairy operations and a wide range of truck and specialty crops. Most of the original vegetation has been cleared with forested areas remaining only on steeper end moraines and poorly drained depressions. Irregular till plains, end moraines, kettles, and drumlins are common, and wetlands are found throughout the region, especially along end morainal ridges. The potential natural vegetation (PNV) of this region is transitional with a mosaic of sugar maple, basswood, and oak to the east and an increasing amount of white, black, and bur oak, oak savanna, prairie, and sedge meadows toward the west.
53d	Lake Michigan Lacustrine Clay Plain	This region is characterized by red chalky clay soil, lacustrine and till deposits, and a flat plain. The topography is much flatter than in regions to the south and there are fewer lakes; however, the lakes have generally higher trophic states than in adjacent level IV ecoregions. Soils are generally silty and loamy over calcareous loamy till, with muck and loamy lacustrine soils in low–lying areas. There is more prime farmland in this region with a longer growing season and more fertile soils than in surrounding ecoregions. Agriculture has a different mosaic of crops, with more fruit and vegetable crops than that of ecoregion 53c. The PNV of this region is beech/sugar maple/basswood/red and white oak forests with a greater concentration of beech than other ecoregions in 53.

== See also ==
- List of ecoregions in the United States (EPA)
- List of ecoregions in North America (CEC)
- List of ecoregions in Wisconsin
- Geography of Wisconsin
- Climate of Wisconsin
