= WITI TV Tower =

Communications tower in Wisconsin, US

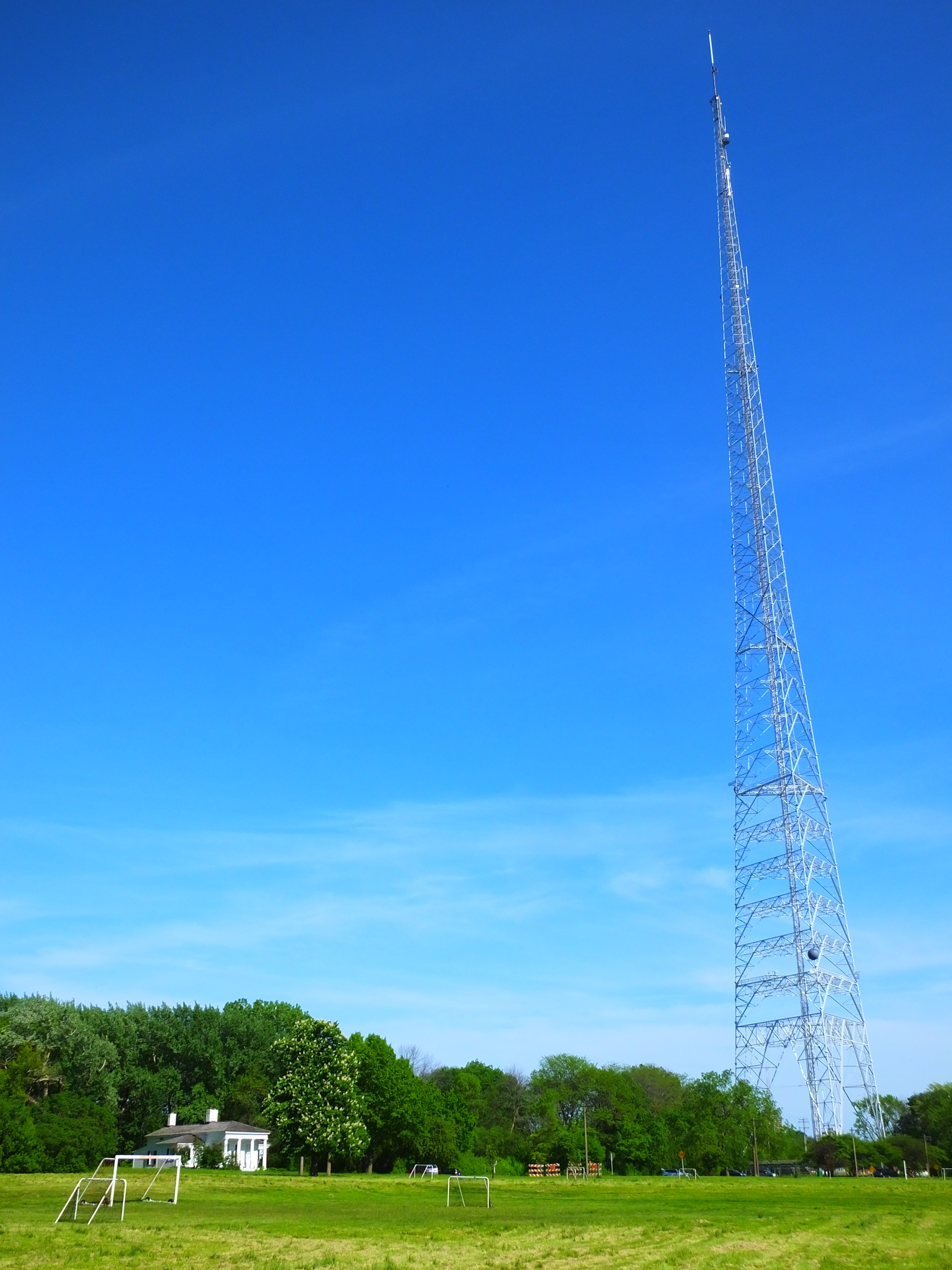
- WITI's transmitter tower and the Benjamin Church house in Estabrook Park.

- Location within the United States

General information
- Status: Completed
- Type: Steel lattice television tower
- Location: Milwaukee, Wisconsin
- Coordinates: 43°05′26″N 87°53′50″W
- Completed: 1962

Height
- Height: 329.4 m (1,081 ft)

The WITI TV Tower is a lattice communications tower located in Shorewood, Wisconsin, which transmits the signal of several television and radio stations in the Milwaukee area, including its namesake, Fox owned-and-operated station WITI (channel 6), along with cellular and Wireless communications. The structure is owned by WITI's parent company, Fox Television Stations. The 1,081 feet (329 m) tower built in 1962 was for many years the tallest free-standing tower in the United States until the Stratosphere Tower was built in 1996. It remains the tallest lattice tower in the country and the tallest 3-side lattice tower in the world.

== History ==
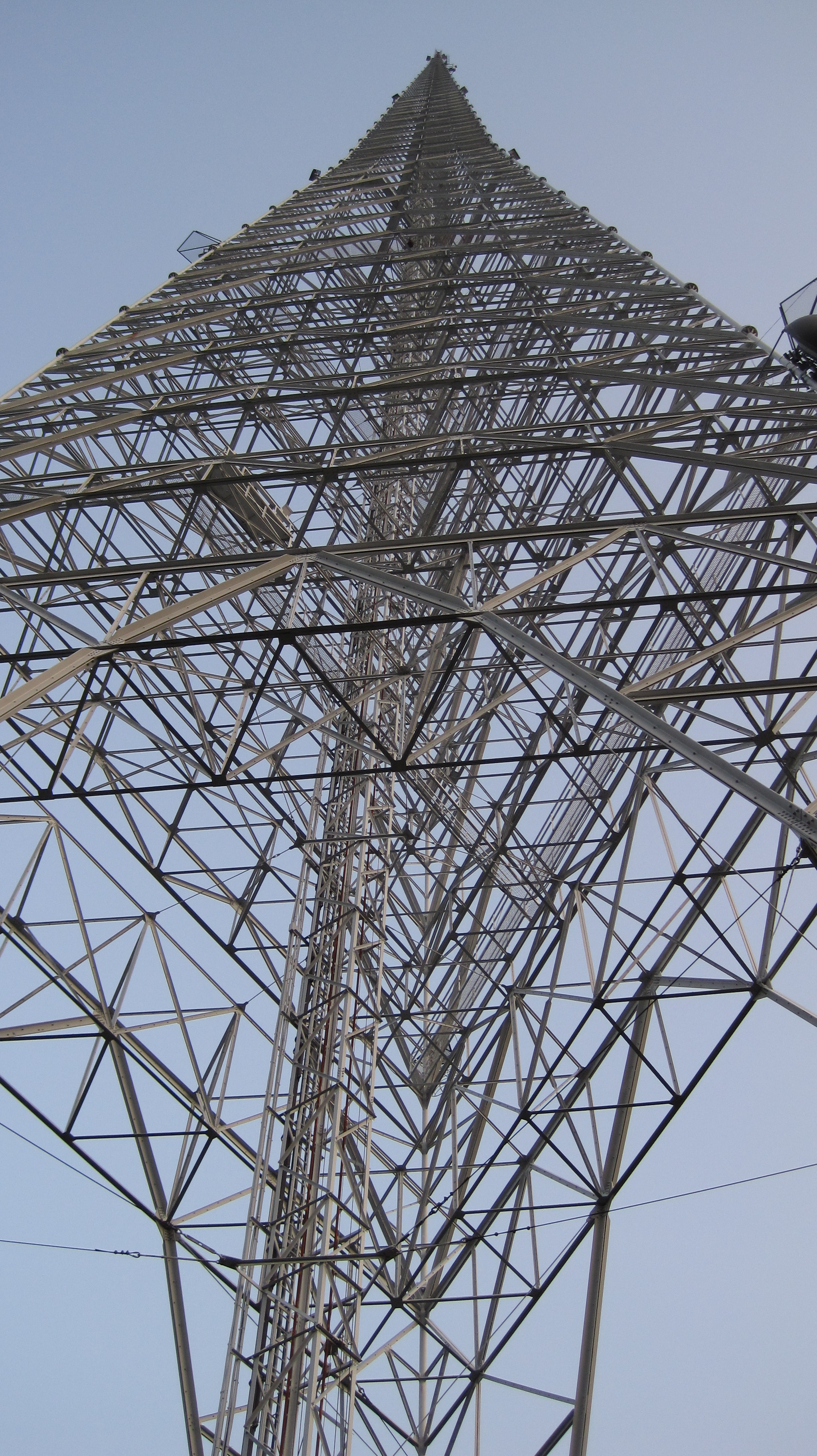
View of the tower from its base

The tower was built after FCC relaxed earlier tight guidelines on station co-location as the various characteristics of the signal ranges for VHF television and FM signals were shown in everyday consumer use.

In 1956, WITI came to the air as an independent station, but had to deal with interference issues with two other channel 6 stations in adjacent states while trying to come on the air. The most obvious issue involved WJIM-TV in Lansing, Michigan. Television stations in western and central Michigan are subject to tropospheric propagation, along with the flat waters of Lake Michigan effectively allowing the western signal radius of those stations to be amplified across the lake and into the communities along the lake's western shore in eastern Wisconsin and Illinois (and vice versa those stations into Michigan), causing interference between the two stations that did not exist with the market's other stations. WTMJ-TV broadcast on channel 4, with the nearest adjacent channel 4 being WWJ-TV in Detroit, while WISN-TV's channel 12 was unfettered for two more years before Flint, Michigan's WJRT-TV came on the air. The FCC also cited that WOC-TV of Davenport, Iowa had some interference from WITI in small portions of their own market area (another station in the Quad Cities region, WHBF-TV, also broadcast on channel 4, which later forced a shift in Chicago and Milwaukee's channel plans in 1953 due to Chicago's channel 4 causing havoc with several adjacent markets, including the Quad Cities and Kalamazoo, Michigan; this included WTMJ-TV moving from channel 3 to channel 4, and Chicago's channel 4 to shift over to channel 2, today's WBBM-TV).

As such, WITI thus launched being licensed to the North Shore suburb of Whitefish Bay, with a tower located in Ozaukee County in the then-Town of Mequon to address the Lansing and Davenport interference issues. This proved disadvantageous to WITI because viewers in the area had to aim their antennas more northward or northeastward to receive WITI, where the city's other stations were centrally located north of downtown. In 1958, WITI would be purchased by Storer Broadcasting and would acquire the market's CBS affiliation in 1959, then switched to ABC in 1961, with that affiliate switch partially due to WISN-TV (channel 12)'s more central signal. The station would continue to campaign the FCC to relocate its city of license to Milwaukee, along with its transmitter site, and finally was successful in doing so in 1962. However, the appropriate area to build the tower was Milwaukee's north side (as the south side's Mitchell International Airport prevented any location of broadcast towers in that area), and with most of the prime in-city sites already taken by other radio and television stations, WITI would instead be required to locate the tower in a nearby suburb just outside the Milwaukee city limits.

The village of Shorewood allowed WITI to build the tower on a piece of privately owned land that otherwise would have completed the Estabrook Parkway along the Milwaukee River, which would increase the village's property tax base (though the road was eventually completed through the tower property). The WTMJ-TV/FM tower was directly across the river to the west behind The Milwaukee Journal's "Radio City" studios for the WTMJ stations, with the WISN-TV/FM tower 2.15 miles (3.46 km) northwest in Lincoln Park (Weigel Broadcasting's WDJT-TV would build their own Lincoln Park tower in 1999), along with the eventual WVTV (channel 18) tower nearby (that station, along with WDJT and WMKE-LP, all originally utilized a transmitter tower atop the Hilton Milwaukee City Center downtown), and locating the tower there meant that viewers throughout the Milwaukee market could point their antennae in the same general direction.

An issue with the tower's location is that the west side of the property is along the Milwaukee River, within Estabrook Park. As guy wires could not be placed on the parkland or into the river, the structure would have to be free-standing by design. The Bentley Company was the contractor building the tower's foundation, with Dresser Ideco constructing the actual structure, and Seago Construction Co. erecting the tower. Consistent with Storer's exterior studio and transmitter architecture standards, the transmitter building itself is of faux-Georgian architecture design.

In August 1962, construction of the 1,081 feet (329 m) tower was completed. It was formally dedicated on October 9, 1962. Storer looked for a way to make the tower a Milwaukee landmark, and in October 1963, the station received permission from the Shorewood village board to install additional non-navigational lights on the structure. Shortly thereafter, approximately 2,000 lights, each light 25 watts, were installed. Station manager Roger LeGrand then coined the phrase "Milwaukee's Tower of Light". Some neighbors objected. The Shorewood village attorney opined that a lighted "6" sign (rendered in the Eurostile font used by the station from 1962 until 1973, then again from 1998 until 2002) might violate the village's lighted sign ordinance, but that the lights affixed to the tower's legs were legal. The village later declared the lights and the sign to be legal. Except for special requests – such as to aid navigation on Lake Michigan during sailing races – the tower was only lit from local sunset until midnight.

The lights stayed on until the energy crisis of 1973-74, when a viewer suggestion permanently darkened the lighting, though the maintenance costs of the lighting were already high due to winter and spring atmospheric icing which would rain higher-up icicles onto the lighting, constantly breaking bulbs (the icing also occasionally requires the area around the tower to be closed for safety reasons). The strands remained dormant upon the tower legs until 2003, when they, along with the giant "6" sign, were removed as the station fitted the tower for digital broadcasting.

Outside WITI, the city's public broadcasting and religious broadcasters have an extensive history with the structure. Milwaukee Public Television leased space on the tower for WMVS (channel 10) and WMVT (channel 36) until a move to WVTV's tower in 1981 (with all three stations, and WCGV-TV (channel 24) moving to the nearby digital-ready Milwaukee PBS Tower in 1999, which does have guy wires over the Milwaukee River terminating on the river's east bank). WYMS (88.9) and WUWM (89.7) have been long-term tenants of the tower dating to the 1970s, along with Family Radio's WMWK (88.1) coming online in the early 1990s. Ion Television's Kenosha-licensed WPXE-TV (channel 55) would begin to transmit from the tower in the late 2000s to centralize their digital signal. WVCY-TV (channel 30) became another tenant of the tower in 2018 as part of a channel sharing agreement using WITI's existing spectrum (which was relocated to digital channel 31 in fall 2019, requiring new transmitter work that year). In November 2019, W269DL (101.7), a translator of WGKB (1510), began to also transmit from the tower.

The Tower is located off of the Oak Leaf Trail, just north of Capitol Drive in Shorewood, Wisconsin (north of the city of Milwaukee).

== Tower tenants ==
=== Television ===
Callsign	Virtual Channel	Physical Channel	Affiliation	Ownership
WITI	6	31	Fox owned & operated	Fox Television Stations
WVCY-TV	30	31	Religious independent	VCY America
WPXE-TV	55	30	Ion owned & operated	Ion Media (E. W. Scripps Company)

=== FM radio ===
Callsign	Frequency	Format	Owner
WMWK	88.1	Religious	Family Radio
WYMS	88.9	AAA/community	Milwaukee Public Schools (licensee); Radio Milwaukee (operator)
WUWM	89.7	Public radio/NPR	University of Wisconsin–Milwaukee
W269DL (WGKB translator)	101.7	Locally-based Black talk radio	Good Karma Brands (operator); New WRRD, LLC (licensee)

== See also ==
- Lattice tower
- List of tallest towers in the world
- List of tallest freestanding structures in the world
- List of tallest freestanding steel structures
- List of famous transmission sites
