= Benjamin Church =

Benjamin Church may refer to:

- Benjamin Church (physician) (1734–1778), effectively the first Surgeon General of the U.S. Army
- Benjamin Church (ranger) (1639–1718), considered the father of the U.S. Army Rangers
- Benjamin Church (carpenter) (1807–1887), pioneer carpenter and builder in Milwaukee, Wisconsin
