= Benjamin Church House (Shorewood, Wisconsin) =

Historic house in Wisconsin, United States

Coordinates: 43°5′31.7″N 87°53′54″W

- U.S. National Register of Historic Places
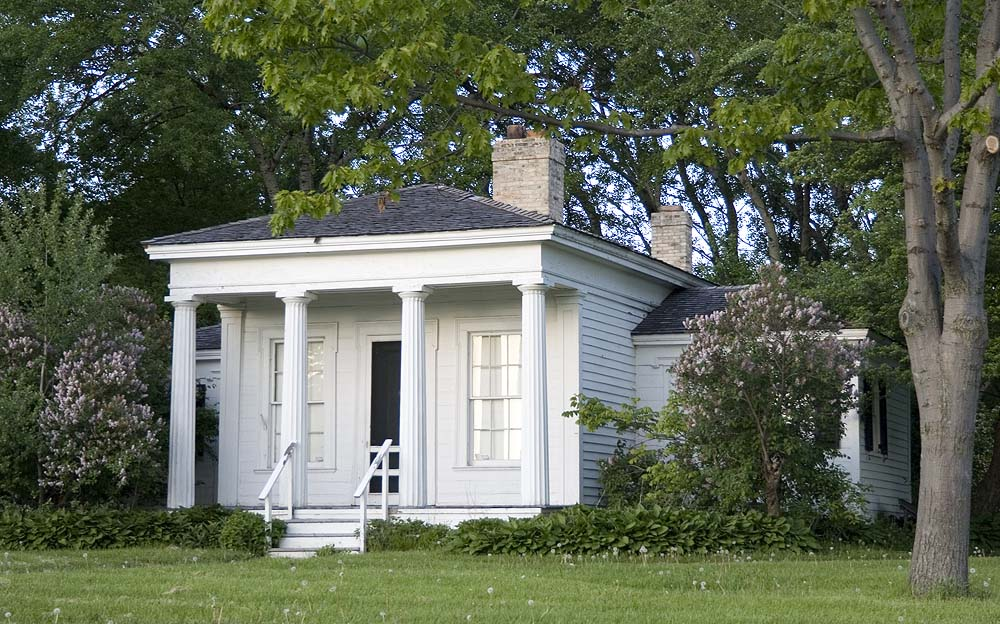
- Location: Parkway Drive, Estabrook Park; Shorewood, Wisconsin
- Built: 1843-1844
- Architectural style: Greek Revival
- NRHP reference No.: 72000059
- Added to NRHP: February 23, 1972

The Benjamin Church House (also known as the Kilbourntown House), a modestly sized Temple-style Greek Revival home, was built in 1843–1844 by a pioneer carpenter of that name in Kilbourntown, a settlement on the west side of the Milwaukee River. In 1846, Kilbourntown merged with Juneautown on the east side of the river and Walker's Point to the south to create Milwaukee, today the largest city in Wisconsin. The house is thought to be Milwaukee's earliest surviving home.

== Description and history ==
The house was constructed in the American Greek Revival style with four fluted Doric columns out front and a symmetrical floor plan. The front entrance opens into a living room, with a dining room behind and then a kitchen. A bedroom wing is attached to each side. The style was also known as Greek temple or national style. The structure was for four decades the family home of Benjamin F. Church, his wife Pamelia Hall Clement, and their children including Hannah Maria, Ann Augusta, Charles Benj., John Benjamin and Susan. Benjamin, a native of Ulster County, New York, arrived in early Milwaukee on November 15, 1835, and later was a member of the Old Settlers Club. In addition to his carpentry and construction business, Benjamin held a number of local offices. Pamelia was born in New Hampshire as shown in the 1850 Census, specifically Pembroke as shown in the town history.

In 1884, the house was sold to George Binzel, a bookkeeper who eventually was assistant secretary of the Valentin Blatz Brewing Company. George was one of several Binzel brothers who came to southeast Wisconsin from Germany. In 1900, George, his wife Rosa, daughter Louise and sons Paul, Albert and Clarence lived in the house. The address in this period was 501 Fourth as seen in the 1875 Milwaukee City Directory.

The Binzel family sold the house and moved away on August 10, 1922. Due to financial difficulties on the part of those who purchased the house, the structure eventually went to the city for payment of taxes.

== Rescue and restoration ==
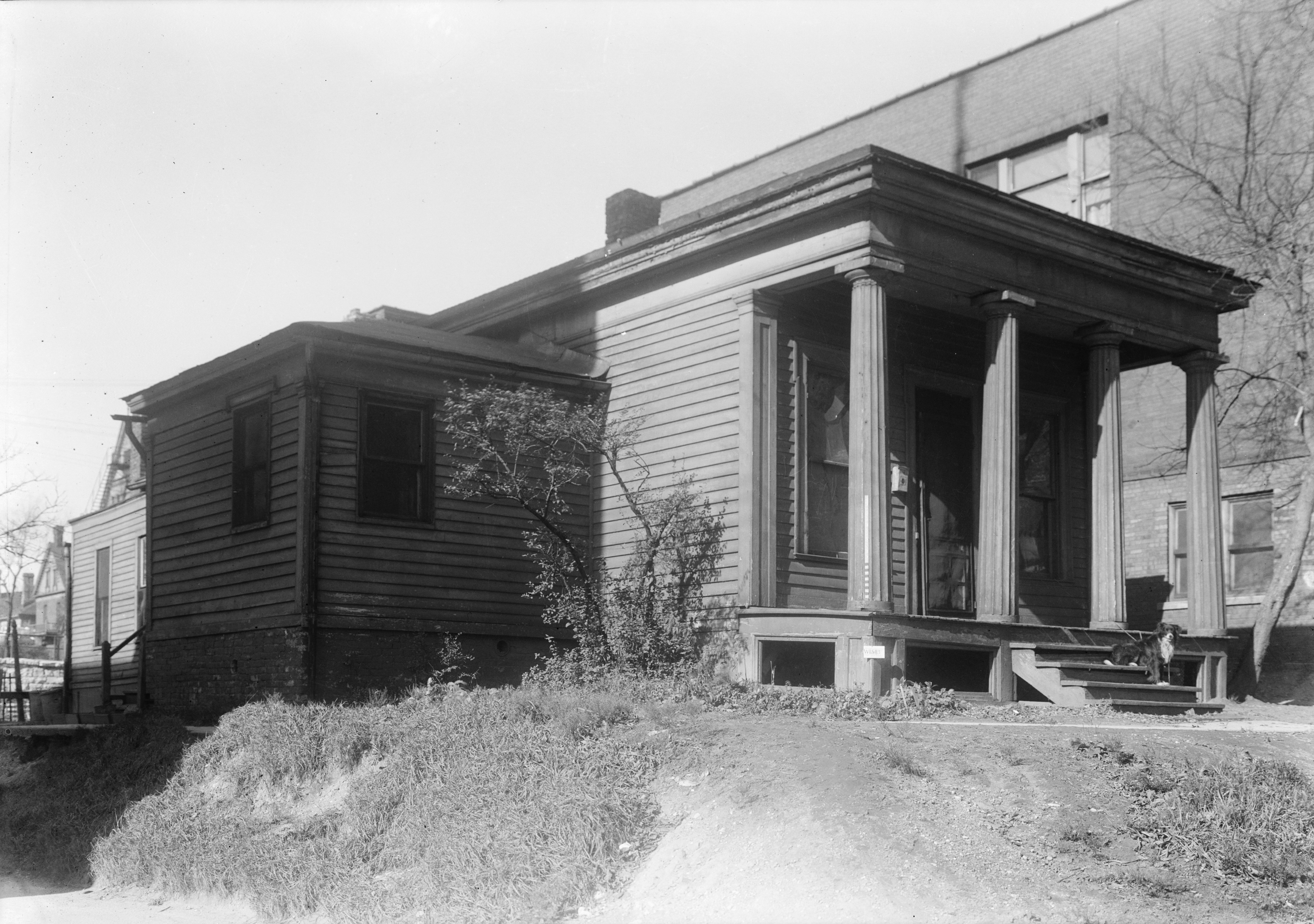
The house in its original location

In the 1930s, the house was recognized as having historical value worthy of rescue for future generations to enjoy. Local Cream City brick and hand-hewn timbers were among its distinctive features.

On July 20, 1936, the house was measured through the Historic American Buildings Survey. On August 21, 1936, architectural drawings of the house were prepared. At that time, due to a city renumbering project, the address of the house was 1533 North Fourth Street, Milwaukee. HABS documents state that the house was then owned by Louise Binzel.

Through the Works Progress Administration or WPA, the house was restored and moved in 1938 to Estabrook Park in Shorewood, Wisconsin, north of Milwaukee. Furnishings from the 19th century were provided by the Wisconsin Society of The National Society of The Colonial Dames of America.

== Today ==
The Church house, also known as the Kilbourntown House, is maintained today by the Milwaukee County Historical Society. It is open to the public on Sunday afternoons during June, July and August, with docent tours provided.
