= Benjamin Church (carpenter) =

American carpenter and politician

Benjamin F. Church (1807–1887) was a pioneer carpenter and builder in Milwaukee, Wisconsin, USA, listed among the city's first settlers of 1835. He helped to construct one of the city's first two big hotels and built a Greek Revival temple-style house for his family that today is a public museum in Estabrook Park, Shorewood, Wisconsin. He also held varied public offices and volunteer roles in the young city.

== Early life and education ==
Church was born in New Paltz, Ulster County, New York, on July 23, 1807. He was the fifth of ten children of Caleb Church and Hannah Baker Church. Caleb (1772–1856) was a farmer and cooper. Hannah (1775–1843) was a Quaker preacher who advocated for construction of a Quaker meeting house for Clintondale, New York, located in Plattekill Township, Ulster County.

Church was educated in carpentry and construction skills. His older brother, Samuel, received similar training in New York City.

In 1834, Church headed west to seek opportunities in the new states and territories of the upper Midwest. He went first to Chicago, Illinois, and then, in fall 1835, went north to the new settlements that became Milwaukee. He took a drove of hogs with him on the journey as a stake in his new location. The region of what is now Wisconsin was then still part of the Michigan Territory; the Territory of Wisconsin was established in 1836.

Church settled in Kilbourntown, the village on the west side of the Milwaukee River, named for its founder Byron Kilbourn. East of the river was Juneautown, named for its founder Solomon Juneau. To the south was Walker's Point, named for its founder George H. Walker. The three villages merged in 1846 as the City of Milwaukee.

== Career ==
In 1836, Church was either contractor or "boss carpenter" for the construction of Washington House, one of the first two big hotels in Milwaukee. It was located on Third Street in Juneautown. The hotel was renamed the Republican House soon after the founding of the Republican Party in 1854, and was a Milwaukee meeting place for many decades.

Also in 1836, he purchased land on Fourth Street between Cherry and Galena, at the intersection with Court Street. In 1844, he built his family home there using the Greek Revival architecture style he brought from the East Coast. The home was in Kilbourntown, the area west of the Milwaukee River.

On May 29, 1839, Church purchased 160 acres (0.65 km^{2}) in Section 31 of what is today Germantown. This was some of the first land to be purchased there. He and his wife sold the land the following year.

Carpentry and construction remained his career until he retired, except for a brief foray into pump manufacturing. Many pumps in those days were made of wood.

== Public service ==
Church was elected to a series of public service posts in Milwaukee. On January 1, 1844, he was elected one of five trustees of the West Ward and was re-elected in 1845. He, Kilbourn, and three others were the West Ward trustees at the historic first meeting on May 7, 1845, of representatives of all three wards of what became Milwaukee officially on January 31, 1846. The meeting occurred during the infamous "Milwaukee Bridge War".

During the 1850s, Church was elected to represent his ward on the Board of School Commissioners and to be an assessor for his ward.

== Delegate, founder or member ==
On February 16, 1844, Church was one of the five founders of Royal Arch Masons Chapter No. 1 in Milwaukee. In 1862, it was renamed the Kilbourn Chapter.

On July 5–7, 1847, he was among a large contingent of delegates from Milwaukee County to the River and Harbor Convention in Chicago. The convention drew 2,315 delegates from 19 states to advocate for federal support of improvements to inland rivers and harbors.

In 1854–1855, he was one of the seven founders and one of three original trustees of the Second Ward Cemetery Association, incorporated under Wisconsin state law.

Church was a member of Milwaukee's Old Settlers Club, founded in 1869. His entry in the membership rolls shows he was born on July 23, 1807, in Ulster County, New York, arrived in Milwaukee on November 15, 1835, and still lived in Milwaukee when the club was founded and its members signed the constitution.

== Family ==
Church and his wife Pamelia Hall Clement, who was born in 1815 in Pembroke, Merrimack County, New Hampshire, had six children. They were Hannah Maria, who married Sherman A. Bradley, a native of Connecticut; Ann Augusta or Anna, who married Henry C. Moore, a native of New Hampshire; Charles Benj. Church; Benjamin Church Jr.; John Benjamin Church who married Margaret Legard Gunyon, a native of England; and Susan.

== Benjamin Church House ==
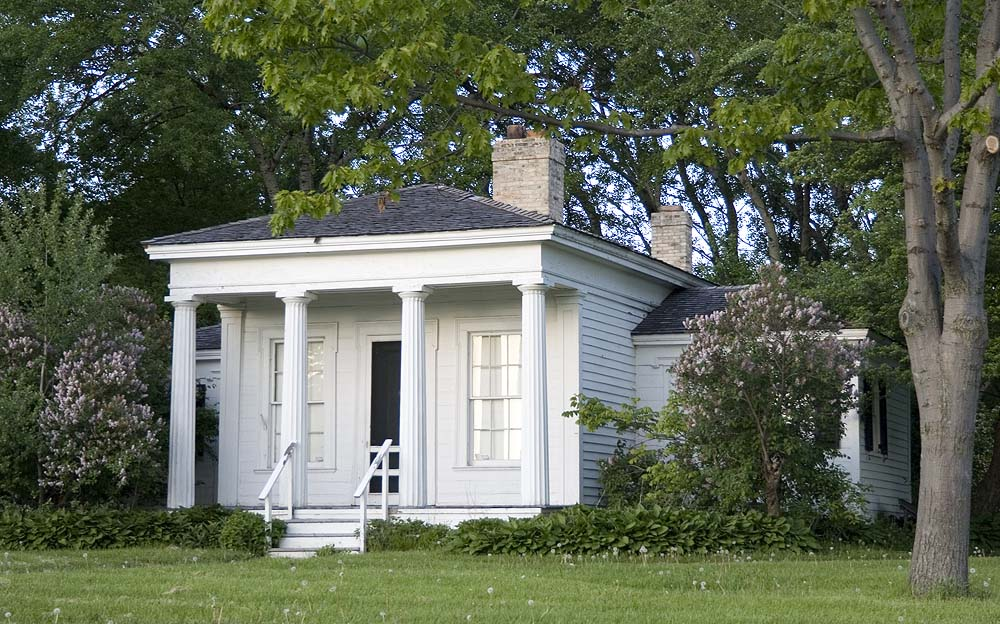
Benjamin Church House

In 1938, as a Works Progress Administration (WPA) project, the Benjamin Church House was rescued from its location in Milwaukee and moved to Estabrook Park just north of East Capitol Drive to serve as a public museum. Its Greek Revival architectural style, Doric columns, hand-hewn timbers, local bricks dated 1844 and other features gave it historic significance. Other partners in the rescue and restoration were the Milwaukee County Historical Society, the Milwaukee County Park Commission and The National Society of Colonial Dames in Wisconsin.

In 1972, the house was placed on the National Register of Historic Places. It is also known as Kilbourntown House, recognizing the part of Milwaukee where it was originally located. Today, the Milwaukee County Historical Society maintains the house and opens it to the public during the summer.

== Death ==
Church died November 29, 1887, in Milwaukee. His funeral was held on December 1, 1887, according to the Milwaukee historian James S. Buck's Pioneer History of Milwaukee. Buck officiated as marshal at this and many other Old Settlers Club members' funerals. Church is buried in Forest Home Cemetery along with many members of his family.
