= Estabrook Park =

Park in Milwaukee County, Wisconsin, United States

- Interactive map of Estabrook Park
- Location: Shorewood, Wisconsin, United States
- Coordinates: 43.098293°N 87.904689°W
- Area: 126.25 acres (51.09 ha)
- Created: 1916
- Operator: Milwaukee County Parks Department
- Website: https://county.milwaukee.gov/files/county/parks-department/Park-Maps/Estabrook1.pdf

Estabrook Park is a Milwaukee County park in the village of Shorewood, Wisconsin, United States. It is home to the 1,081 ft (329 m) WITI TV Tower and the historic Benjamin Church House. It was named for Charles E. Estabrook, a distinguished Wisconsin lawyer and politician, and is located on a nearly 125 acres (51 ha) strip of land between the Milwaukee River and the former Chicago and North Western Railway, now converted into part of the Oak Leaf Trail.

== Amenities ==
There are picnic areas, soccer fields, a disc golf course, a softball field, a dog park, a beach volleyball court, a skatepark, and the Estabrook Park Beer Garden.

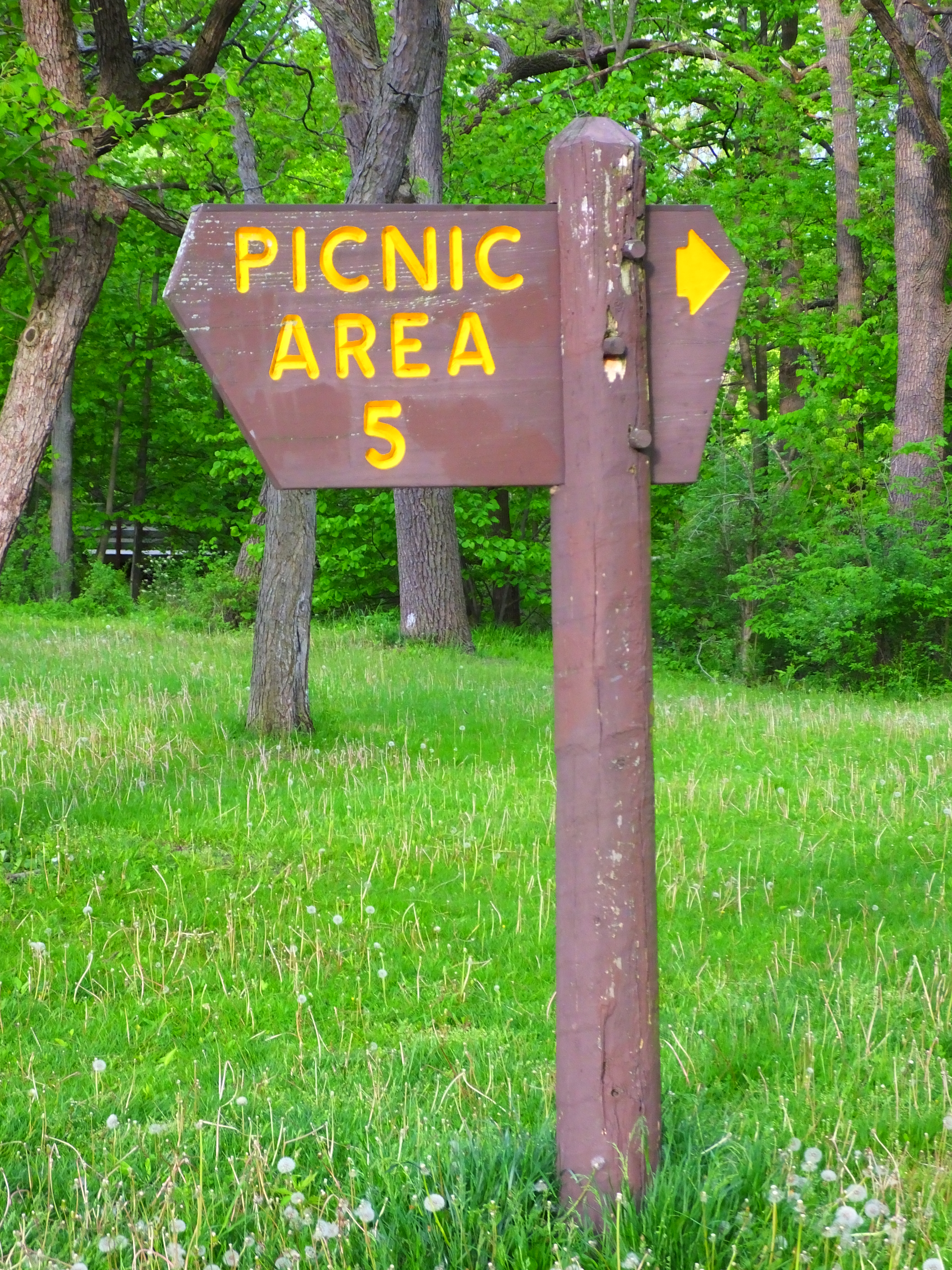
Picnic area signage

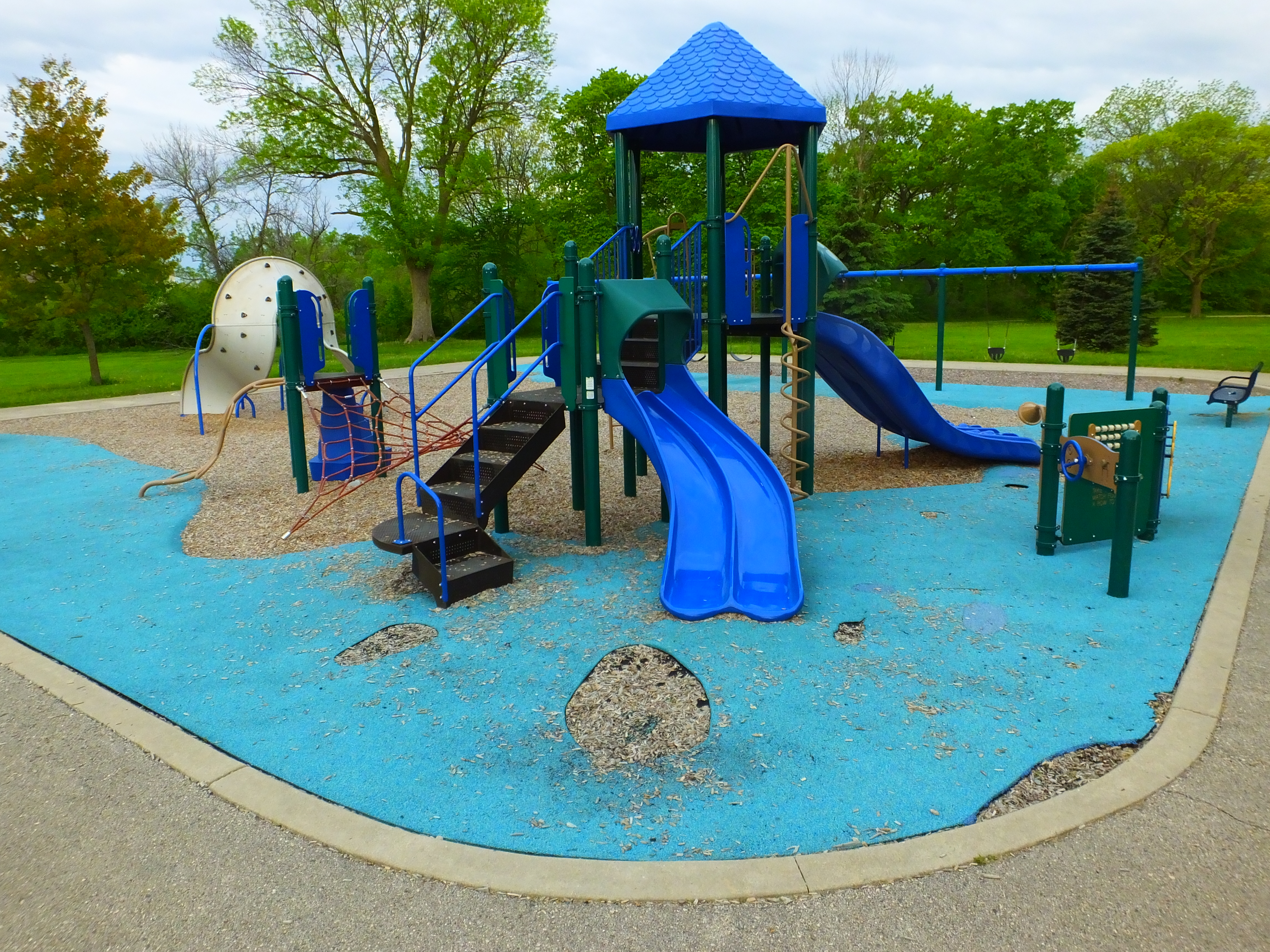
Northern playground

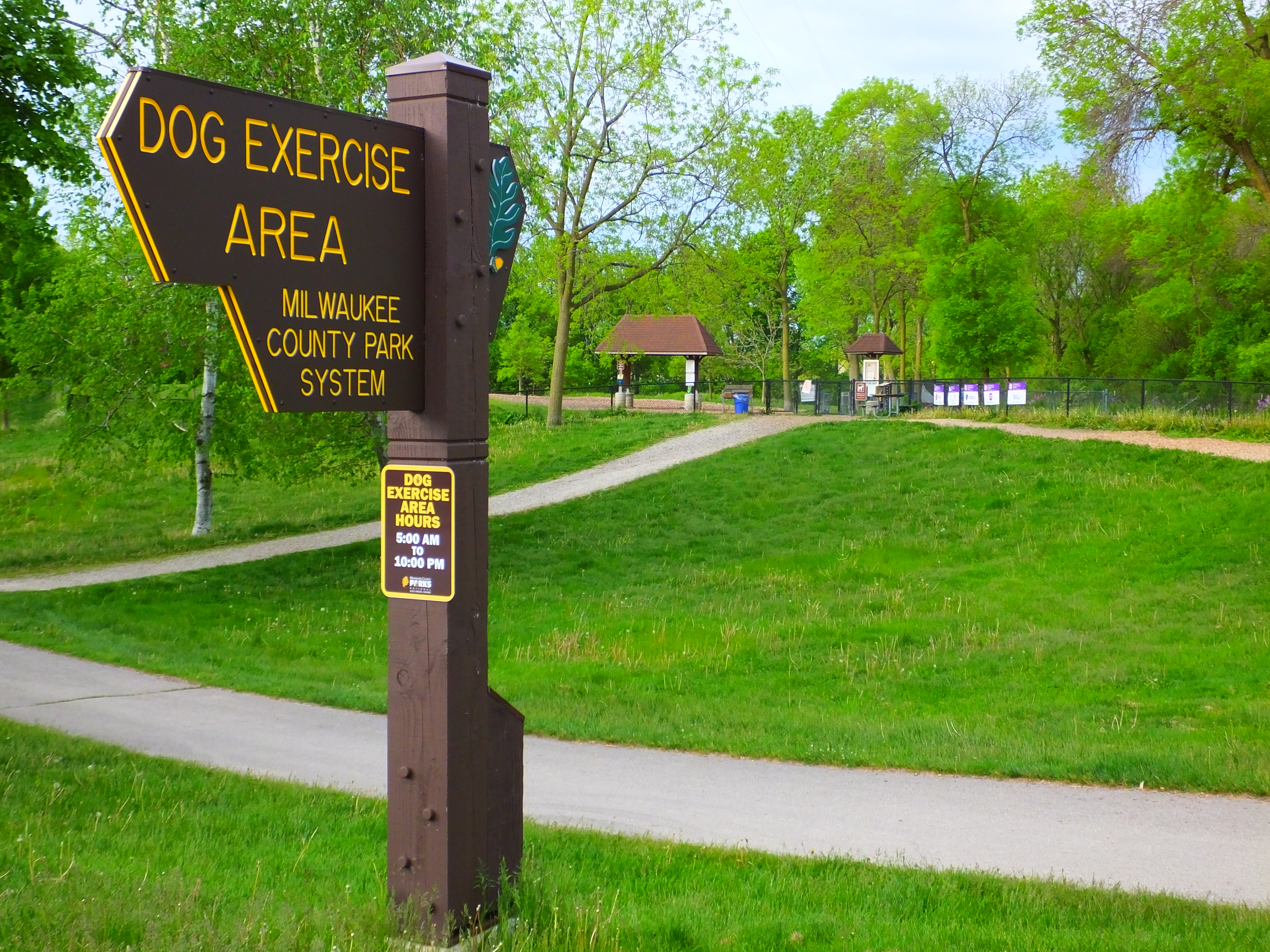
Dog park and signage

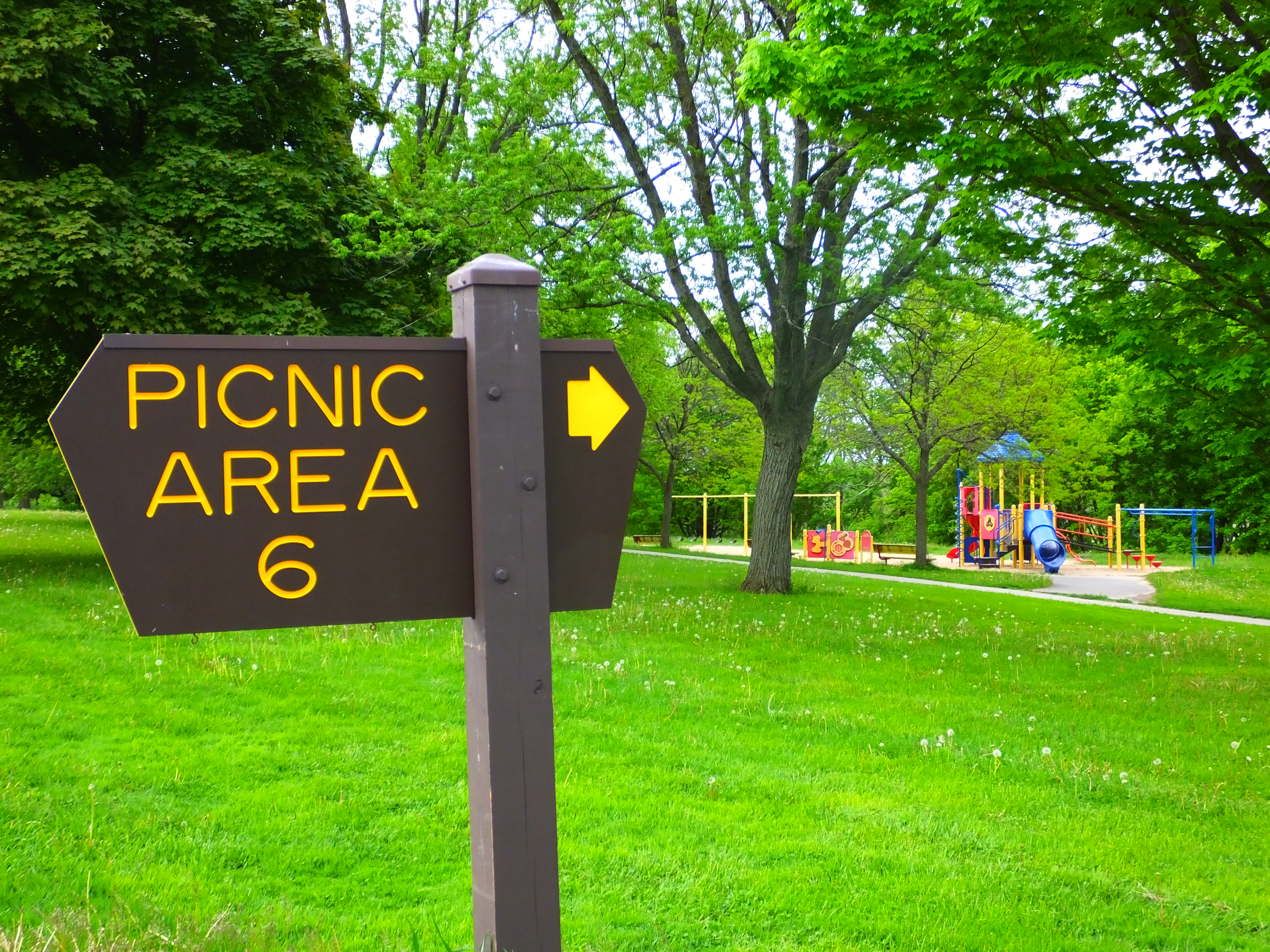
Picnic area signage and southern playground

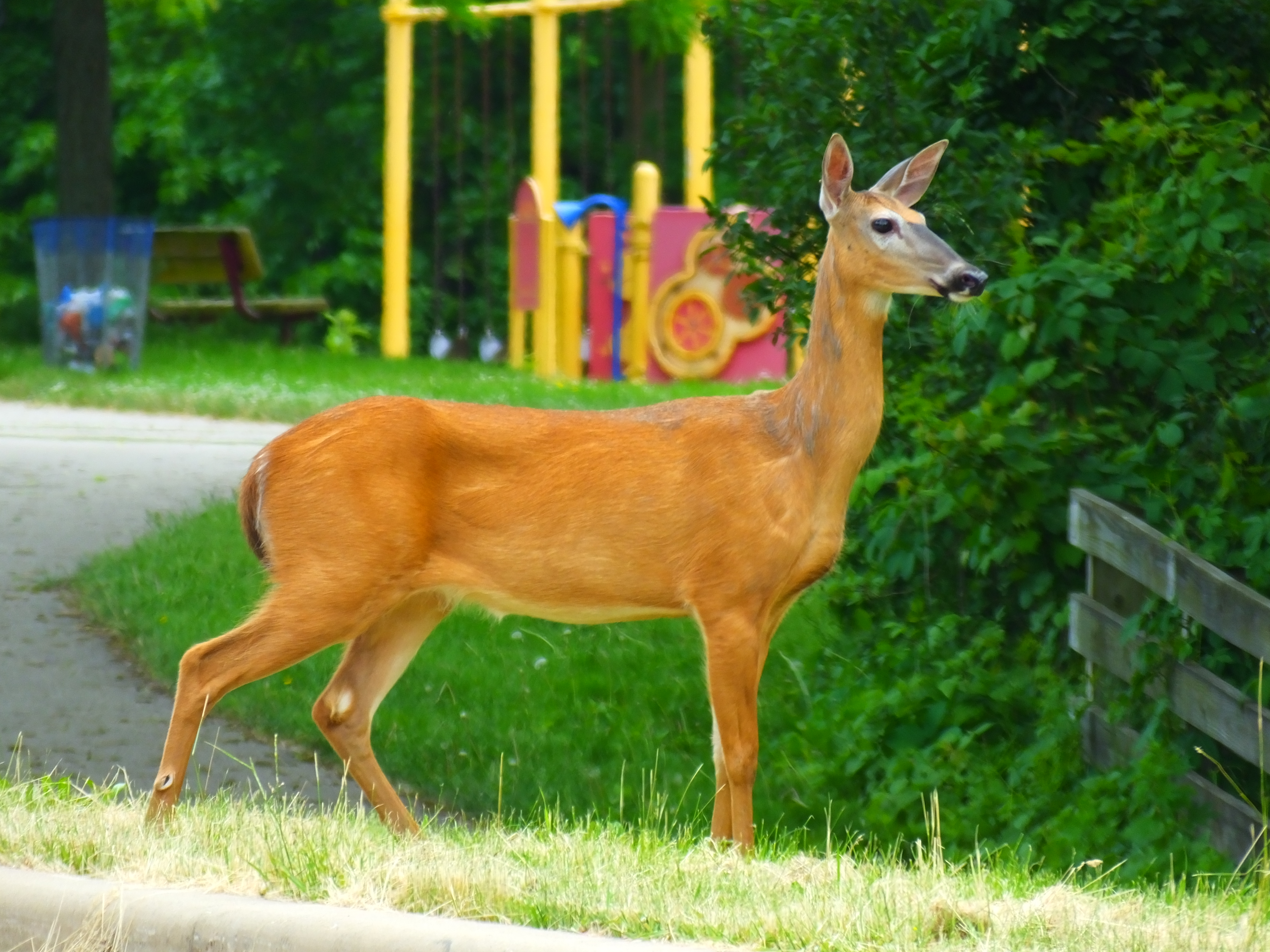
Southern playground with whitetail deer in the foreground

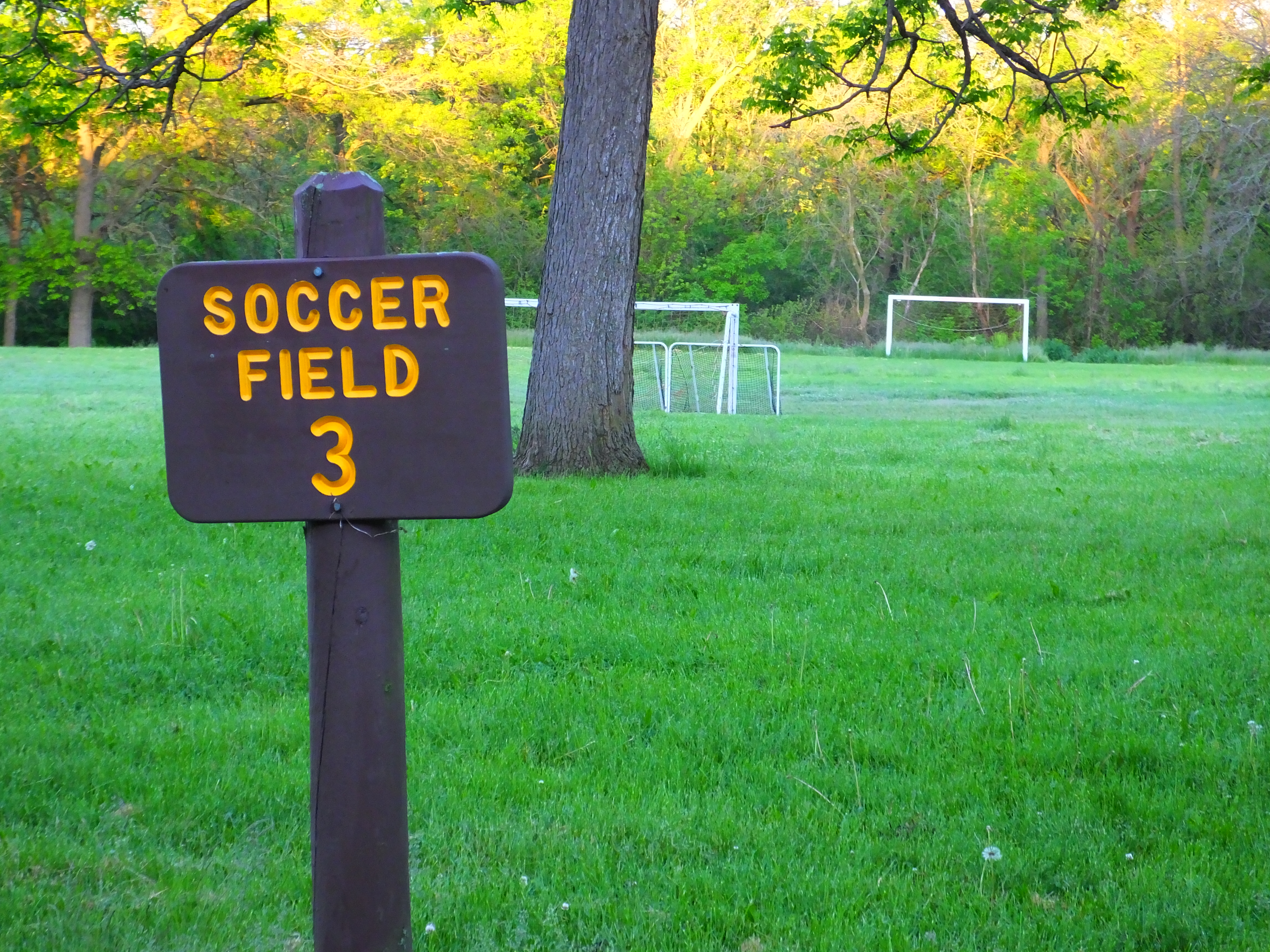
Soccer field signage

== History ==
The riverside site was home to the Milwaukee Cement Company from 1875 to 1911. The park was established in 1916, and the first parkway in the Milwaukee River Parkway system was added in 1927. Significant development took place in the early and mid-1930s, led in part by the Civilian Conservation Corps. In 1937 Milwaukee County constructed a dam at the park to raise water levels for recreational purposes. A year later the Benjamin Church house was restored and moved to the park in 1938. The WITI TV Tower was erected within the park in 1962. In 2018 the dam was removed.

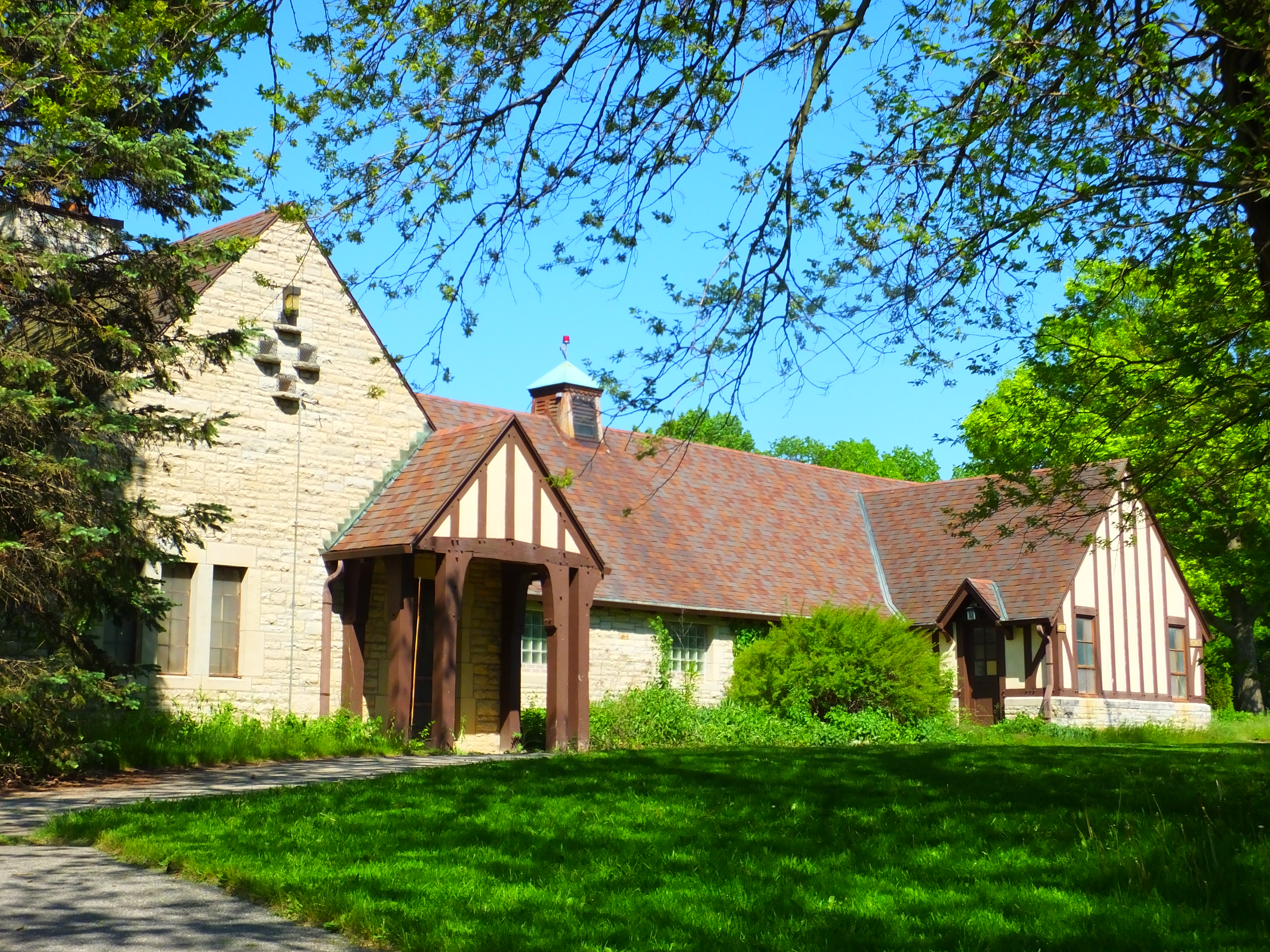
Estabrook Park Maintenance Headquarters

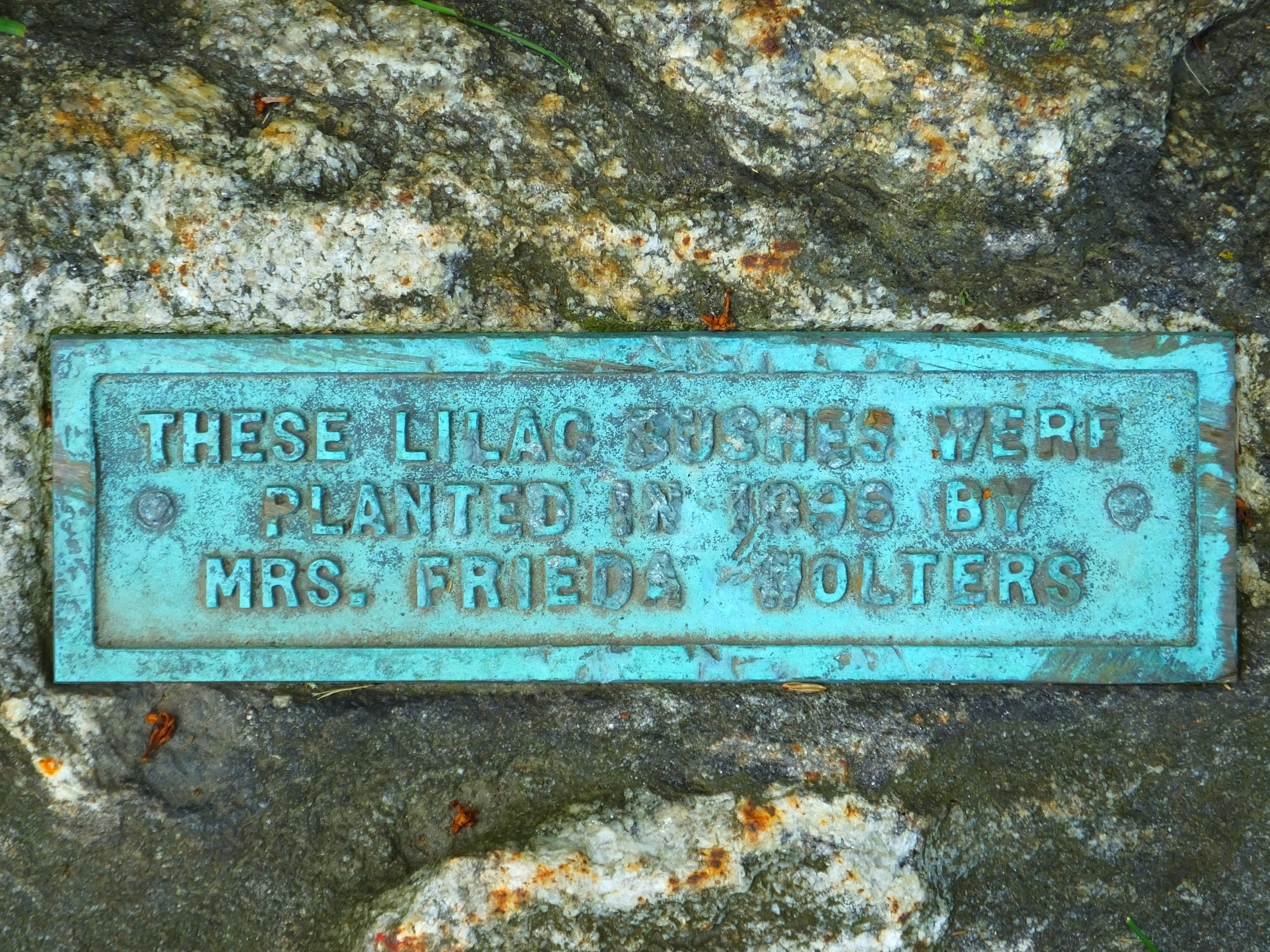
Historical marker

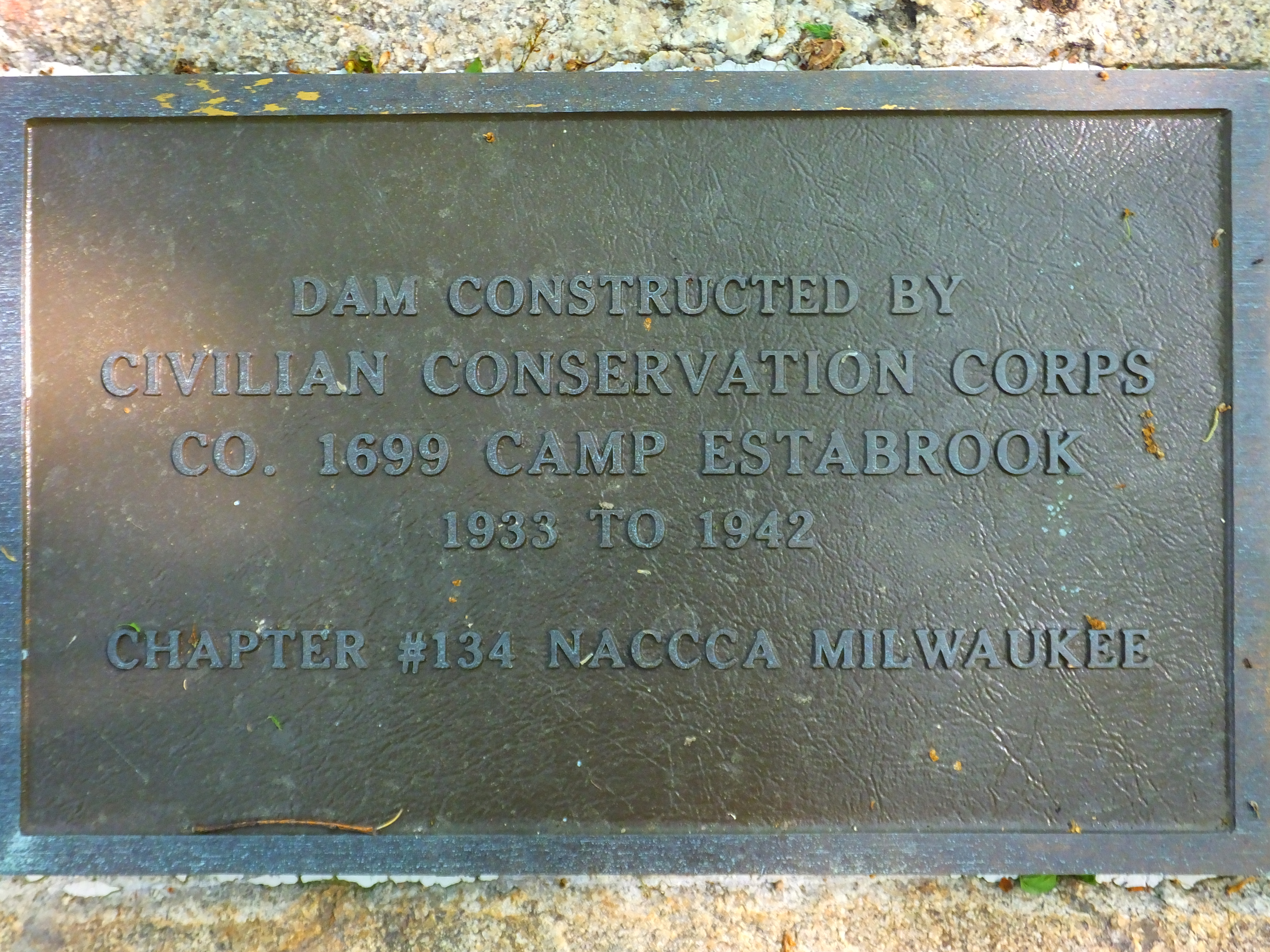
Estabrook Park Historical Plaque

== Pond ==
There is a small pond, sometimes called Estabrook Park Lagoon, covering about 1 acre (0.40 ha) to a maximum depth of 6 ft (1.8 m) and with a small island near the north end. It is reported to contain panfish, trout, goldfish, Chinese mystery snail, and Eurasian watermilfoil. There have also been sightings, depending on the season, of painted turtles, red-eared sliders, common snapping turtles, muskrats, American bullfrogs, American toads, Canada geese, mallards, wood ducks, blue-winged teals, great blue herons, green herons, red-breasted mergansers, hooded mergansers, pied-billed grebes, ring-billed gulls, and belted kingfishers in and on the water. Canada geese, mallards, and wood ducks have been observed to lay eggs, incubate them, and hatch broods of goslings and ducklings.

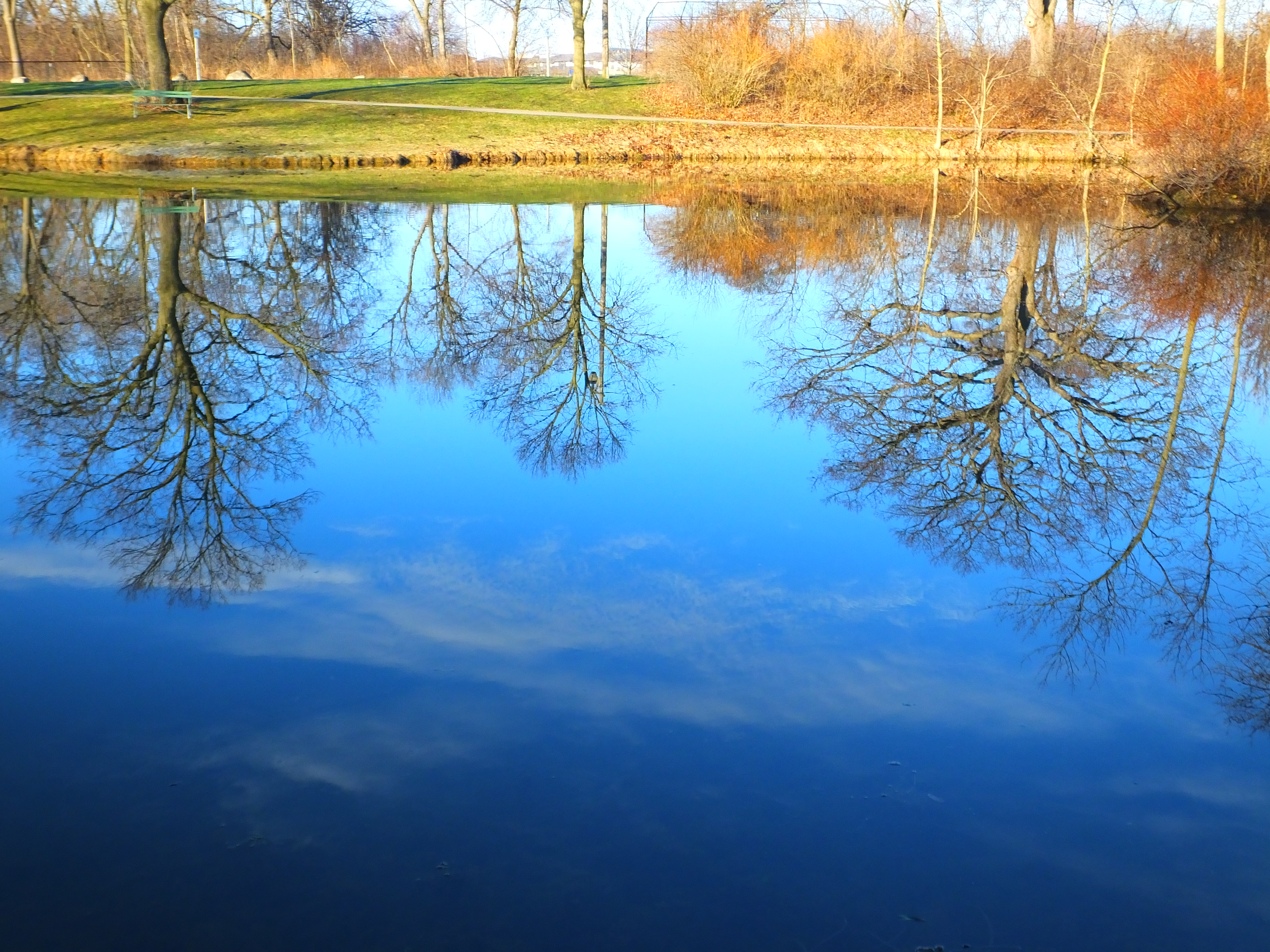
Estabrook Park Pond, facing west

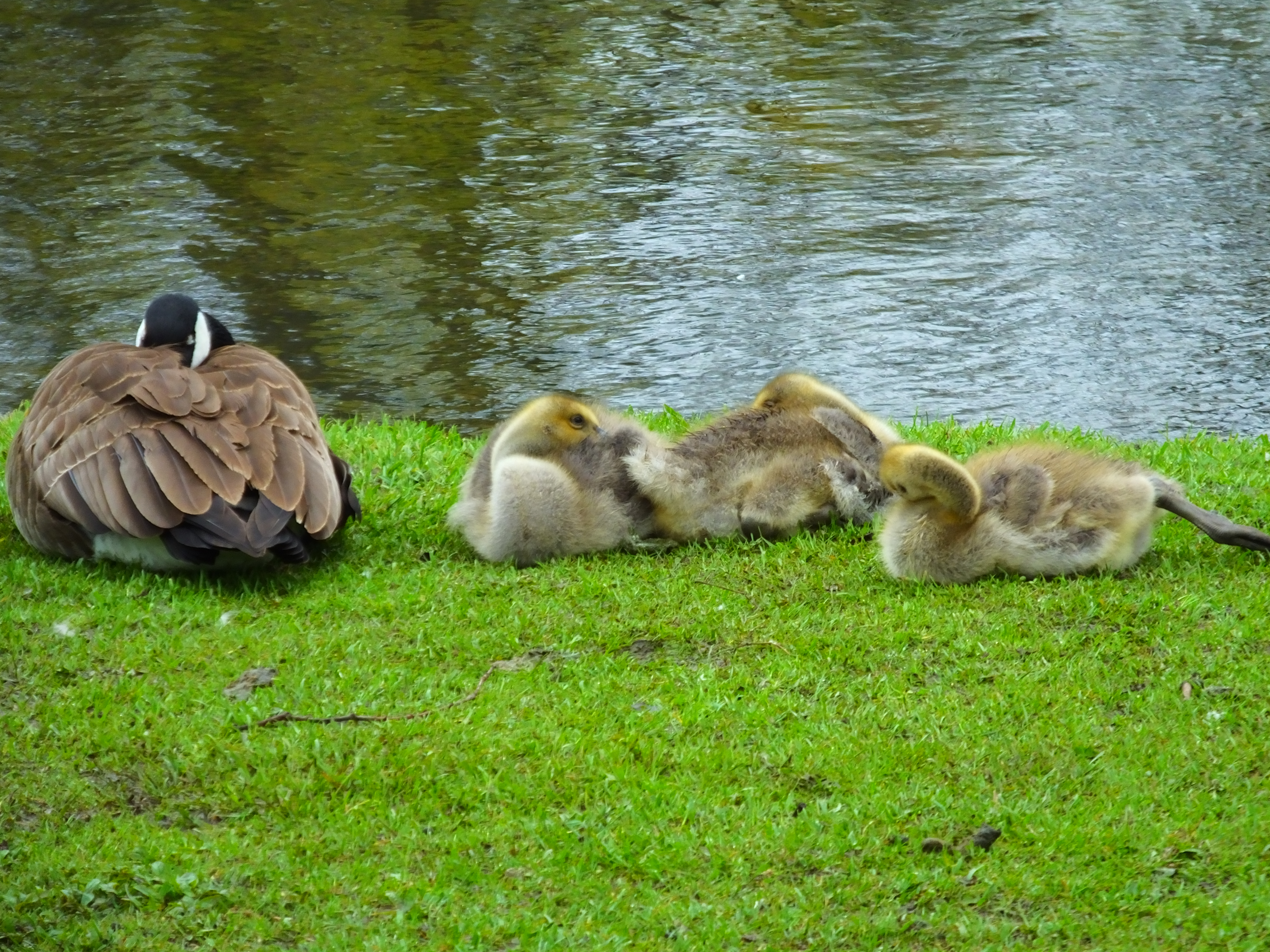
Canada goose and goslings on shore of Estabrook Park Pond

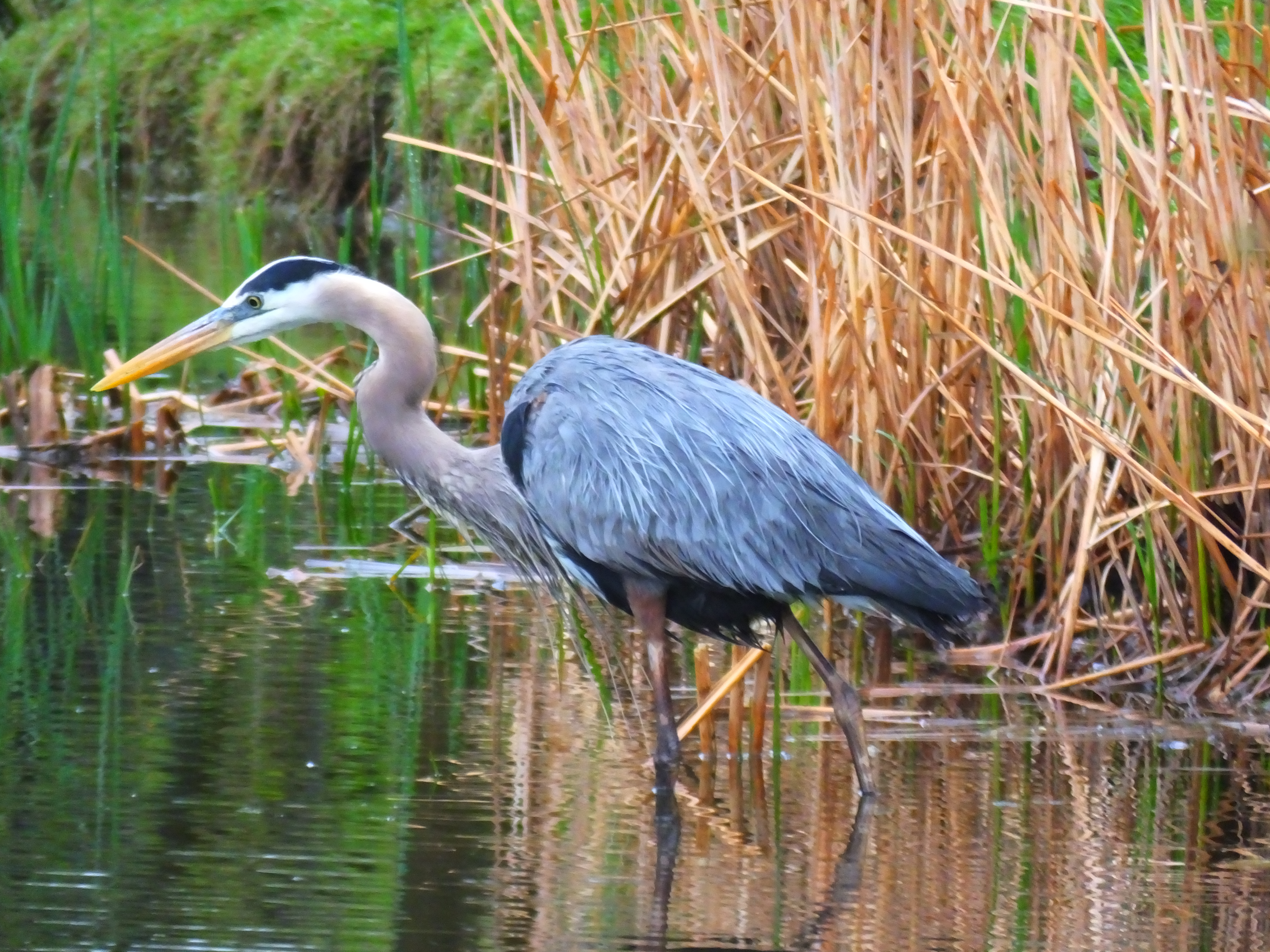
Great Blue Heron on Estabrook Park Pond

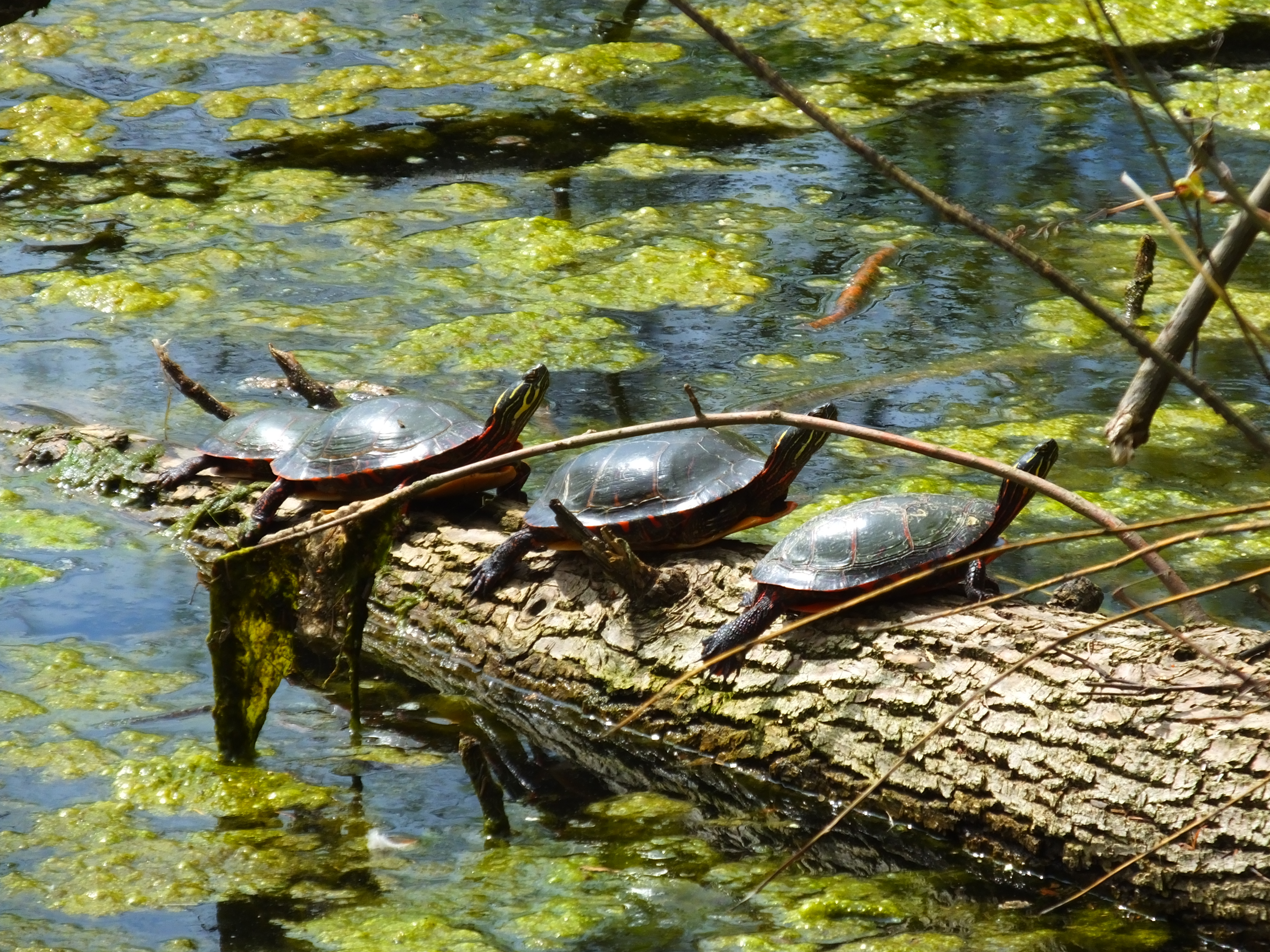
Painted turtles and red-eared sliders sunning themselves on a log in Estabrook Park

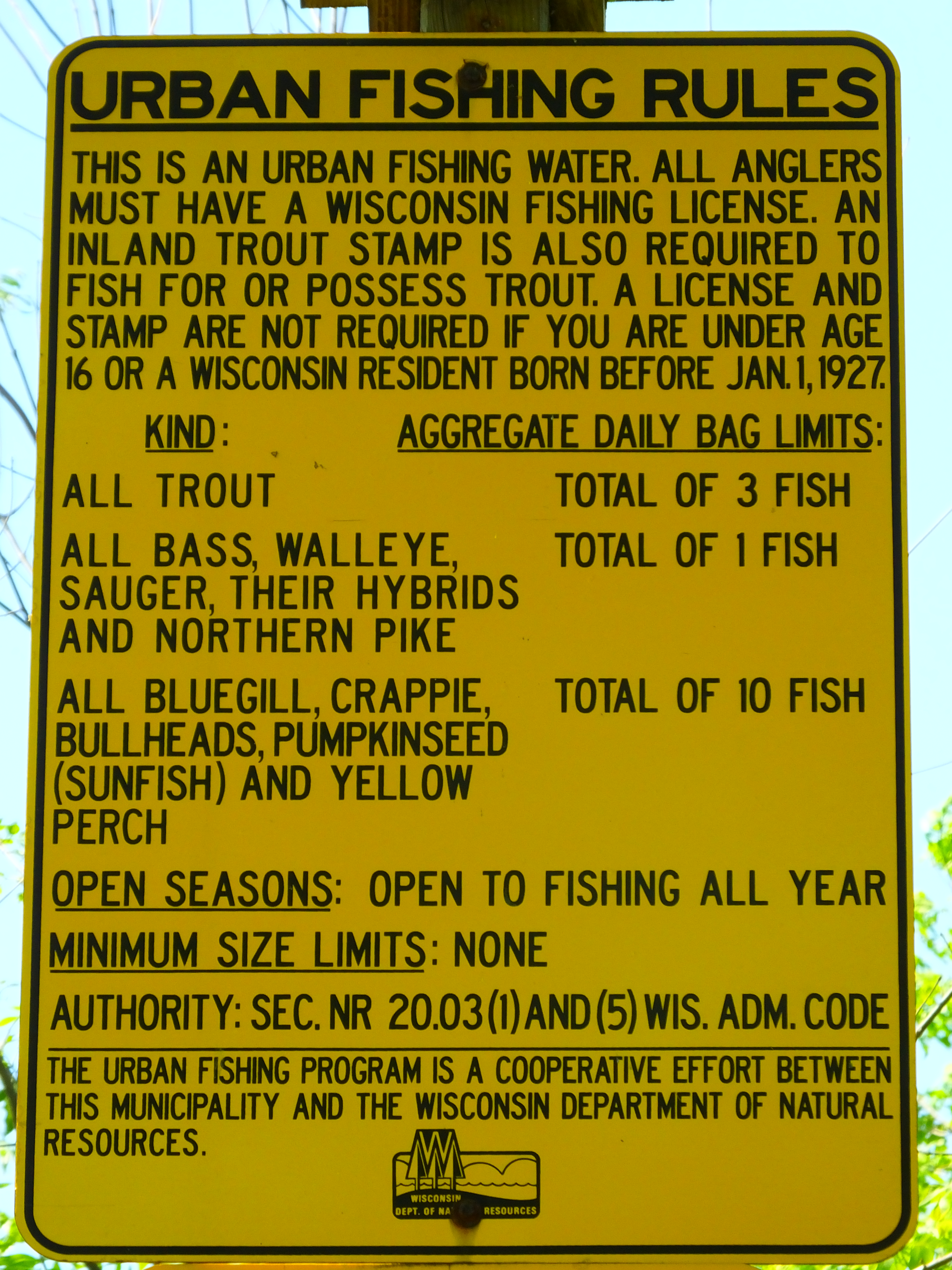
Estabrook Park Fishing Plaquard

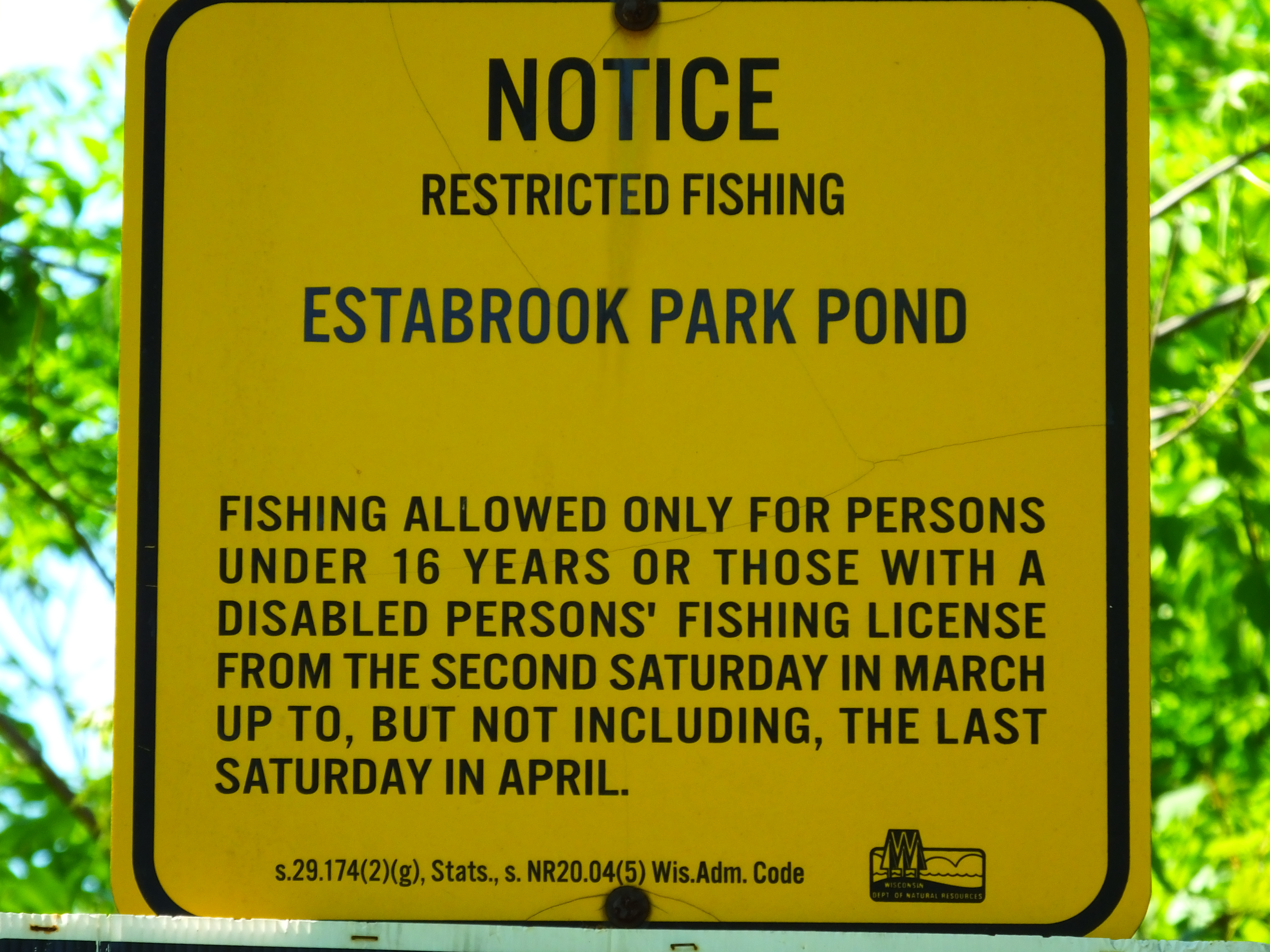
Estabrook Park Fishing Notice Plaquard

== Beer garden ==
"Estabrook Beer Garden brought back the tradition of public beer gardens to Milwaukee." "Estabrook Beer Garden is part of the Milwaukee County Park System, developed and operated under contract by ABC Estabrook INC d/b/a Estabrook Beer Garden."

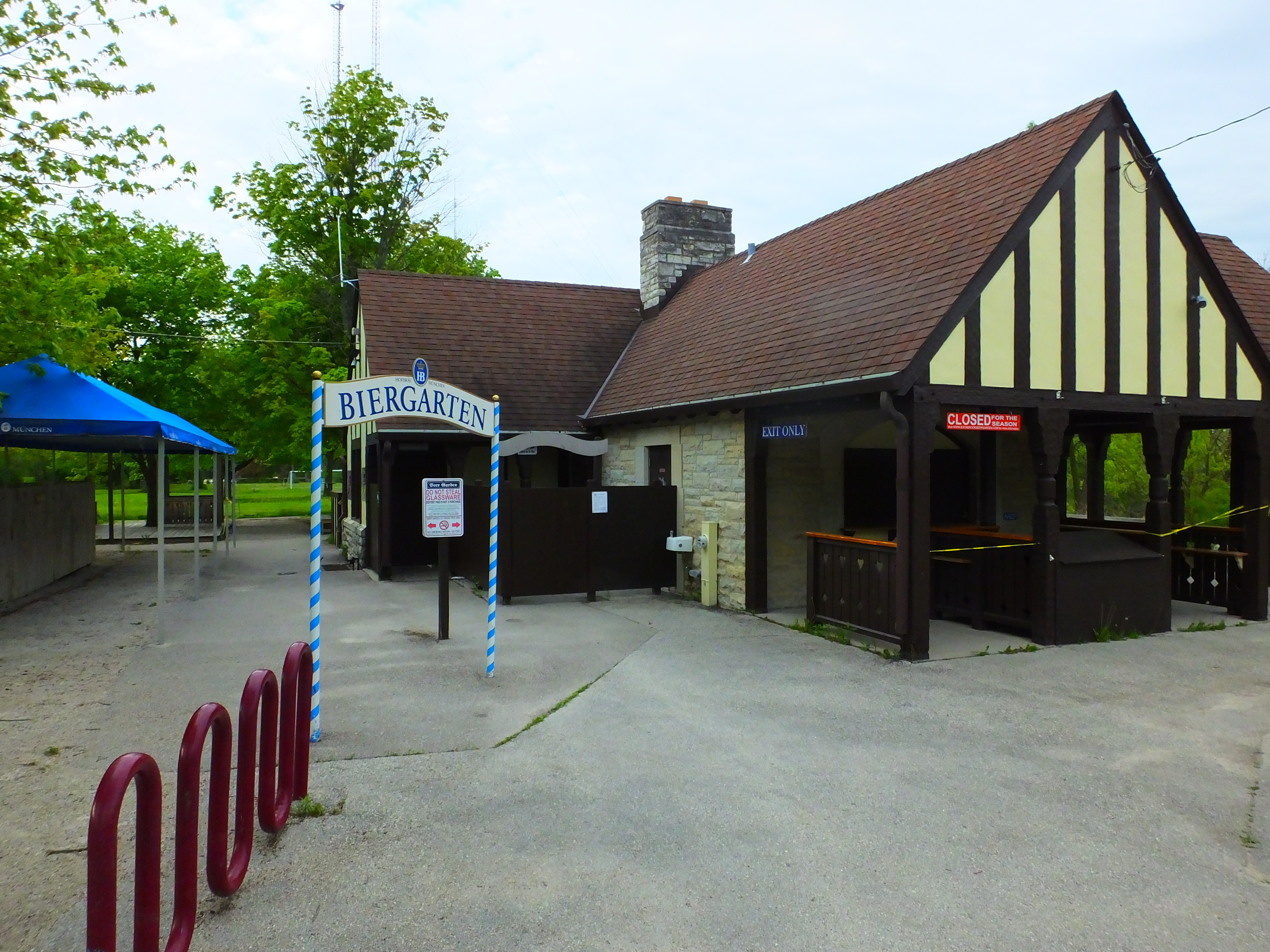
Beer garden

== Disc golf ==
There is a 20-hole disc golf course covering much of the northern end of the park.

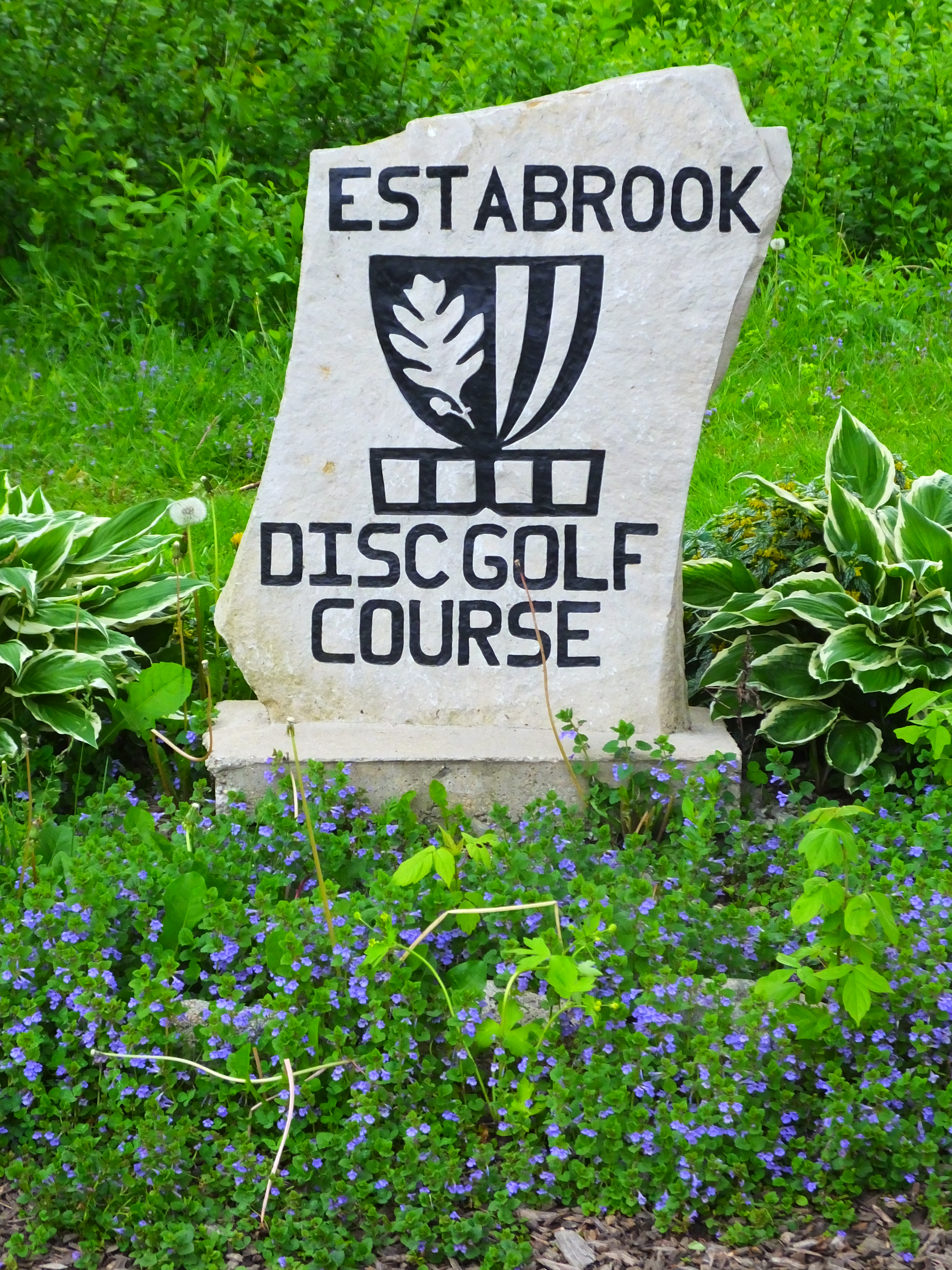
Estabrook Park disk golf marker

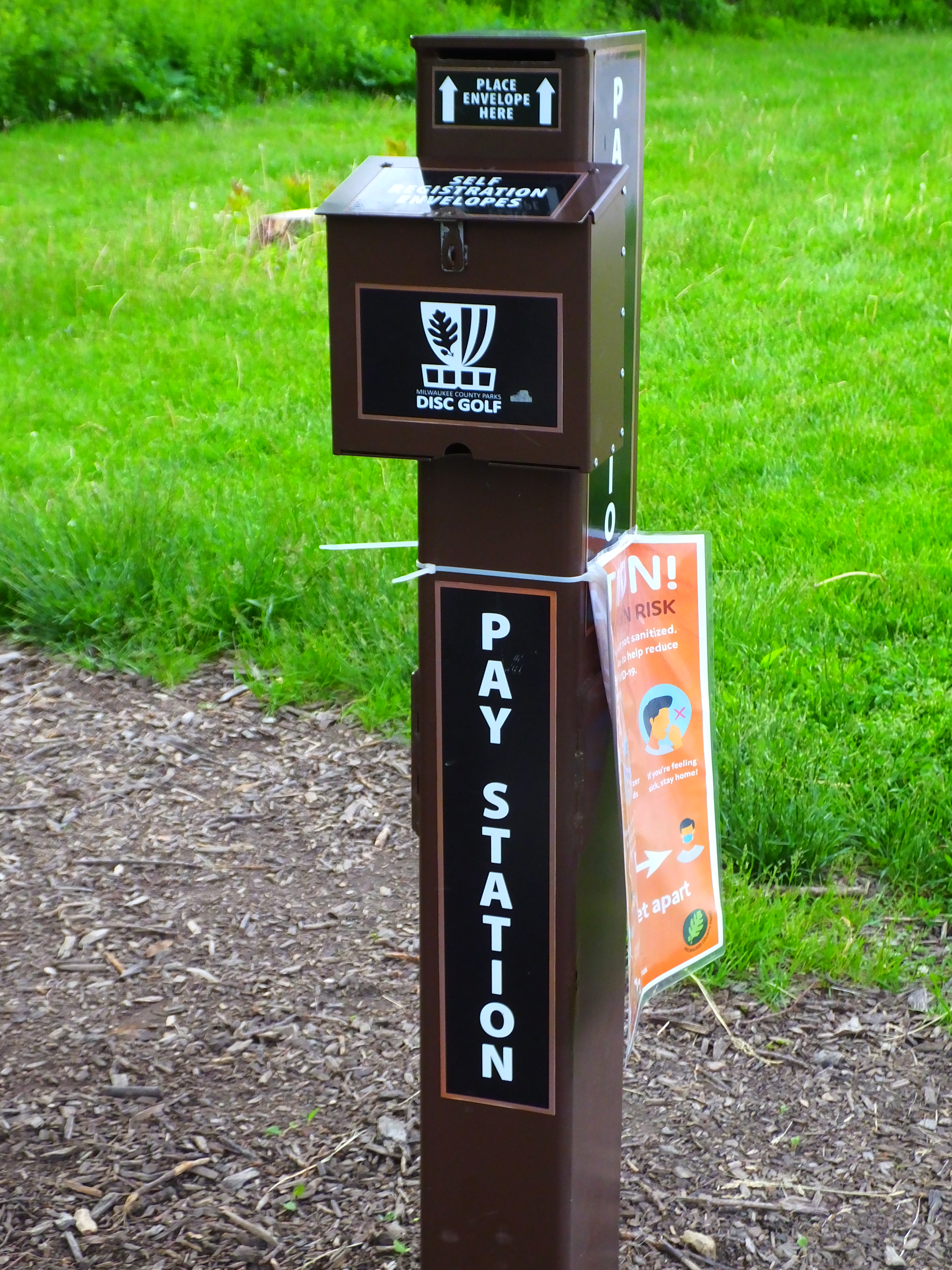
Estabrook Park disc golf course pay station

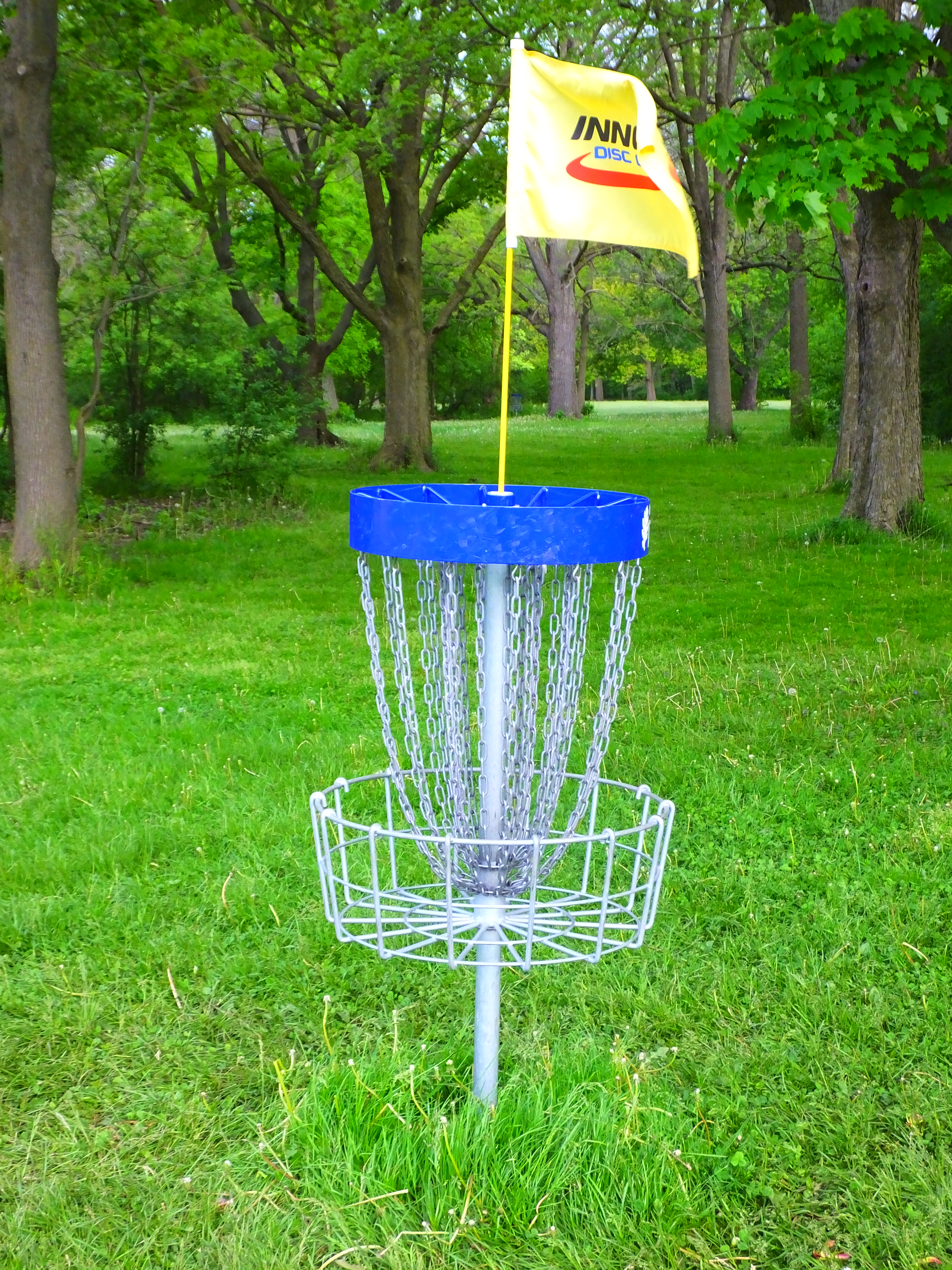
Estabrook Park disc golf course target

== Antennas ==
There are four broadcasting antenna in and near the park: one, free-standing tower antenna located entirely in the park at the south east corner, and three triangular lattice guyed mast antenna located just across the Milwaukee River from the park, each with a guy-wire anchor located in the park. From north to south, they are:

- WVTV
- WMVS
- WTMJ-TV
- WITI TV Tower
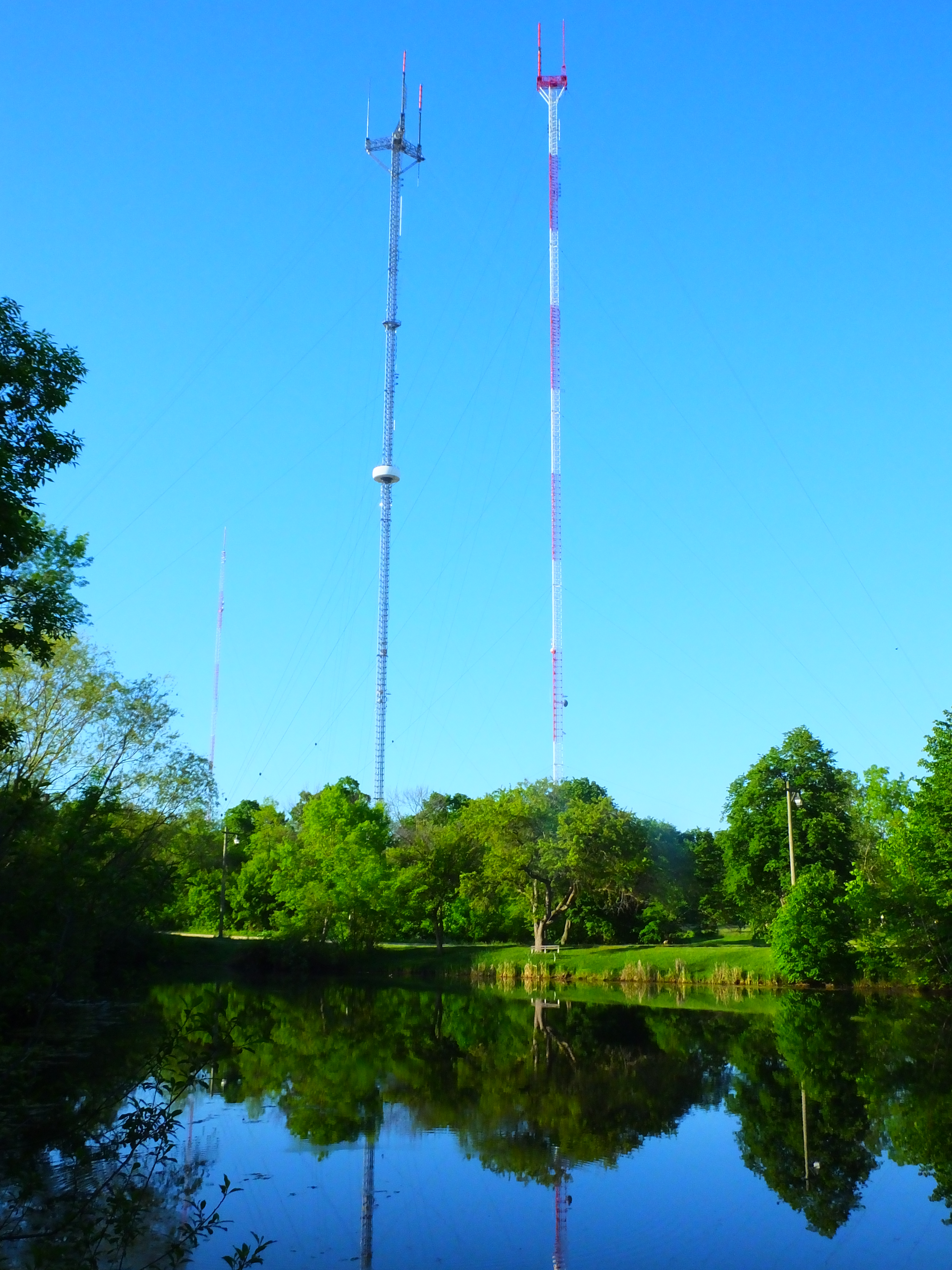
Estabrook Park pond with antenna towers across the river in the background

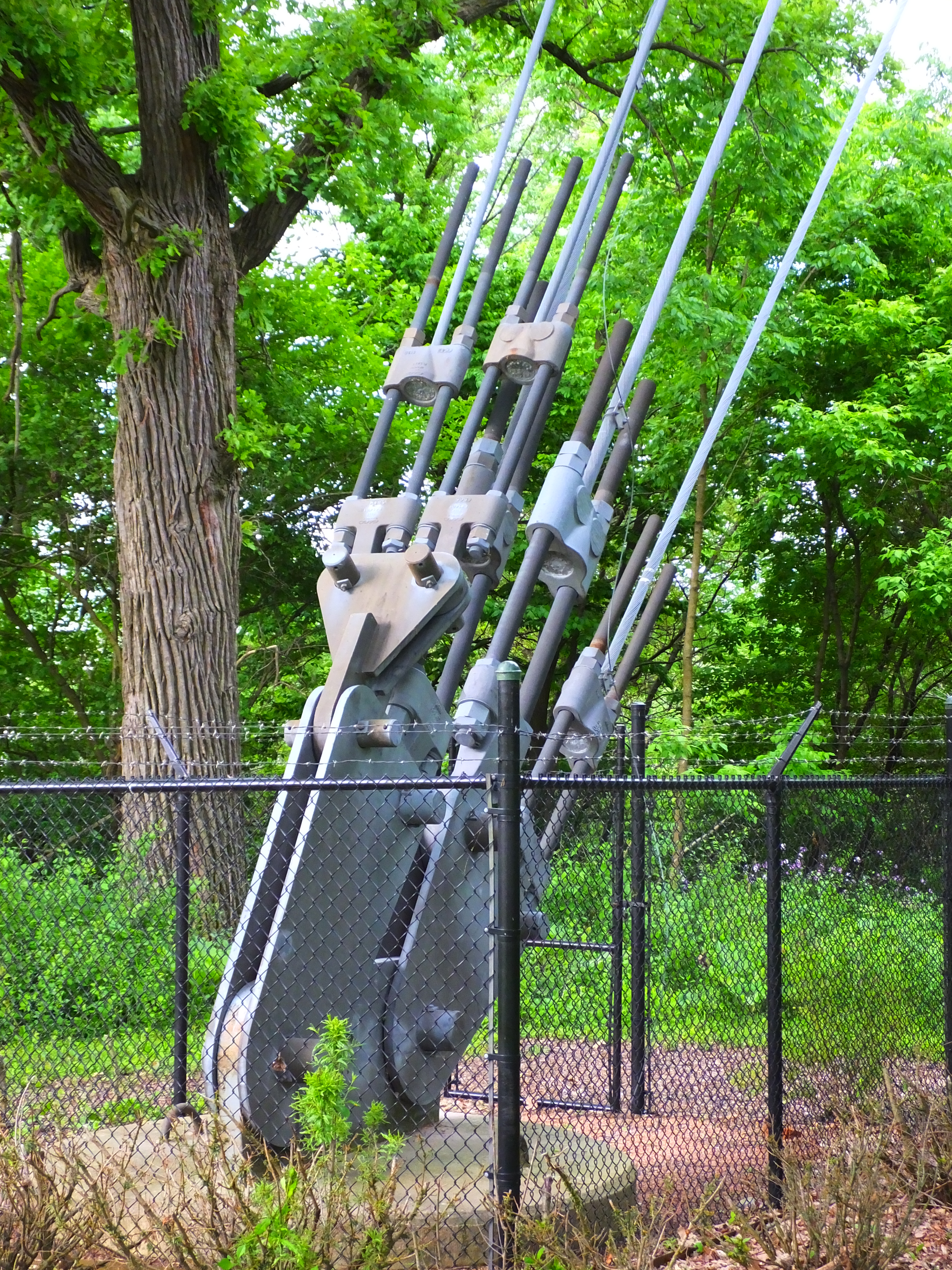
Antenna mast guy-wire anchor 1

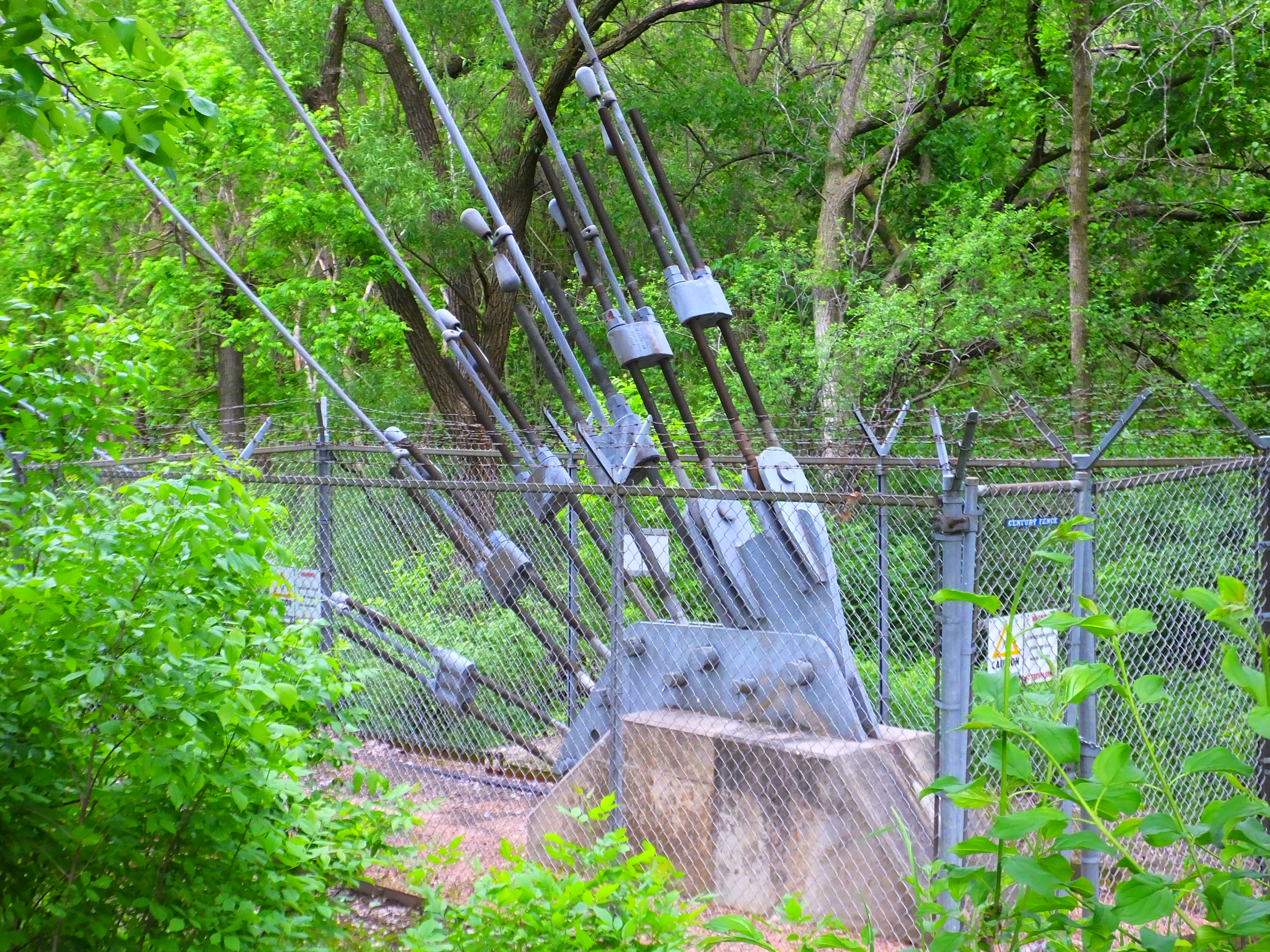
Antenna mast guy-wire anchor 2

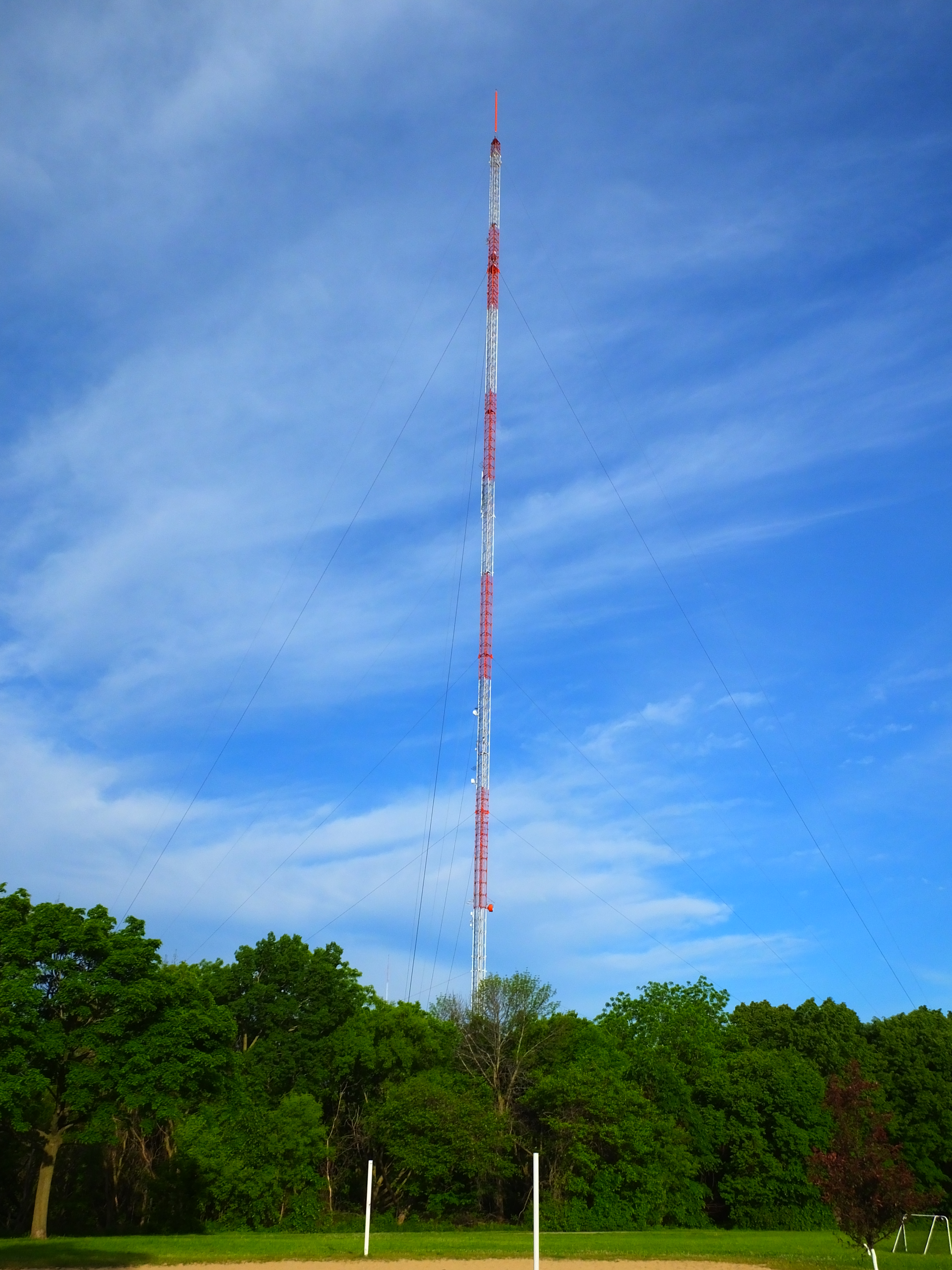
Soccer field with antenna tower across the river in the background

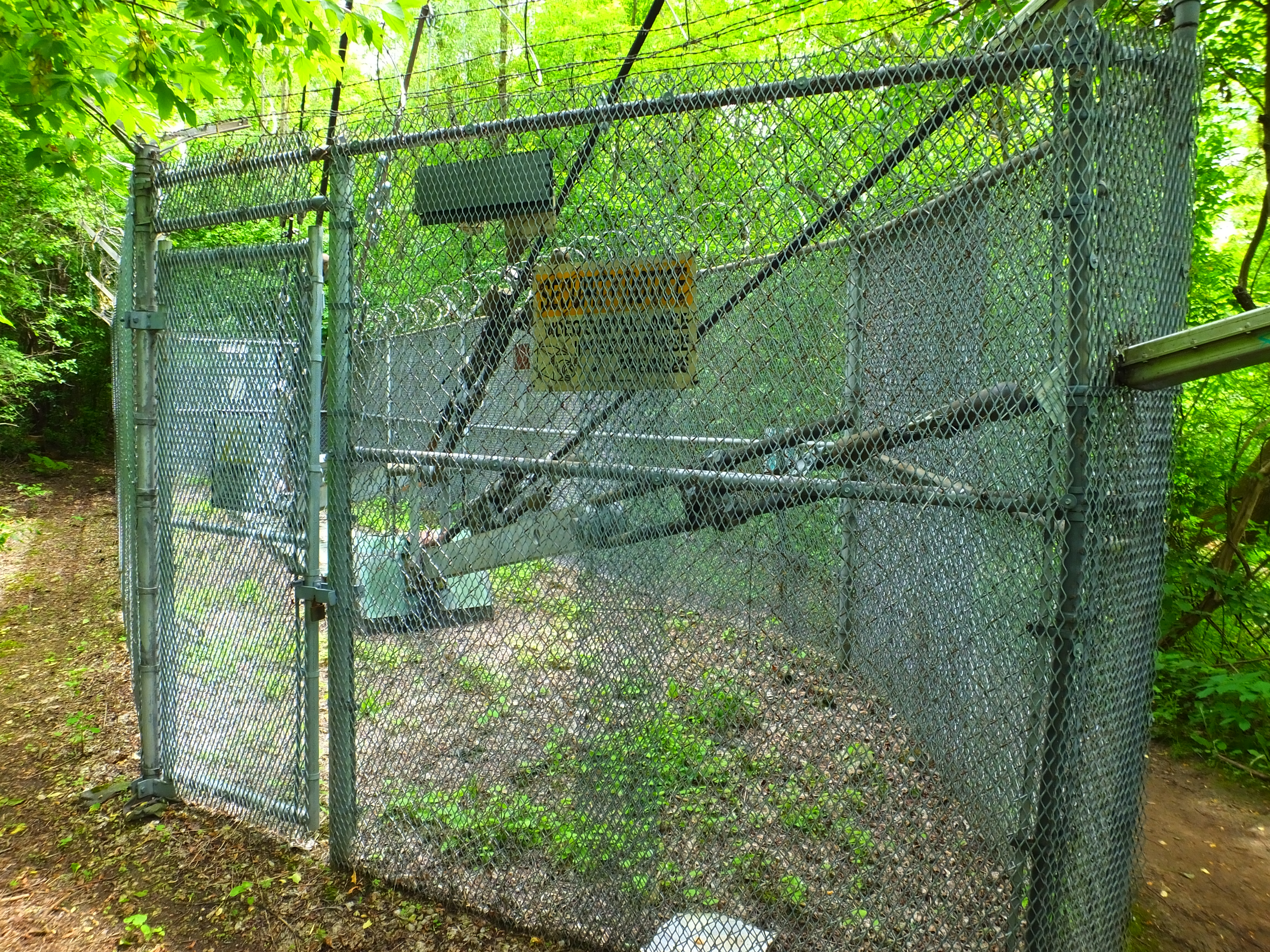
Antenna mast guy-wire anchor 3

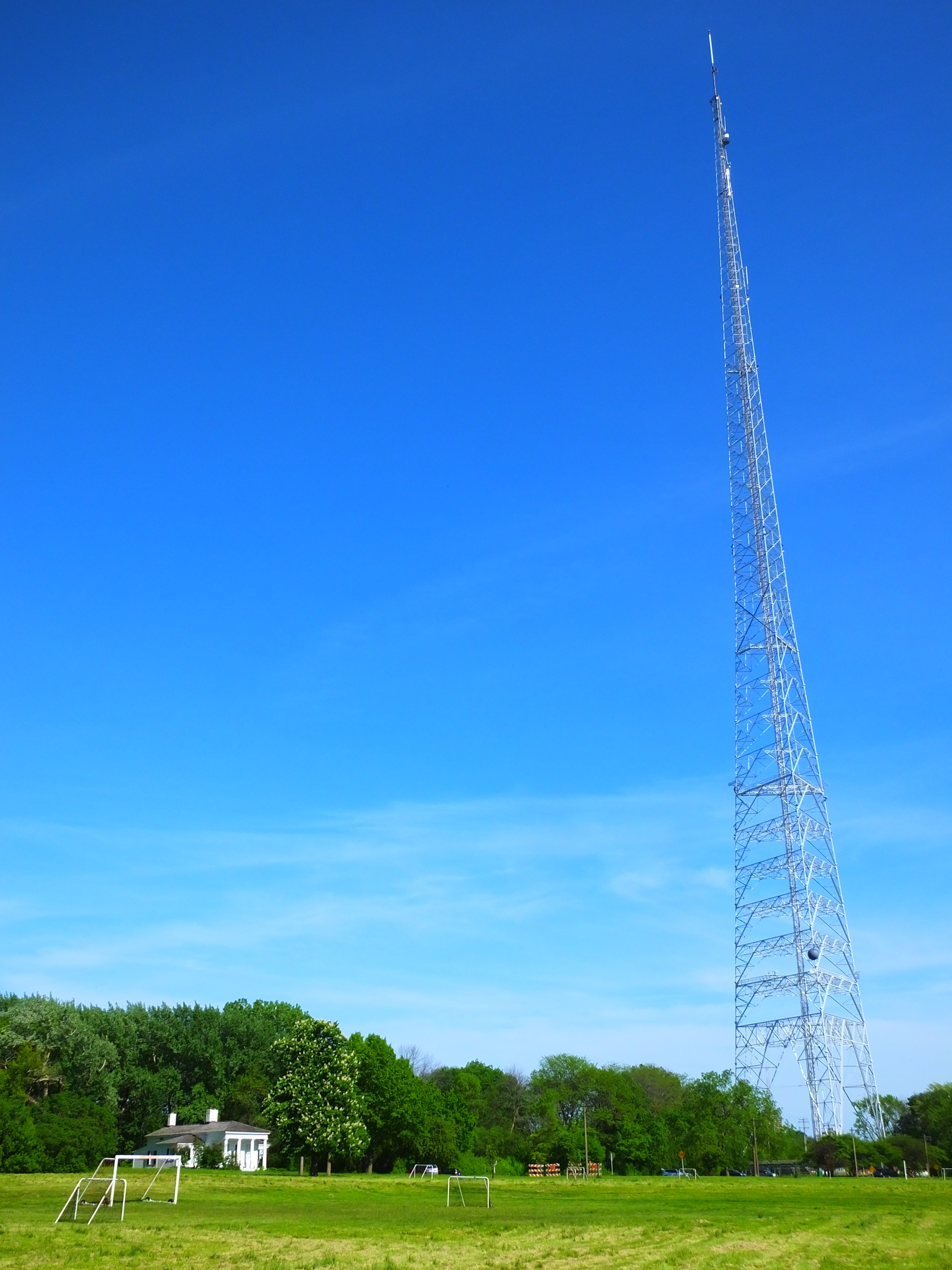
View across soccer field of WITI TV Tower and Benjamin Church House at south end of park

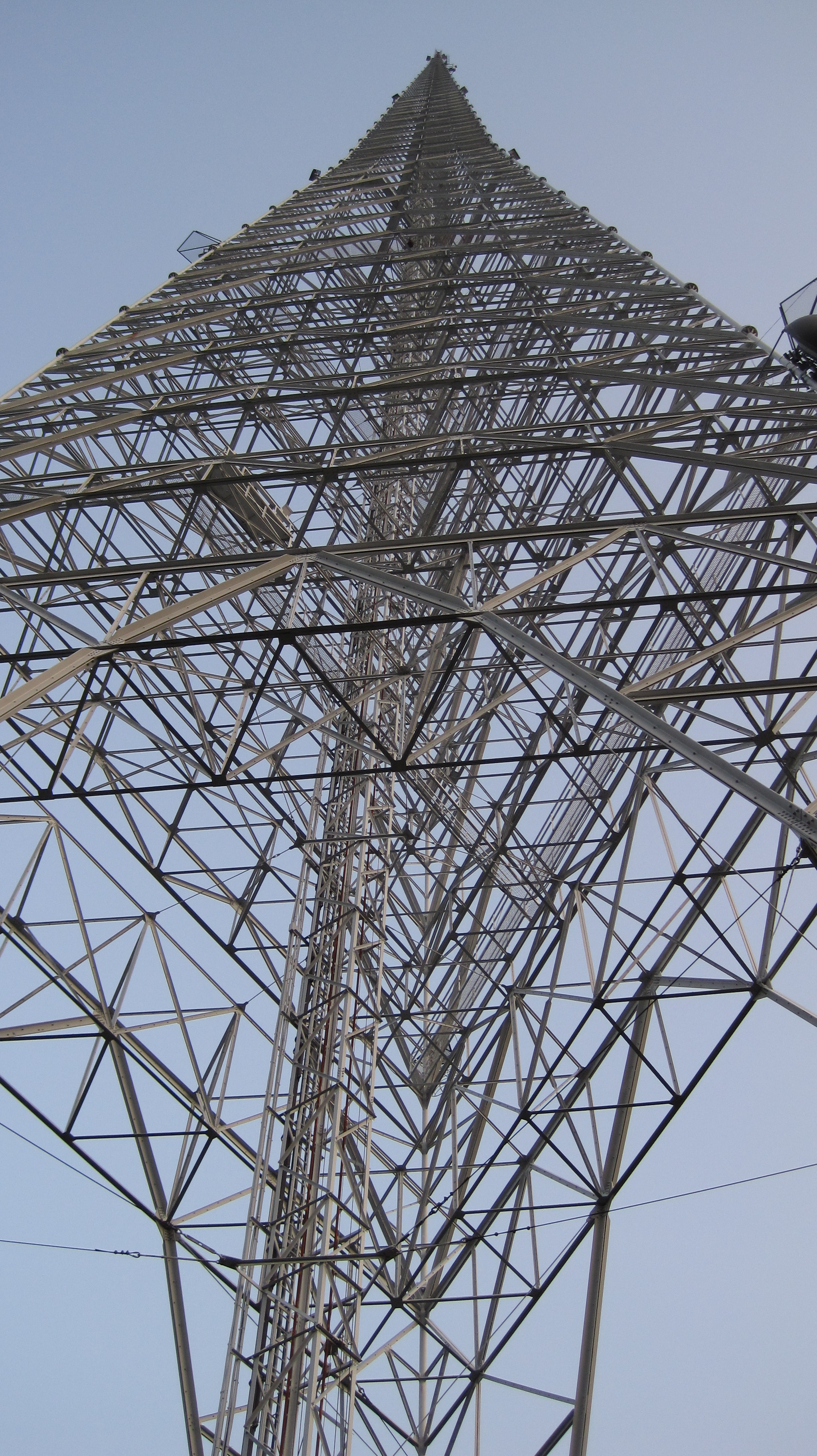
WITI TV Tower detail in southeast corner of park

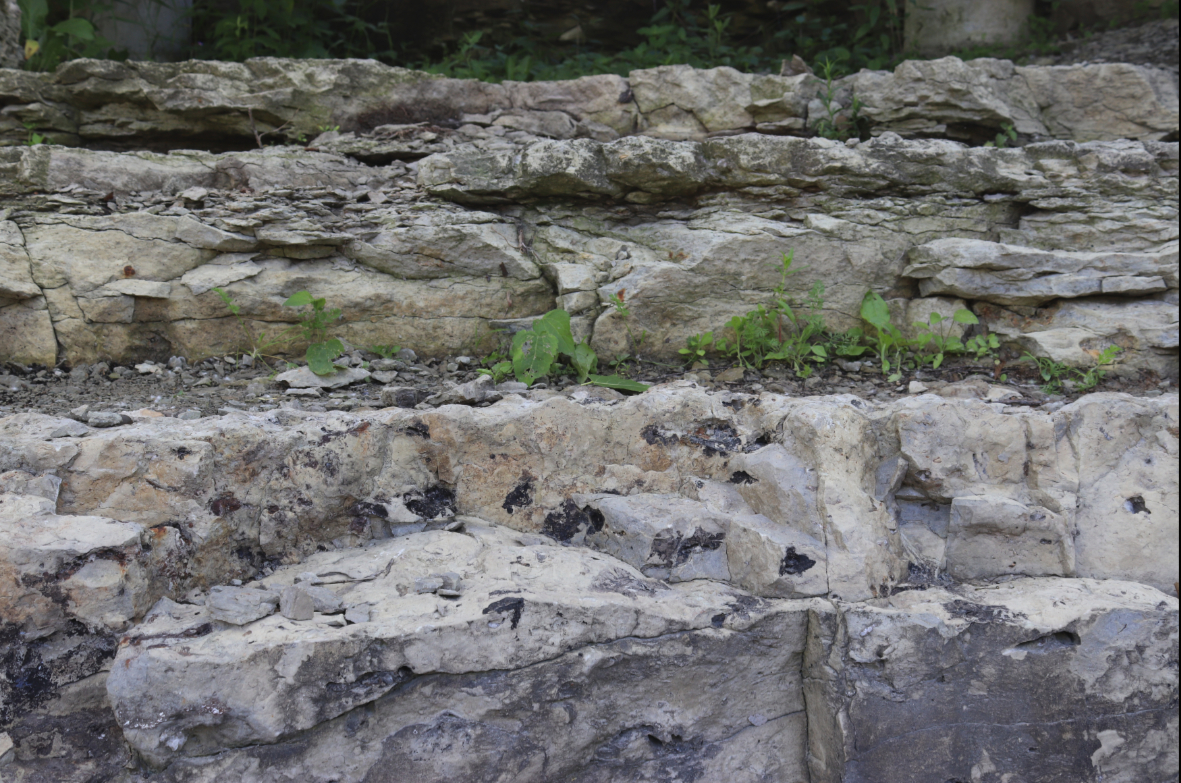
Milwaukee Formation exposed along the river

== Geology ==
The park comprises a mostly flat plateau at about 650 ft (200 m) above sea level, a bluff descending about 50 ft (15 m) to the Milwaukee river at about 600 ft (180 m) above sea level, and some flat areas along the river bank. The Milwaukee Formation is exposed on the descent to the river.

== Gallery ==
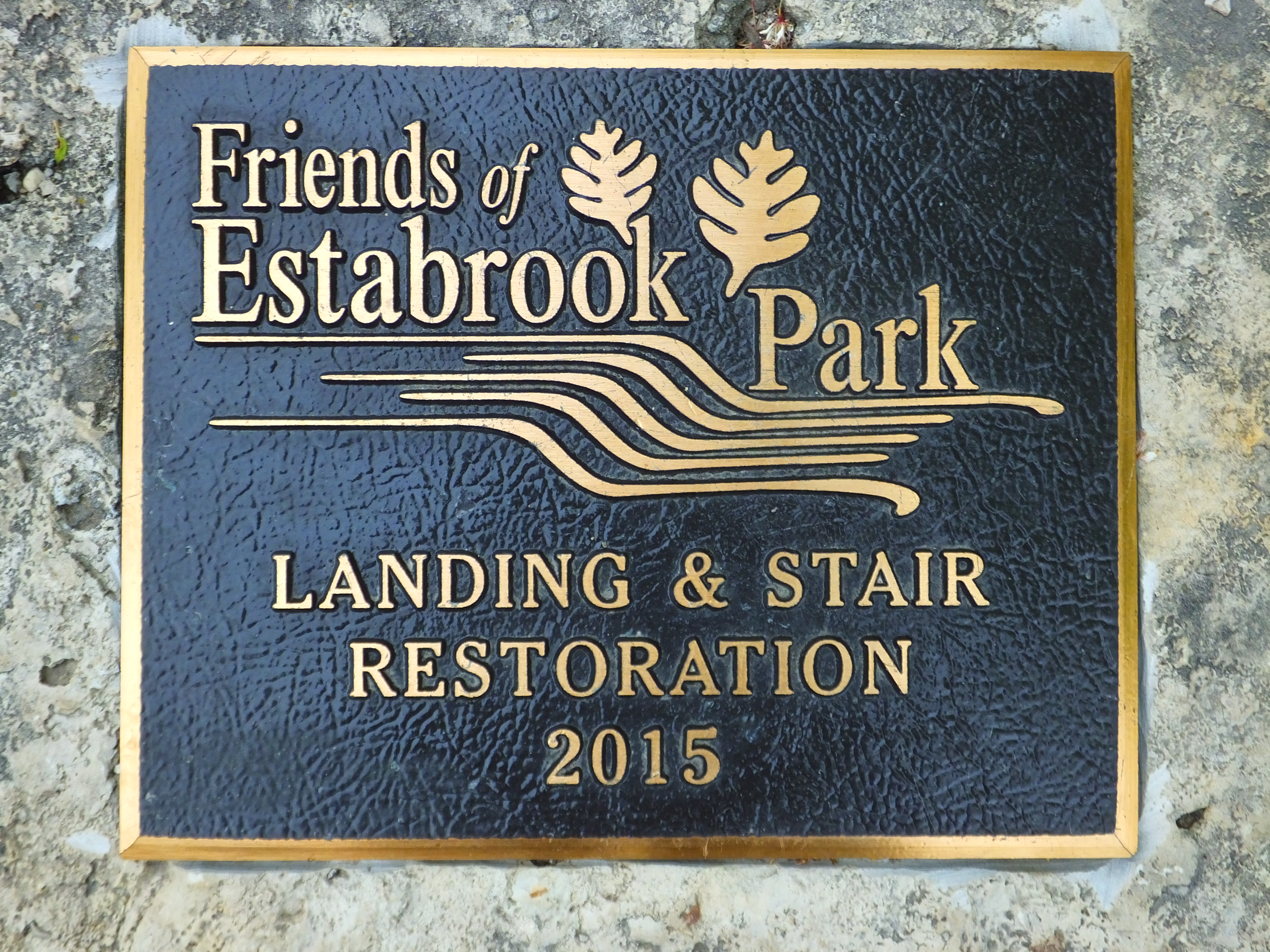
Estabrook Park Plaque

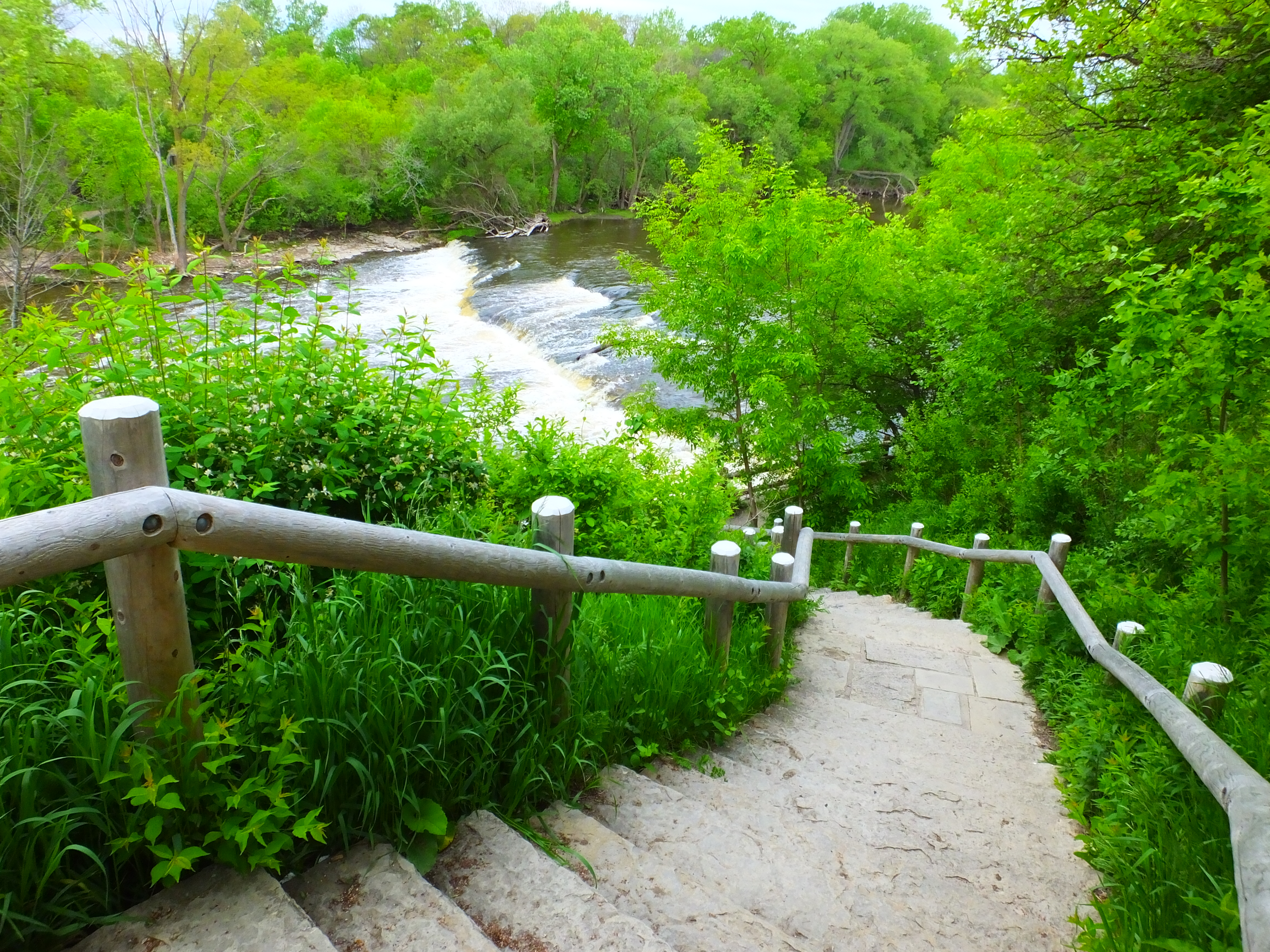
Estabrook Park stairway down bluff to Milwaukee River

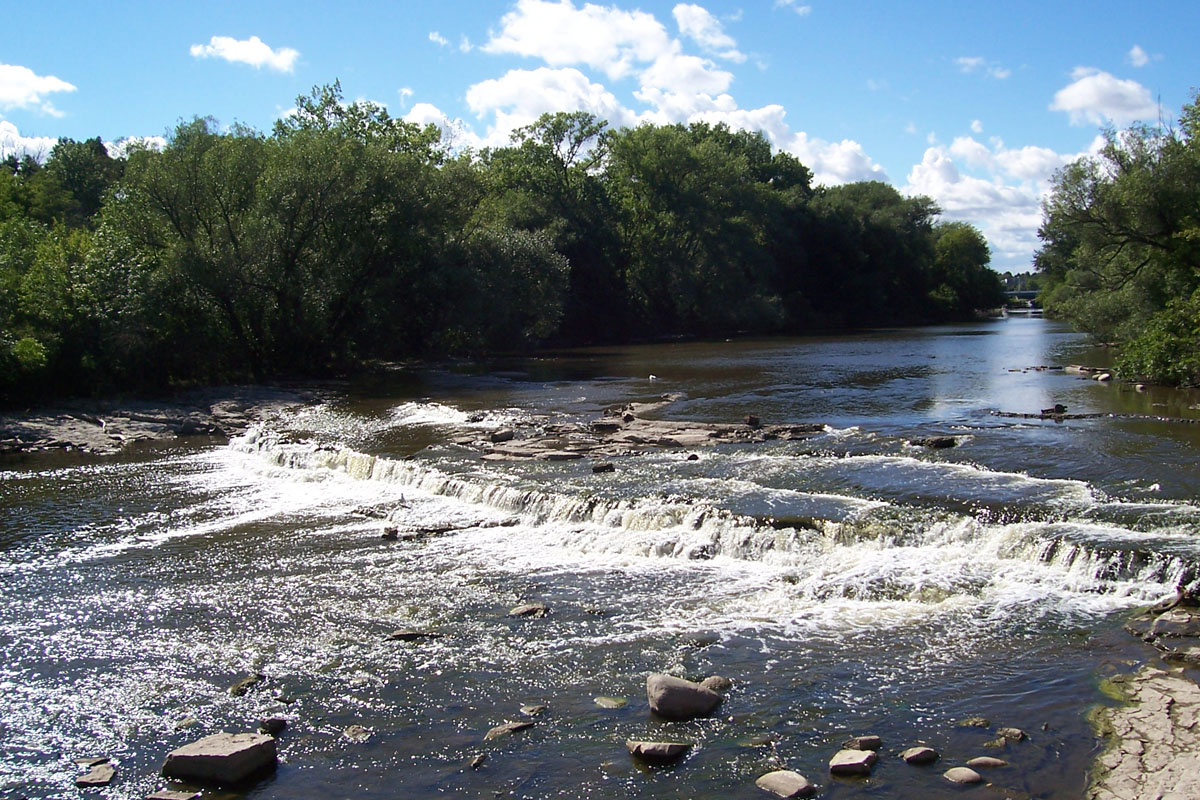
Milwaukee River along west edge of park

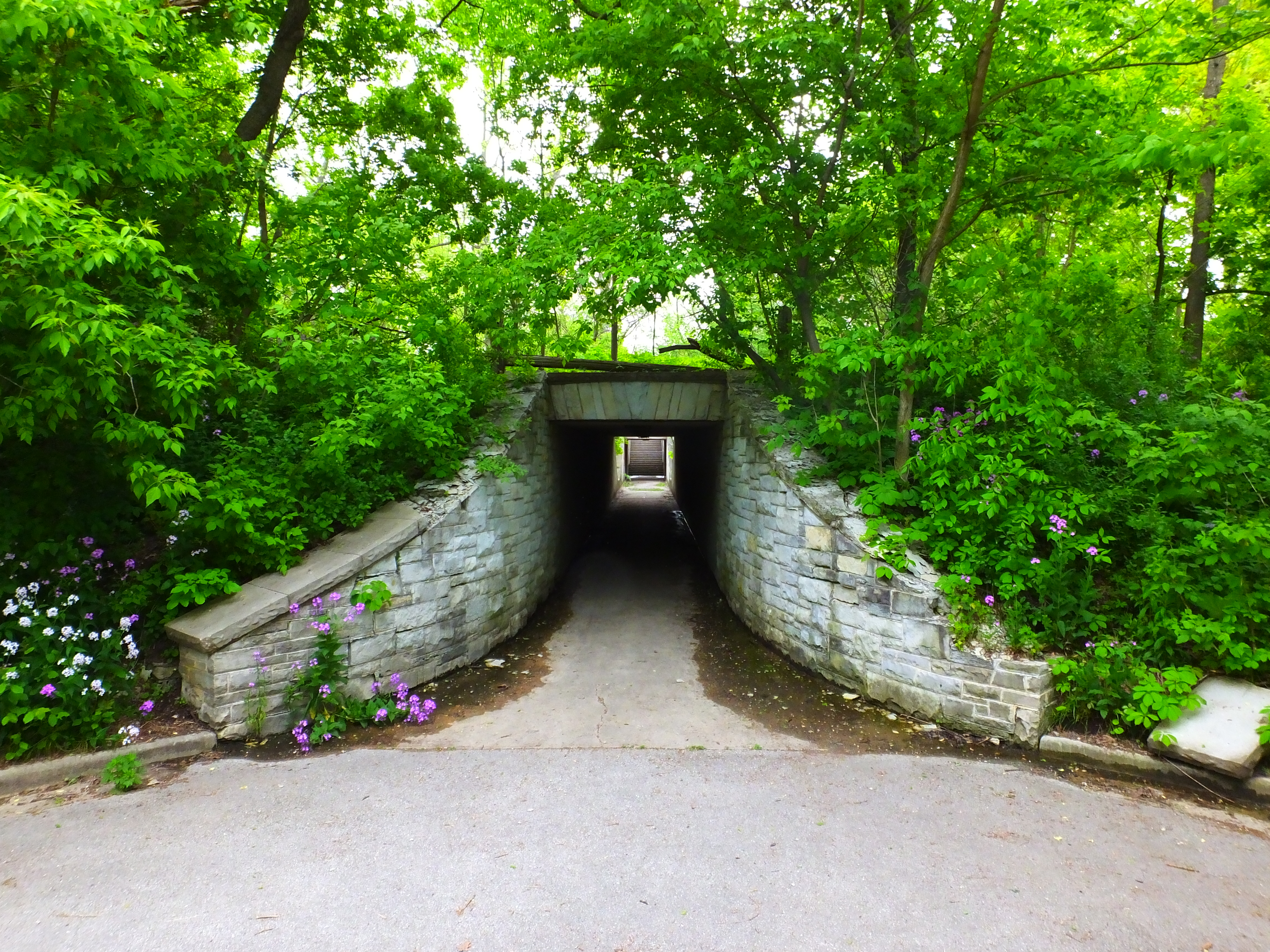
Estabrook Park underpass to Wilson Drive
