= National Register of Historic Places listings in Milwaukee County, Wisconsin =

Location of Milwaukee County in Wisconsin

This list comprises buildings, sites, structures, districts, and objects in Milwaukee County, which are listed on the National Register of Historic Places. There are 293 NRHP sites listed in Milwaukee County, including 219 in the City of Milwaukee included in the National Register of Historic Places listings in Milwaukee, Wisconsin and 74 outside of the city, listed below. Eight previously listed sites (outside of Milwaukee) have been removed.

This National Park Service list is complete through NPS recent listings posted November 13, 2026.

== Current listings ==
	Name on the Register	Image	Date listed	Location	City or town	Description
1	Albert and Edith Adelman House	Albert and Edith Adelman House	August 26, 2005 (#05000951)	7111 N. Barnett Ln. 43°08′45″N 87°53′57″W	Fox Point	Budget-conscious home designed by Frank Lloyd Wright in 1948. Adelman founded a large dry-cleaning business.
2	Annunciation Greek Orthodox Church	Annunciation Greek Orthodox Church	December 19, 1974 (#74000100)	9400 W. Congress St. 43°05′51″N 88°01′48″W	Wauwatosa	Greek Orthodox church in which Frank Lloyd Wright reinterpreted traditional Byzantine architectural forms. Designed in 1956, one of Wright's last.
3	APPOMATTOX (shipwreck)	APPOMATTOX (shipwreck)	January 20, 2005 (#04001547)	Off Atwater Beach; Boundary increase (listed September 15, 2011): 150 yards. off Atwater Beach; 43°05′37″N 87°51′58″W	Shorewood	330-foot wooden steam freighter, built in 1896 by James Davidson. One of the largest wooden ships ever built, she mostly carried iron ore east on the Great Lakes and returned with coal. Ran aground in a fog bank in November 1905.
4	Rufus Arndt House	Rufus Arndt House	September 12, 1985 (#85002016)	4524 N. Cramer St. 43°05′55″N 87°53′09″W	Whitefish Bay	Cotswold Cottage-styled house built in 1925 according to one of Ernest Flagg's designs by Arnold F. Meyer & Co.
5	Barfield-Staples House	Barfield-Staples House	September 12, 1985 (#85002017)	5461-5463 Danbury Rd. 43°06′57″N 87°54′04″W	Whitefish Bay	Limestone-clad, Tudor Revival-styled duplex built in 1924 by Arnold F. Meyer & Co. using one of Ernest Flagg's designs.
6	Thomas Bossert House	Thomas Bossert House	September 12, 1985 (#85002018)	2614 E. Menlo Blvd. 43°05′03″N 87°52′36″W	Shorewood	Limestone-clad, 2-story French Provincial-styled home with a square tower at each corner, built in 1925 by Arnold F. Meyer & Co. using Ernest Flagg's system.
7	Brown Deer School	Brown Deer School	December 10, 1993 (#93001427)	4800 W. Green Brook Dr. 43°10′56″N 87°58′18″W	Brown Deer	Simple, frame, rural one-room schoolhouse, built in 1884 by Friedrich Gierach and expanded in 1900. Served students until 1922, then housed St. Paul's Lutheran, then Witt Sheetmetal. Now restored as a school museum.
8	Church Street Historic District	Church Street Historic District	August 10, 1989 (#89001099)	1448-1630 Church St. and 7758 W. Menomonee River Pkwy. 43°03′05″N 88°00′36″W	Wauwatosa	One-block neighborhood of historic homes and one church on Wauwatosa's first residential street, ranging from the 1857 Carpenter Gothic-style Hart house to the 1920 Prairie Style Nase house.
9	Benjamin Church House	Benjamin Church House	February 23, 1972 (#72000059)	Parkway Dr., Eastabrook Park; 43°05′29″N 87°53′53″W	Shorewood	Modest Temple-style Greek Revival home built by carpenter Benjamin Church in 1843-44 for his own family. Believed to be the oldest surviving house in Milwaukee.
10	Erwin Cords House	Erwin Cords House	September 12, 1985 (#85002019)	1913 E. Olive St. 43°05′36″N 87°53′09″W	Shorewood	Limestone-clad, 1.5-story home built in 1925 by Arnold F. Meyer & Co. using Ernest Flagg's system, similar to a design in Flagg's book, and similar to McCall's Magazine's 1924 demonstration home.
11	Cudahy Chicago and North Western Railway Depot	Cudahy Chicago and North Western Railway Depot	September 18, 2013 (#13000750)	4647 South Kinnickinnic Avenue; 42°57′36″N 87°51′52″W	Cudahy	Queen Anne-styled station built in 1893 at Patrick Cudahy's urging to serve the community growing around his new meat-packing plant.
12	Jeremiah Curtin House	Jeremiah Curtin House	November 7, 1972 (#72000060)	8685 W. Grange Ave. 42°56′40″N 88°01′19″W	Greendale	Boyhood home of Jeremiah Curtin, linguist and folklorist. Built about 1846, with 18-inch walls of local limestone.
13	Lowell Damon House	Lowell Damon House	February 23, 1972 (#72000061)	2107 N. Wauwatosa Ave. 43°03′22″N 88°00′28″W	Wauwatosa	Wauwatosa's oldest residence, built 1844-46 by immigrants from New Hampshire who mixed Colonial and Greek Revival styles in a way unusual for Wisconsin.
14	H. R. Davis House	H. R. Davis House	September 12, 1985 (#85002020)	6839 Cedar St. 43°02′26″N 87°59′48″W	Wauwatosa	Another Flagg-system home built by Meyer & Co., this one 1.5 stories and clad in Tennessee quartzite, with a steep Tudor Revival roofline, ridge dormers, and round-capped chimneys. Built 1924.
15	Elderwood	Elderwood	December 4, 1980 (#80000165)	6789 N. Elm Tree Rd. 43°08′24″N 87°55′10″W	Glendale	2-story concrete cottage with red tile jerkinhead roof designed by Eugene Liebert for Milwaukee decorator Charles Solomon in 1909. Later the summer home of Gustav Trostel of the Trostel Tannery, who developed the surrounding land as a botanical garden.
16	EMBA Shipwreck (Self-Unloading Barge)		July 3, 2013 (#13000468)	5 miles East of North Point in Lake Michigan; 43°03′54″N 87°44′59″W	Lake Michigan	181-foot schooner-barge built in 1890 by Frank Wheeler Company of West Bay City. Hauled bulk coal, grain and lumber around Lake Michigan as a tow-barge. Converted to a self-unloader in 1923 to haul coal, and renamed for Employes' Mutual Benefit Association. Scuttled in 1933, considered obsolete.
17	J. H. Fiebing House	J. H. Fiebing House	September 12, 1985 (#85002021)	7707 Stickney; 43°03′31″N 88°00′37″W	Wauwatosa	Another Flagg-system home built by Meyer & Co. This one too is 1.5 stories and clad in Tennessee quartzite, with a steep Tudor Revival roofline, ridge dormers, and round-capped chimneys. Built in 1925 for Fiebing, the head of a chemical company and Arnold Meyer's father-in-law.
18	George Gabel House	George Gabel House	September 12, 1985 (#85002023)	4600 N. Cramer St. 43°05′59″N 87°53′10″W	Whitefish Bay	Another Flagg-system home built in 1925 by Meyer & Co. - this one 1.5 stories and clad in limestone, with a U-shaped footprint, ridge dormers, round-capped chimneys, and an attached garage.
19	Warren B. George House	Warren B. George House	September 12, 1985 (#85002024)	7105 Grand Pkwy. 43°02′15″N 88°00′03″W	Wauwatosa	Another Flagg-system home built in 1925 by Meyer & Co. - this one 1.5 stories and clad in limestone, with a square corner tower, a wood-shake roof, and round-capped chimneys.
20	Grace A. Channon (canaller) Shipwreck		December 4, 2017 (#100001874)	12.75 miles (20.52 km) NE of the Bender Park boat launch in L. Michigan; 42°55′46″N 87°36′07″W	Oak Creek	Largely intact 141-foot wooden 3-masted schooner designed to fit maximum cargo through the Welland Canal, built in 1873 by Ellenwood & Co. of East Saginaw, and named for the daughter of an owner. Mostly hauled grain east and coal west on the Great Lakes. In August 1877, she was struck by the propeller-driven steam barge Favorite and quickly sank.
21	Greendale Historic District	Greendale Historic District	July 29, 2005 (#05000763)	Roughly bounded by W. Grange Ave. and Catalpa St. 42°56′29″N 87°59′45″W	Greendale	Planned 'greenbelt town' outside Milwaukee, designed by the U.S. government and built 1936-38 with help from several New Deal agencies, aiming to create jobs and affordable housing.
22	Greenfield School	Greenfield School	March 29, 2006 (#06000207)	8405 W. National Ave. 43°00′41″N 88°01′03″W	West Allis	Cream brick, Romanesque Revival-styled two-room school, built in 1887. Now houses the West Allis Historical Museum.
23	Harrison Hardie House	Harrison Hardie House	September 12, 1985 (#85002026)	4540 N. Cramer St. 43°05′58″N 87°53′10″W	Whitefish Bay	Another Flagg-system home built in 1925 by Meyer & Co. - this one 2 stories and clad in limestone, with a half-basement and an attached garage with an unusual arched-stone doorway.
24	Thomas B. Hart House	Thomas B. Hart House	October 10, 1985 (#85003135)	1609 Church St. 43°03′07″N 88°00′37″W	Wauwatosa	Gothic Revival cottage with elaborate bargeboards, probably built in the 1840s, possibly for blacksmith Perley J. Shumway. Later home to prominent businessman Thomas B. Hart and Dr. Stanley J. Seeger.
25	Horace W. Hatch House	Horace W. Hatch House	September 12, 1985 (#85002027)	739 E. Beaumont; 43°07′09″N 87°54′01″W	Whitefish Bay	Another Flagg-system home built in 1925 by Meyer & Co. - this one 1.5 stories, Tudor Revival style, and clad in limestone, with an octagonal tower that contains a stairway to the second floor.
26	Seneca W. & Bertha Hatch House	Seneca W. & Bertha Hatch House	September 12, 1985 (#85002028)	3821 N. Prospect Ave. 43°05′12″N 87°52′48″W	Shorewood	Another Flagg-system home built in 1924 by Meyer & Co. - 1.5 stories, Tudor Revival style, and clad in limestone, with an octagonal tower that contains a stairway to the second floor. Similar to Horace Hatch house above.
27	Henni Hall	Henni Hall	July 24, 1974 (#74000103)	3257 S. Lake Dr. 42°58′56″N 87°52′19″W	St. Francis	4.5-story Roman Catholic seminary designed by Victor Schulte and built in 1855 at St. Francis de Sales Seminary.
28	Holy Family Roman Catholic Church Complex		July 6, 2021 (#100006695)	3767 East Underwood Ave., 3750, 3776 East Hammond Ave. 42°57′00″N 87°51′19″W	Cudahy	Three buildings: neo-Gothic Revival-style church designed by Francis Gurda and built in 1931, Colonial Revival-style convent built in 1954, and the school built in 1958.
29	Honey Creek Parkway	Honey Creek Parkway	July 8, 2010 (#10000458)	Located between STH 181 at I-94 and N. 72nd St. 43°01′58″N 88°00′52″W	Wauwatosa	Urban park following Honey Creek, designed by Alfred Boerner and built 1932-1941 during the Great Depression by the federal work-relief agencies the Civilian Conservation Corps and the Works Progress Administration.
30	Willis Hopkins House	Willis Hopkins House	September 12, 1985 (#85002030)	325 Glenview Ave. 43°02′03″N 88°01′01″W	Wauwatosa	Another Flagg-system home built in 1925 by Meyer & Co. - 1.5 stories, Tudor Revival style, and clad in limestone, with ridge dormers and attached garage. Built on land that was the farm of Governor Harrison Ludington.
31	W. Ben Hunt Cabin	W. Ben Hunt Cabin	February 13, 2008 (#08000028)	5885 S. 116th St. 42°56′15″N 88°03′33″W	Hales Corners	1925 Rustic style cabin built for W. Ben Hunt, who wrote and illustrated articles on hand-crafts and Indian culture, including columns for Boys' Life. Now houses a museum of Native American crafts.
32	Halbert D. Jenkins House	Halbert D. Jenkins House	September 12, 1985 (#85002031)	1028 E. Lexington Blvd. 43°06′49″N 87°53′53″W	Whitefish Bay	Another Flagg-system home built in 1924 by Meyer & Co. - 1.5 stories, Cotswold Cottage style, and clad in coursed limestone, with shed dormers and attached garage.
33	Juneau Highlands Residential Historic District	Juneau Highlands Residential Historic District	March 21, 2011 (#11000116)	6600-6734 W. Grant St., 2109-2180 S. Livingston Terrace, 6608-6656 W. Revere Pl., and 6627-29 W. Revere Pl. 43°00′20″N 87°59′44″W	West Allis	Newer historic neighborhood of period revival homes built from 1928 to 1952, after Allis-Chalmers moved its plant to its new location nearby. Examples include the 1928 Hundley bungalow, the 1929 Mediterranean Revival Schwinn house, and the 1931 Tudor Revival Janowski house.
34	Kegel's Inn	Kegel's Inn	October 12, 2010 (#10000823)	5901-5905 W. National Ave. 43°01′04″N 87°59′10″W	West Allis	German restaurant and tavern, opened by Austrian immigrant John T. Kegel and wife Anna Bevec in 1933 at the end of Prohibition. The architectural style is Tudor Revival, designed by Mark F. Pfaller, with murals inside by German artist Peter Gries.
35	Kneeland-Walker House	Kneeland-Walker House	January 19, 1989 (#88003212)	7406 Hillcrest Dr. 43°03′19″N 88°00′15″W	Wauwatosa	1889 Queen Anne-style home with onion-domed tower, porte-cochère, and carriage house behind. Built for retired farmer and early Wauwatosa politician Norman Kneeland. Now a museum.
36	Kopperud Park Residential Historic District	Kopperud Park Residential Historic District	September 11, 2017 (#100001598)	837-871 S. 76th (odd only), 824-862 S. 77th (even only) & 7624 W. Walker Sts. 43°01′18″N 88°00′29″W	West Allis	Small neighborhood built 1935-38 on lots sold by the city with conditions to produce moderately-priced housing, supported by the New Deal Federal Housing Administration and the West Allis Better Housing Bureau. Includes the 1935 Tudor Revival Revercomb house, the 1935 Mediterranean Revival Schwan house, the 1937 Colonial Revival-styled Hansen house, and the 1937 Sears Roebuck McCreedy house.
37	Lawson Airplane Company-Continental Faience and Tile Company		September 3, 2001 (#01000964)	909 Menomonee Ave. 42°54′19″N 87°51′36″W	South Milwaukee	Lawson, located at this site from 1919-22, designed the first commercial passenger airplanes in the U.S., but couldn't quite get its business off the ground. Continental made art tile here from 1924-43. Complex now demolished.
38	LUMBERMAN shipwreck (schooner)		January 14, 2009 (#08001331)	10 miles (16 km) north of Wind Point; 42°52′10″N 87°45′25″W	Oak Creek	126-foot 3-masted wooden-hulled schooner, built in 1862 to carry forest products around Lake Michigan. Capsized in a storm in 1893.
39	John F. McEwens House	John F. McEwens House	September 12, 1985 (#85002032)	829 E. Lake Forest; 43°07′00″N 87°54′00″W	Whitefish Bay	Another Flagg-system home built in 1925 by Meyer & Co. - 1.5 stories, clad in limestone, with ridge dormers, three round-capped chimneys and attached garage. Inside, the living room has a stone fireplace and a beam and girder ceiling.
40	Alexander Herschel and Pauline G. McMicken House	Alexander Herschel and Pauline G. McMicken House	October 8, 2010 (#10000816)	1508 S. 80th St. 43°00′53″N 88°00′43″W	West Allis	Dutch Colonial Revival/Craftsman house built in 1909. Alexander helped develop the new community as Allis-Chalmers moved its plant there starting around 1902.
41	Henry A. Meyer House	Henry A. Meyer House	September 12, 1985 (#85002033)	3559 N. Summit Ave. 43°05′01″N 87°52′30″W	Shorewood	Another Flagg-system home built in 1925 by Meyer & Co. - 2.5 stories, Tudor Revival-styled, clad in limestone with a slate roof, with two eyebrow windows and attached garage. Henry was a brother of the builder, and president of the Milwaukee Tug Boat line.
42	Starke Meyer House	Starke Meyer House	September 12, 1985 (#85002034)	7896 N. Club Circle; 43°09′38″N 87°53′46″W	Fox Point	Another Flagg-system home built in 1925 by Meyer & Co. - 1.5 stories, clad in limestone with slate shingles, with two round-capped chimneys and one ridge dormer. Starke was a brother of the builder, and manager of the Milwaukee Tug Boat line.
43	Milwaukee County Home for Dependent Children-Administration Building	Milwaukee County Home for Dependent Children-Administration Building	January 7, 1999 (#98001587)	9508 Watertown Plank Rd. 43°02′46″N 88°01′53″W	Wauwatosa	3-story office building with hip roof designed by Robert A. Messmer and built in 1898. In its day, the complex included a boys' dorm and a girls' dorm in a park-like setting. Milwaukee County's facility handled cases that the state school at Sparta would not.
44	Milwaukee County School of Agriculture and Domestic Economy Historic District	Milwaukee County School of Agriculture and Domestic Economy Historic District	March 19, 1998 (#98000258)	9722 Watertown Plank Rd. 43°03′00″N 88°02′09″W	Wauwatosa	Early technical school, opened 1912. Campus designed by Alexander C. Eschweiler.
45	MILWAUKEE (steam screw) Shipwreck	MILWAUKEE (steam screw) Shipwreck	July 27, 2015 (#15000479)	3 mi. E. of Fox Point; 43°08′11″N 87°49′56″W	Fox Point	A steel-hulled train ferry built in 1902 that sank in 1929, taking her whole crew with her.
46	George E. Morgan House	George E. Morgan House	September 12, 1985 (#85002035)	4448 N. Maryland Ave. 43°05′49″N 87°52′55″W	Shorewood	Another Flagg-system home built in 1926 by Meyer & Co. - two stories, Tudor Revival, clad in stone, with a hip roof, ridge dormers, and two round-capped chimneys.
47	Mount Hope Evangelical Lutheran Church		December 18, 2025 (#100012389)	8633 West Becher Street; 43°00′22″N 88°01′14″W	West Allis	Late Gothic Revival-style Lutheran church, with its original section designed by Hugo Logemann and built in 1949, with stained glass windows by Conrad Schmitt Studios of Milwaukee. An education wing was added in 1958, designed by Schutte-Phillips-Mochon with Modern Movement styling.
48	Muirdale Tuberculosis Sanatorium	Muirdale Tuberculosis Sanatorium	August 31, 2018 (#100002857)	10437 & 10457 W. Innovation Dr. 43°02′36″N 88°02′35″W	Wauwatosa	Hospital for treatment of TB, designed by Robert Messmer and built in 1915. The 5-story design was novel for Wisconsin, and influenced other sanatoria.
49	Mary L. Nohl Art Environment	Mary L. Nohl Art Environment	October 3, 2005 (#05001109)	7328 N. Beach Dr. 43°09′01″N 87°53′31″W	Fox Point	Embellished home and sculpture garden of folk artist Mary Nohl.
50	Pearl C. Norton House	Pearl C. Norton House	September 12, 1985 (#85002036)	2021 Church St. 43°03′25″N 88°00′36″W	Wauwatosa	Another Flagg-system home built in 1925 by Meyer & Co. - 1.5 stories, Tudor Revival, clad in limestone, with a hip roof, ridge dormers, round-capped chimneys, and the front entry through an octagonal tower.
51	Oak Creek Parkway	Oak Creek Parkway	June 27, 2011 (#11000416)	Between Grant Park at Hawthorne Ave. & Rawson Ave. 42°54′48″N 87°51′05″W	South Milwaukee	Urban park partly following Oak Creek, designed by Alfred Boerner and built in the 1930s with help from the Milwaukee County Department of Outdoor Relief, the Civilian Conservation Corps and the Works Progress Administration.
52	Painesville Chapel	Painesville Chapel	November 7, 1977 (#77000039)	2740 W. Ryan Rd. 42°52′23″N 87°57′08″W	Franklin	1852 Greek Revival-styled meeting hall of a group of German immigrant Freethinker farmers.
53	Range Line Road Bridge	Range Line Road Bridge	July 7, 2015 (#15000405)	Range Line Rd. over Milwaukee R. 43°10′14″N 87°56′41″W	River Hills	Reinforced concrete bridge across the Milwaukee River, sheathed in Waukesha-area limestone, designed by Henry W. Bogner and built in 1935, with pedestrian refuge bays in each pier.
54	Root River Parkway	Root River Parkway	January 29, 2013 (#12001253)	Between W. Layton Ave. & S. 76th St. 42°56′36″N 88°00′49″W	Greendale	String of urban parklands along the Root River, including Boerner Botanical Gardens and Whitnall Golf Course, built in the 1930s with help from the CCC, the WPA, Milwaukee County Department of Outdoor Relief, the National Youth Administration, and the Civil Works Administration.
55	Shorewood Village Hall	Shorewood Village Hall	September 7, 1984 (#84003739)	3930 N. Murray Ave. 43°05′18″N 87°53′05″W	Shorewood	School built in 1908 which was re-purposed as a village hall in 1915 and remodeled in 1937.
56	South Milwaukee Passenger Station	South Milwaukee Passenger Station	August 3, 1978 (#78000119)	Milwaukee Ave. 42°54′35″N 87°51′47″W	South Milwaukee	Romanesque-styled brick railway station of the C&NW built in 1893.
57	South Milwaukee Post Office	South Milwaukee Post Office	October 24, 2000 (#00001251)	2210 Tenth Ave. 42°54′33″N 87°51′40″W	South Milwaukee	1931 Classical revival U.S. post office.
58	Frederick Sperling House	Frederick Sperling House	September 12, 1985 (#85002037)	1016 E. Lexington Blvd. 43°06′49″N 87°53′54″W	Whitefish Bay	Another Flagg-system home built by Meyer & Co., this one 2 stories and clad in Tennessee quartzite, with a steep Tudor Revival roofline, round-capped chimneys, and a square tower. Built 1924.
59	Sunnyhill Home	Sunnyhill Home	September 25, 1997 (#97001268)	8000 W. Milwaukee Ave. 43°03′11″N 88°00′46″W	Wauwatosa	Mansion of physician and amateur geologist, Dr. Fisk Holbrook Day, built in 1874 incorporating elements of Gothic Revival, Italianate, and Second Empire architectural styles.
60	Town of Milwaukee Town Hall	Town of Milwaukee Town Hall	October 9, 1986 (#86002852)	5909 N. Milwaukee River Pkwy. 43°07′33″N 87°55′48″W	Glendale	Town hall built in 1872, when the north half of Milwaukee County was mostly rural farmland. Served that role until 1962. Now a museum.
61	Transfer (self-unloading barge) Shipwreck	Transfer (self-unloading barge) Shipwreck	November 15, 2021 (#100007124)	6 miles (9.7 km) SE of the Milwaukee Harbor Breakwater Lighthouse in L. Michigan; 43°01′05″N 87°45′51″W	Milwaukee vicinity	200 feet (61.0 m) wooden-hulled craft built in Gibraltar, Michigan in 1872 as the 3-masted schooner-barge William McGregor, to be towed carrying iron ore from Lake Superior to Lake Erie ports for thirty years. Refitted in 1911 as a self-unloading tow barge Transfer to ferry coal from Milwaukee's coal yards to powerhouses. Scuttled in 1923.
62	Trimborn Farm	Trimborn Farm	July 31, 1980 (#80000170)	8801 W. Grange Ave. 42°56′39″N 88°01′26″W	Greendale	Lime kilns and farm buildings from the 1800s, when this farm was one of the major producers of high-quality lime in the state.
63	Herman Uihlein House	Herman Uihlein House	December 22, 1983 (#83004313)	5270 N. Lake Dr. 43°06′44″N 87°53′37″W	Whitefish Bay	Classic Beaux Arts-style mansion overlooking Lake Michigan, built for the head of Lavine Gear.
64	Fred W. Ullius Jr. House	Fred W. Ullius Jr. House	January 7, 1987 (#86003658)	5775 N. Santa Monica Blvd. 43°07′20″N 87°54′25″W	Whitefish Bay	Another Flagg-system home, this one built in 1925 by Robert Stanhope, 2 story Dutch Colonial Revival, clad in Lannon stone, with Flagg's signature round-capped chimneys.
65	William Van Altena House	William Van Altena House	September 12, 1985 (#85002038)	1916 E. Glendale; 43°06′00″N 87°53′07″W	Whitefish Bay	Another Flagg-system home built in 1925 by Meyer & Co., this one 1.5 stories, Tudor Revival-styled, clad in limestone, with a green slate roof, ridge dormers, round-capped chimneys, and entry through an octagonal tower.
66	G. B. Van Devan House	G. B. Van Devan House	September 12, 1985 (#85002039)	4601 N. Murray Ave. 43°05′59″N 87°53′06″W	Whitefish Bay	Another Flagg-system home built in 1925 by Meyer & Co., this one 1.5 stories, Tudor Revival-styled, clad in limestone, with ridge dormers, round-capped chimneys, and a limestone fireplace and beam and girder ceiling in the living room.
67	Wadham's Gas Station	Wadham's Gas Station	August 11, 2004 (#04000849)	1647 S. 76th St. 43°00′43″N 88°00′27″W	West Allis	One of Wadham's signature Japanese pagoda-style gas stations, designed by Alexander Eschweiler.
68	Washington Highlands Historic District	Washington Highlands Historic District	December 18, 1989 (#89002121)	Bounded by N. 68th St., W. Lloyd St., N. 60th St., and Milwaukee Ave. 43°03′14″N 87°59′33″W	Wauwatosa	Planned subdivision formed from Frederick Pabst's hops and Percheron farm. Designed by Werner Hegemann's firm, influenced by the garden city movement, which aimed to create a pleasant and healthy place to live. Homes built in various architectural styles from 1919 on.
69	Wauwatosa Arcade Building	Wauwatosa Arcade Building	March 21, 1997 (#97000270)	7210-26 W. North Ave. 43°03′39″N 88°00′08″W	Wauwatosa	2-story commercial/residential block built in 1928, with parapets and a roof of red barrel tile that suggest Spanish Colonial Revival and Mission styles.
70	Wauwatosa Avenue Residential Historic District	Wauwatosa Avenue Residential Historic District	June 20, 2012 (#12000354)	1809-1845 (odd only) & 1907 to 2242 Wauwatosa, & 7606 & 7624 Stickney Aves. 43°03′31″N 88°00′27″W	Wauwatosa	Old neighborhood with 31 contributing houses in various styles, including the 1868 front-gabled Pelton house, the 1896 Queen Anne Hulburt house, the 1914 Spanish Colonial Revival Underwood Apartments, the 1918 Mediterranean Revival Kirchhoff house, the 1919 Craftsman Meyer house, the 1922 Arts and Crafts Hall house, the 1922 American Foursquare Netter house, the 1925 Tudor Revival Godfrey house, and the 1927 Colonial Revival Parrish house.
71	Wauwatosa Cemetery Chapel		June 12, 2023 (#100008855)	2445 Wauwatosa Ave. 43°03′47″N 88°00′35″W	Wauwatosa	Greek Revival-style church built in 1853 of brick as First Baptist Church. Used as an armory from 1905 to 1914, with its bell tower removed. Moved to its current location in 1915 to be a funeral chapel, when the stucco and front portico were added. Served that function until 1951.
72	Wauwatosa Woman's Club Clubhouse	Wauwatosa Woman's Club Clubhouse	July 1, 1998 (#98000828)	1626 Wauwatosa Ave. 43°03′08″N 88°00′24″W	Wauwatosa	2-story Colonial Revival-styled social center for women designed by Kirchoff & Rose and built in 1924.
73	West Allis Post Office	West Allis Post Office	February 23, 2001 (#01000174)	7440 W. Greenfield Ave. 43°01′01″N 88°00′19″W	West Allis	2-story U.S. post office built in 1939 in Stripped Classical style. Contains two murals painted by Frances Foy.
74	Frank J. Williams House	Frank J. Williams House	September 12, 1985 (#85002040)	912 E. Lexington Blvd. 43°06′49″N 87°53′59″W	Whitefish Bay	One last Flagg-system home, built in 1925 by Meyer & Co., this one 2 stories, Tudor Revival-styled, clad in limestone, with ridge dormers, round-capped chimneys, a stone fireplace, and beam and girder ceiling through the first floor.

== Former listings ==
	Name on the Register	Image	Date listed	Date removed	Location	City or town	Description
1	Clark Row House		January 16, 1986 (#86000102)	April 27, 1989	2103-2109 W. Kilbourn Ave.	Milwaukee	3-story row-house, designed by Charles Fitzgerald in Neoclassical style and built by A. Herbe in 1893.
2	Paul S. Grant House	Paul S. Grant House	September 12, 1985 (#85002025)	July 6, 2022	984 E. Circle Dr. 43°06′55″N 87°53′55″W	Whitefish Bay	Another Flagg-system home built in 1925 by Meyer & Co. - this one 1.5 stories Cotswold Cottage style, and clad in limestone, with a stone fireplace, square-topped chimneys, and an attached garage.
3	Milwaukee County Home for Dependent Children School		December 17, 1998 (#98001535)	September 6, 2002	9658 Watertown Plank Road	Wauwatosa	2-story brick school designed by Robert and John Messmer in Collegiate Gothic style and built in 1924.
4	Old Coast Guard Station	Old Coast Guard Station	August 7, 1989 (#89001047)	July 1, 2009	1600 N. Lincoln Memorial Drive	Milwaukee	Prairie School building with 3-story square tower designed by Victor Mendleheff and built in 1915. Demolished in march, 2008.
5	Old St. Peter's Church	Old St. Peter's Church	July 25, 1974 (#74002338)	November 3, 1983	3257 S. Lake Dr.	St. Francis	Small, clapboard Gothic Revival-styled Roman Catholic church built in 1838. Now moved to Old World Wisconsin.
6	Elizabeth Plankinton House	Elizabeth Plankinton House	April 1, 1976 (#76002287)	November 13, 1980	1492 W. Wisconsin Ave.	Milwaukee	3-story Richardsonian Romanesque mansion designed by E. Townsend Mix and built in 1886 by John Plankinton as a wedding gift for his daughter Elizabeth. Demolished in 1980.
7	William G. Spence House	William G. Spence House	September 13, 1991 (#91001393)	July 3, 1996	1741 N Farwell Ave.	Milwaukee	2.5-story Queen Anne-styled duplex built in 1883. Delisted due to extensive alteration.
8	Whitefish Bay National Guard Armory		June 6, 2002 (#02000650)	April 6, 2011	1225 E. Henry Clay St. 43°06′37″N 87°53′43″W	Whitefish Bay	Fortress-like 1929 National Guard training site, demolished in 2004.

== See also ==
- National Register of Historic Places listings in Milwaukee, Wisconsin
- List of National Historic Landmarks in Wisconsin
- National Register of Historic Places listings in Wisconsin
- Listings in neighboring counties: Ozaukee, Racine, Washington, Waukesha
