= Albert and Edith Adelman House =

Historic house in Wisconsin, United States

- U.S. National Register of Historic Places
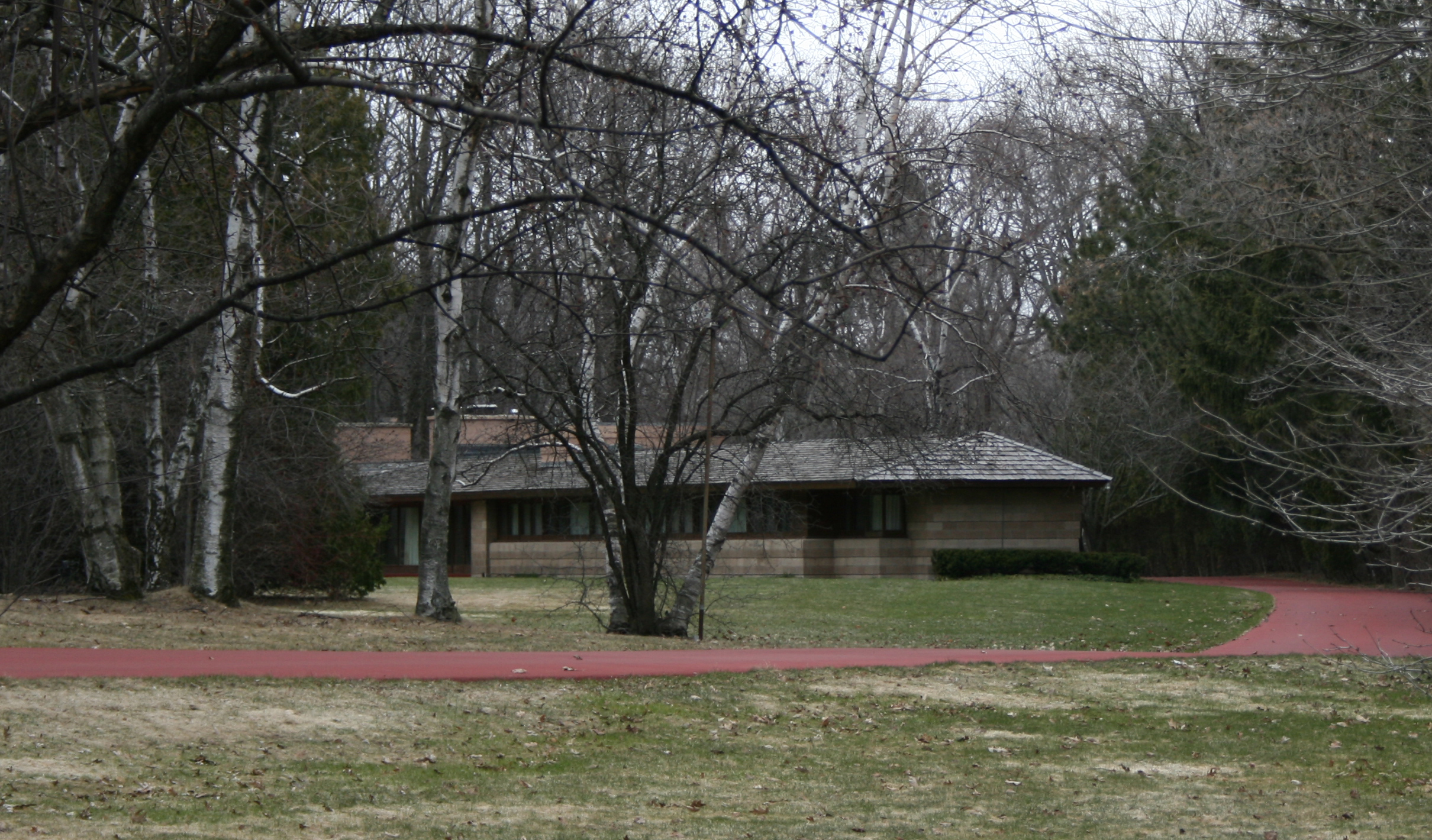

- Location within Wisconsin Location within the United States
- Location: 7111 N. Barnett Ln., Fox Point, Wisconsin
- Coordinates: 43°8′45″N 87°53′57″W
- Area: 2.5 acres (1.0 ha)
- Built: 1948
- Built by: Claude Debbink
- Architect: Frank Lloyd Wright
- Architectural style: Usonian-like
- NRHP reference No.: 05000951
- Added to NRHP: August 26, 2005

The Albert and Edith Adelman House is a mid-scale home in Fox Point, Wisconsin designed by Frank Lloyd Wright and built in 1948.

Albert "Ollie" Adelman and wife Edith had three young sons (Lynn, Gary & Craig) in 1948 when Ollie asked Frank Lloyd Wright to design a home for the family on his lot at Fox Point. The house should cost about $75,000. Albert was the son of Benjamin Adelman, who founded a large laundry and dry cleaning business in the Milwaukee area. Wright designed a number of projects for the Adelman family, including a laundry plant, three homes for Benjamin, and two for Albert. Of these, only this house and the Benjamin Adelman Residence in Phoenix (1951), were actually built. Wright's first design for the house, with brick walls and tile roof, would have cost $325,000 to build, far beyond Adelman's budget. Eventually Wright scaled down his plans to fit Adelman's budget.

The Adelman house brings together the long, low profile of some of Wright's turn-of-the-century Prairie School homes with Wright's Usonian ideals for low-maintenance buildings. It is built of buff-colored concrete block and cypress, neither of which requires paint or plaster. The roof is covered with hand split cedar shakes and has wide overhangs. Wright also designed many of the interior furnishings: shelves, wardrobes, desks and sofas. The 170-foot (52 m) long home has three bedrooms on one end, a kitchen and dining room at the other end, and a large living/reception area in the center. A covered walkway leads from the end of the house to the garage, forming an "L" shape.

This house is built on a long, 2.5-acre (1 ha) lot and set back well from the road at the end of a long, winding drive. The lot has a deep, wooded ravine at one end. The house sits at the rear of the lot, overlooking the ravine, and faces south/southeast to take maximum advantage of natural light.

The house, still occupied by members of the Adelman family, was restored in 2015 by Kubala Washatko Architects.

== See also ==
- List of Frank Lloyd Wright works
- National Register of Historic Places listings in Milwaukee County, Wisconsin
