= Arnold F. Meyer & Co. =

Historic house in Wisconsin, United States

Arnold F. Meyer and/or his firm the Arnold F. Meyer & Co. was a builder in Milwaukee, Wisconsin. The firm was incorporated in 1924. Meyer and his firm built a number of buildings according to designs of architect Ernest Flagg that are listed on the National Register of Historic Places.

Meyer had previously been associated with the Rath Construction Company where he became acquainted with Flagg's methods for construction of small homes. In 1924, Meyer formed Arnold F. Meyer & Company, Inc. to build small homes using Flagg's methods. The company built four such houses, all of them for Meyer's members. At least 25 of the homes were built, but the company went out of business by the end of 1925.

Buildings that were built by Meyer or his company include:

- Rufus Arndt House, 4524 N. Cramer St., Whitefish Bay, Wisconsin (Arnold F. Meyer & Co.) NRHP-listed
- Barfield-Staples House, 5461—5463 Danbury Rd., Whitefish Bay, Wisconsin (Arnold F. Meyer & Co.) NRHP-listed
- Thomas Bossert House, 2614 E. Menlo Blvd., Shorewood, Wisconsin (Arnold F. Meyer & Co.) NRHP-listed
- Erwin Cords House, 1913 E. Olive St., Shorewood, Wisconsin (Arnold F. Meyer) NRHP-listed
- H. R. Davis House, 6839 Cedar St., Wauwatosa, Wisconsin (Arnold F. Meyer & Co.) NRHP-listed
- J. H. Fiebing House, 7707 Stickney, Wauwatosa, Wisconsin (Arnold F. Meyer & Co.) NRHP-listed
- Otto F. Fiebing House, 302 N. Hawley Rd., Milwaukee, Wisconsin (Arnold F. Meyer) NRHP-listed
- George Gabel House, 4600 N. Cramer St., Whitefish Bay, Wisconsin (Arnold F. Meyer & Co.) NRHP-listed
- Warren B. George House, 7105 Grand Pkwy., Wauwatosa, Wisconsin (Arnold F. Meyer & Co.) NRHP-listed
- Paul S. Grant House, 984 E. Circle Dr., Whitefish Bay, Wisconsin (Arnold F. Meyer & Co.) NRHP-listed
- Harrison Hardie House, 4540 N. Cramer St., Whitefish Bay, Wisconsin (Arnold F. Meyer & Co.) NRHP-listed
- Horace W. Hatch House, 739 E. Beaumont, Whitefish Bay, Wisconsin (Arnold F. Meyer & Co.) NRHP-listed
- Seneca W. & Bertha Hatch House, 3821 N. Prospect Ave., Shorewood, Wisconsin (Arnold F. Meyer) NRHP-listed
- Alfred M. Hoelz House, 3449—3451 Frederick Ave., Milwaukee, Wisconsin (Arnold F. Meyer & Co.) NRHP-listed
- Willis Hopkins House, 325 Glenview, Wauwatosa, Wisconsin (Arnold F. Meyer & Co.) NRHP-listed
- Halbert D. Jenkins House, 1028 E. Lexington Blvd., Whitefish Bay, Wisconsin (Arnold F. Meyer & Co.) NRHP-listed
- John F. McEwens House, 829 E. Lake Forest, Whitefish Bay, Wisconsin (Arnold F. Meyer & Co.) NRHP-listed
- Henry A. Meyer House, 3559 N. Summit Ave., Shorewood, Wisconsin (Arnold F. Meyer & Co.) NRHP-listed
- Starke Meyer House, 7896 N. Club Circle, Fox Point, Wisconsin (Arnold F. Meyer & Co.) NRHP-listed
- George E. Morgan House, 4448 N. Maryland Ave., Shorewood, Wisconsin (Arnold F. Meyer & Co.) NRHP-listed
- Pearl C. Norton House, 2021 Church St., Wauwatosa, Wisconsin (Arnold F. Meyer & Co.) NRHP-listed
- Frederick Sperling House, 1016 E. Lexington Blvd., Whitefish Bay, Wisconsin (Arnold F. Meyer & Co.) NRHP-listed
- William Van Altena House, 1916 E. Glendale, Whitefish Bay, Wisconsin (Arnold F. Meyer & Co.) NRHP-listed
- G. B. Van Devan House, 4601 N. Murray Ave., Whitefish Bay, Wisconsin (Arnold F. Meyer & Co.) NRHP-listed
- Frank J. Williams House, 912 E. Lexington Blvd., Whitefish Bay, Wisconsin (Arnold F. Meyer & Co.) NRHP-listed
