= St. Mary Parish School =

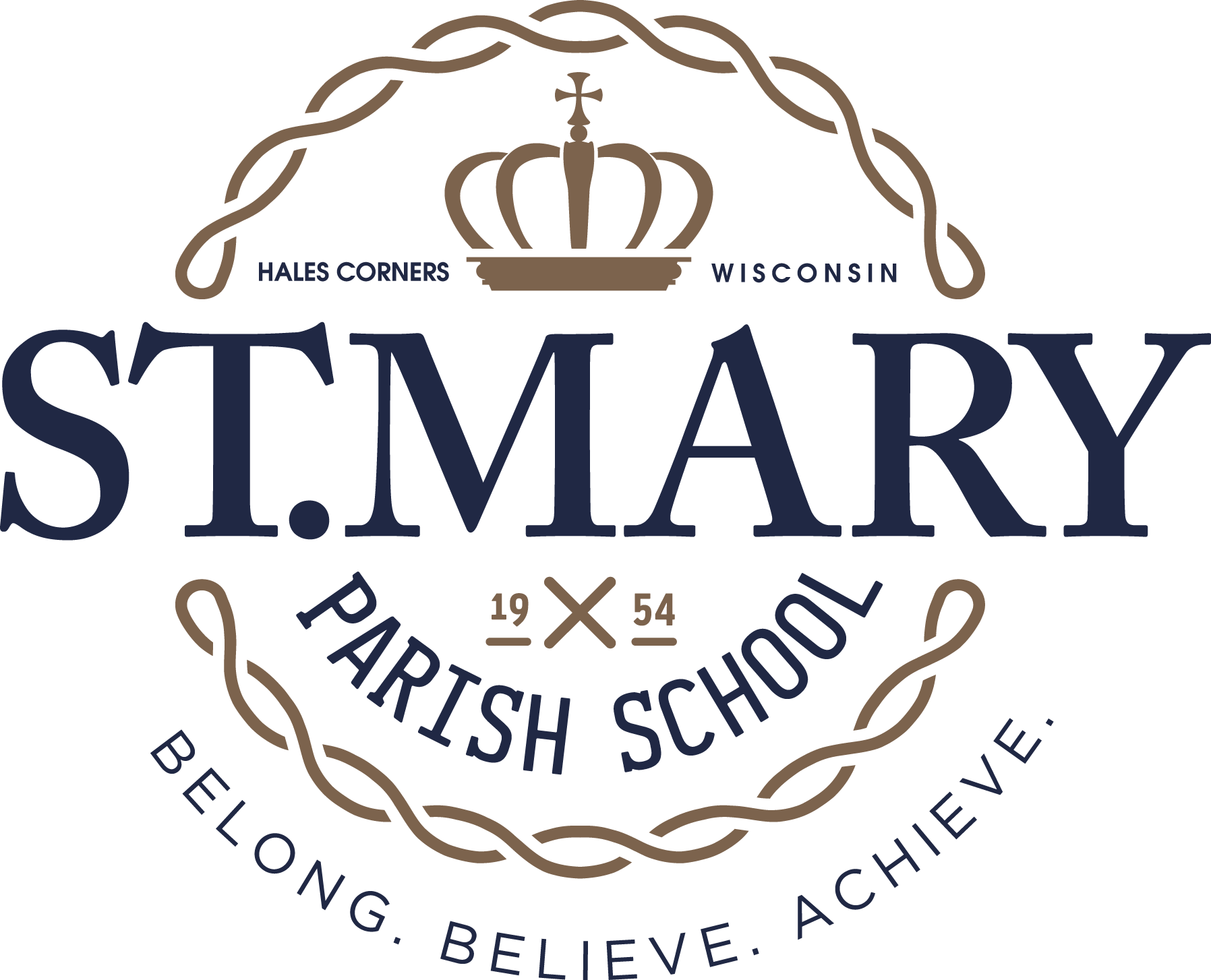
- St Mary Parish School Logo

Location
- 9553 West Edgerton Avenue; Hales Corners, (Milwaukee County), Wisconsin 53130; United States

Information
- Type: Private
- Motto: Belong. Believe. Achieve.
- Religious affiliation: Roman Catholic
- Patron saint: Mary, Mother of Jesus
- Established: 1954
- Oversight: Archdiocese of Milwaukee
- Superintendent: Kathleen A. Cepelka, Ph.D.
- Principal: Dr. Mark Joerres
- Staff: 46
- Grades: 3K - 8th
- Colors: Navy blue and Gold
- Team name: Royals
- Athletic director: Kevin Schalk
- Website: St Mary School website

St. Mary Parish School, founded by the School Sisters of St. Francis, held its first classes on September 8, 1954. Currently, 472 students are enrolled in grades 3K - 8.

== History ==
After the diocese raised $150,000 in pledges, construction of St. Mary's first school began in February 1953. The first school contained eight classrooms, a kitchen, and a hall. In addition, a convent was constructed to house the School Sisters of St. Francis, who served as the first teachers. By 1960 an additional 10 classrooms were added.

About 1980, due to the decline in the number of sisters, the convent was closed.

In 2012, three students from St. Mary's competed in the Future City Engineering Competition and won the national title.

The school is supported by the commitment of numerous parents and community members who volunteer regularly.

== Notable graduates ==
- Alyson Dudek, Olympic short track speed skater, 2004
