= Annunciation Greek Orthodox Church =

Historic church in Wisconsin, United States

- U.S. National Register of Historic Places
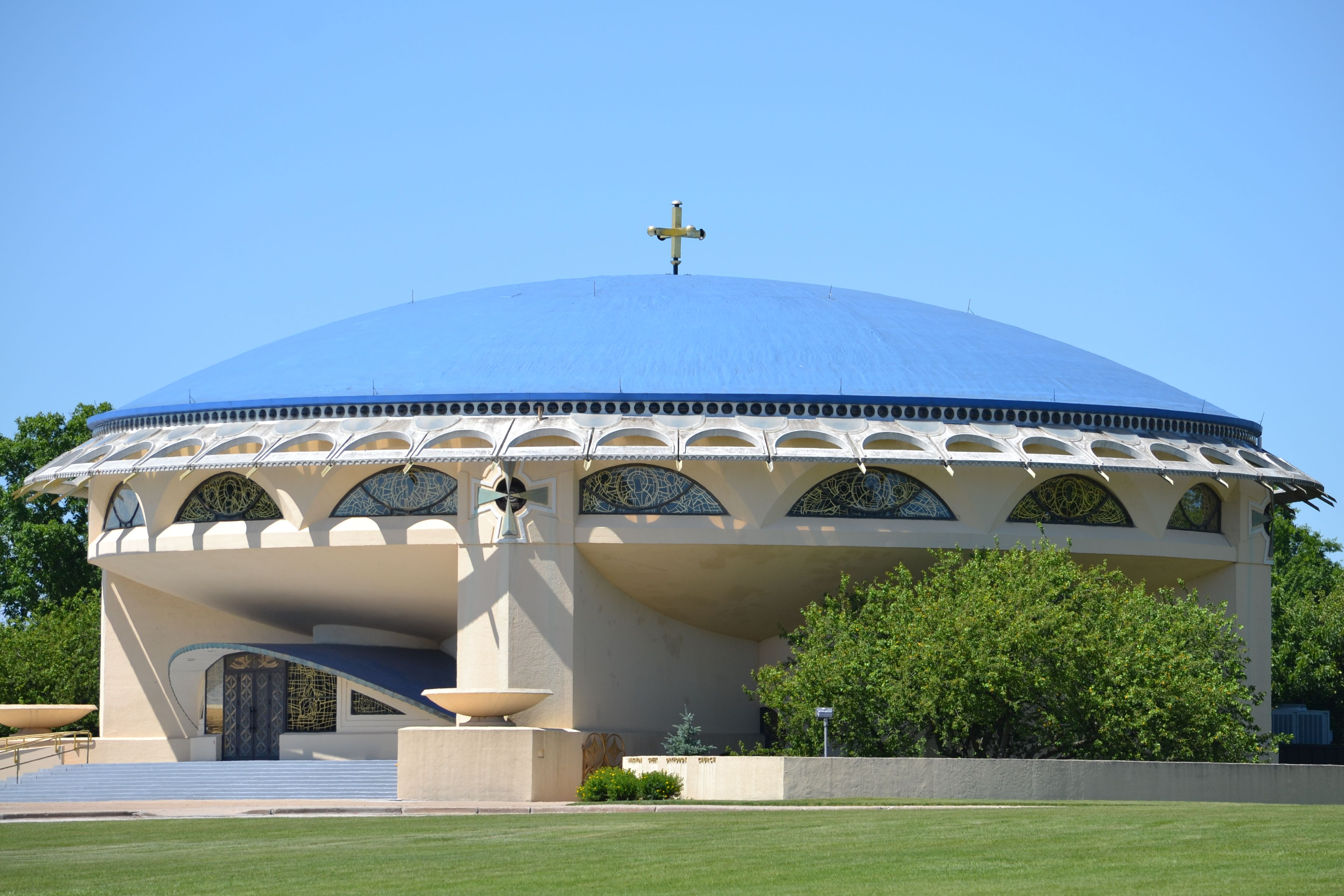
- The church in 2012

- Location within Wisconsin Location within the United States
- Location: 9400 West Congress Street, Wauwatosa, Wisconsin
- Coordinates: 43°5′56.05″N 88°1′43.95″W
- Built: 1959
- Architect: Frank Lloyd Wright
- NRHP reference No.: 74000100
- Added to NRHP: December 19, 1974

Annunciation Greek Orthodox Church in Wauwatosa, Wisconsin, United States, was designed by architect Frank Lloyd Wright in 1956, and completed in 1961. It is listed on the National Register of Historic Places. The church is one of Wright's last works; construction was completed after his death. The design is informed by traditional Byzantine architectural forms, reinterpreted by Wright to suit the modern context. The church's shallow scalloped dome is similar to that of his Marin County Civic Center in California.

== Design ==
According to Bruce Brooks Pfeiffer (a Wright scholar and original archivist of the Frank Lloyd Wright Archives), "When he received a commission for a church for the Milwaukee Hellenic Community, Wright consulted his wife, who was brought up in the Greek Orthodox faith, about the predominant symbols of the church. 'The cross and the dome,' was her reply." These two architectural forms dominate the design. The floor plan itself is a Greek cross. Wide arches support the upper level, or balcony. The roof dome sits atop an inverted dome, or bowl. Through simplification and abstraction of the forms, Wright succeeded in artfully translating the cross and the dome from their historical Byzantine context to the vastly dissimilar setting of the twentieth-century American Midwest. Much of the building utilizes a gold-anodized aluminum which, at the time, was a new material that Alcoa established. Since its construction, there have been a few renovations due to structural problems—including the replacement of the dome's original exterior tile to a synthetic plastic resin.

While Wright's design was inspired by traditional Byzantine forms and the Hagia Sophia in particular, the church was not meant as a purely historicist tribute; rather, it was an update and reinterpretation of architectural forms very much alive. In a letter dated September 9, 1958—when the project was well into the working drawings stages—Wright explained: "The edifice is in itself a complete work of modern art and science belonging to today but dedicated to ancient tradition—contributing to Tradition instead of living upon it."

== Gallery ==
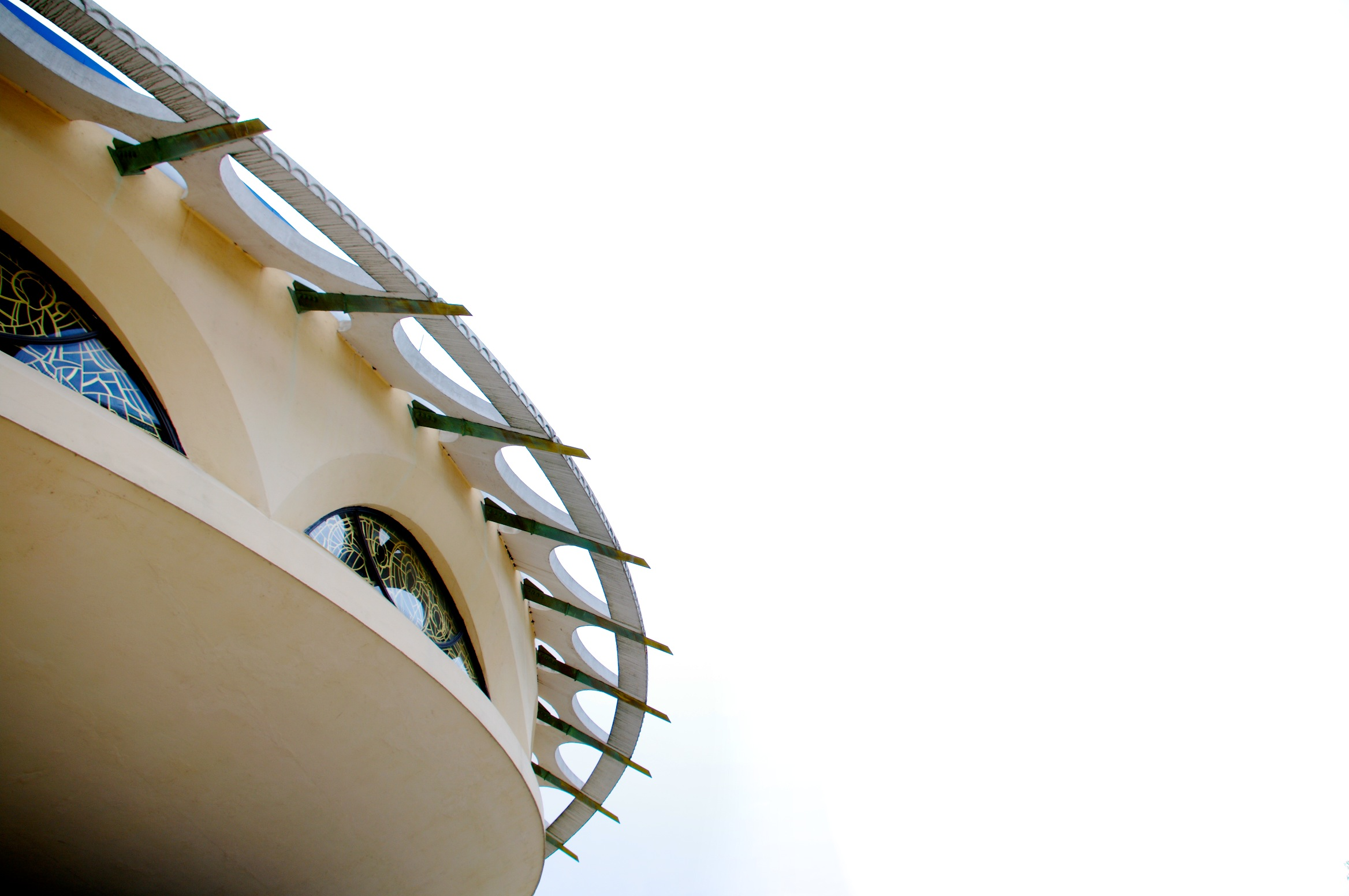

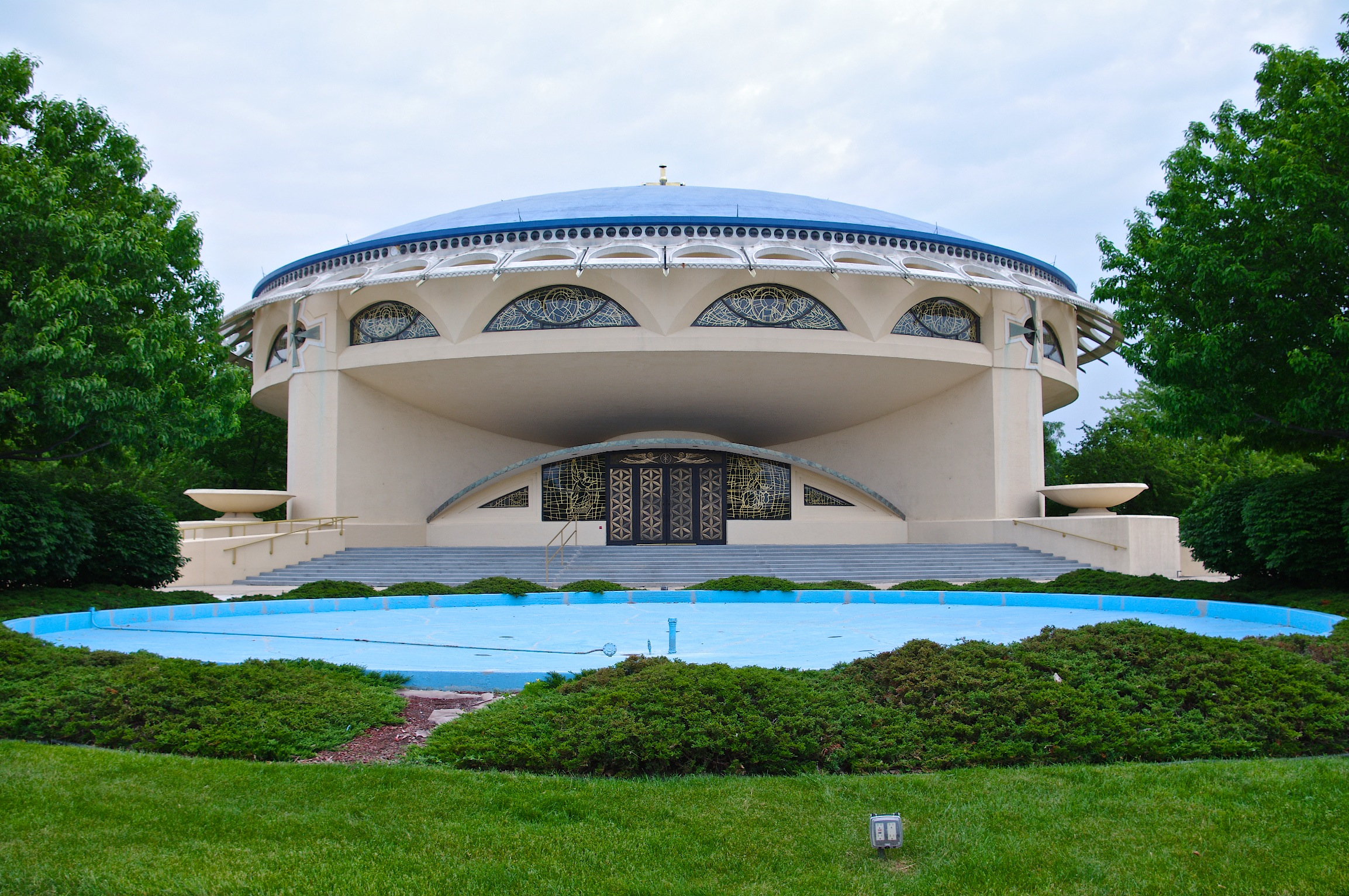

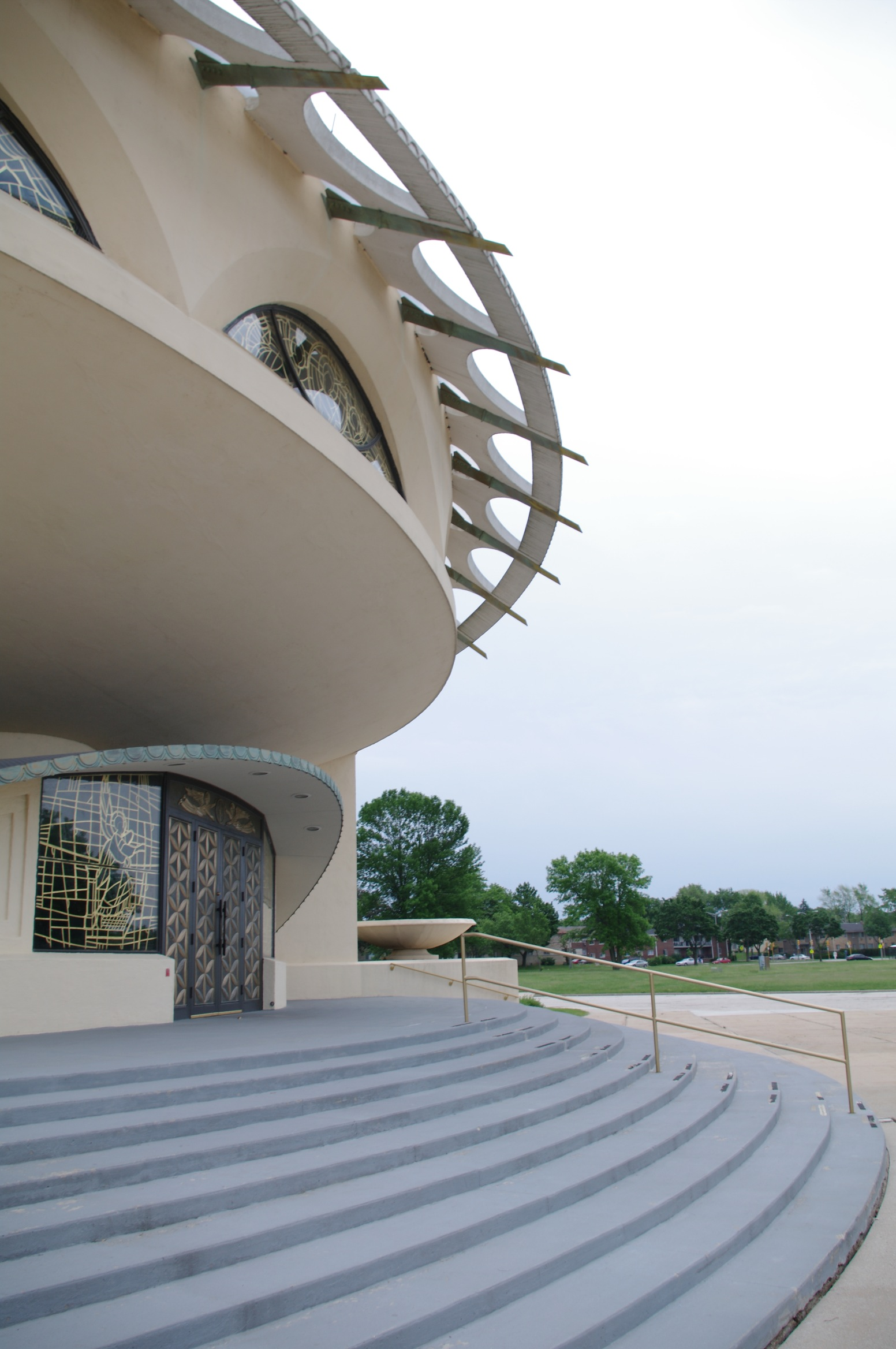

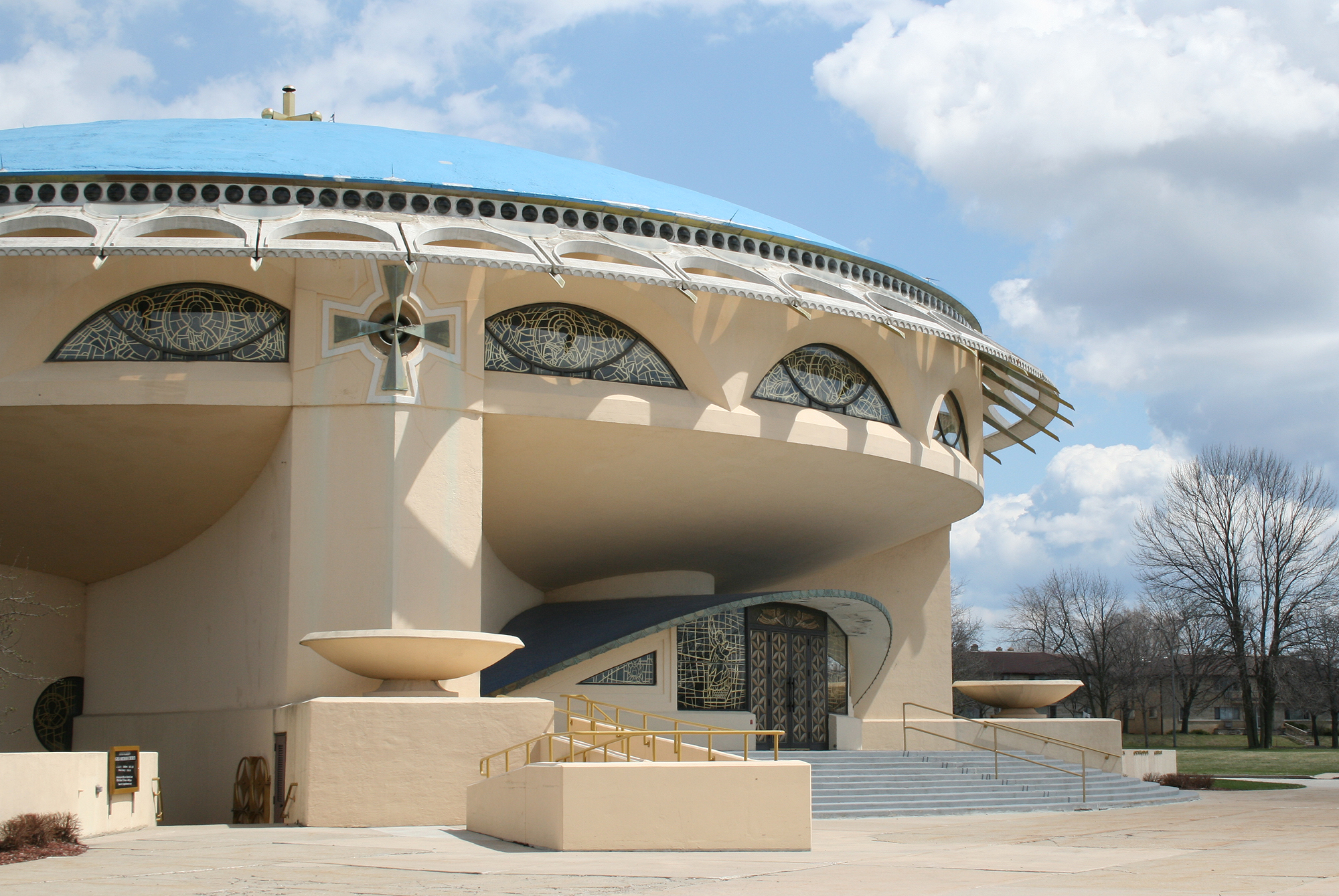

== See also ==
- List of Frank Lloyd Wright works
- National Register of Historic Places listings in Milwaukee County, Wisconsin
