= W. Ben Hunt Cabin =

Historic house in Wisconsin, United States

- U.S. National Register of Historic Places
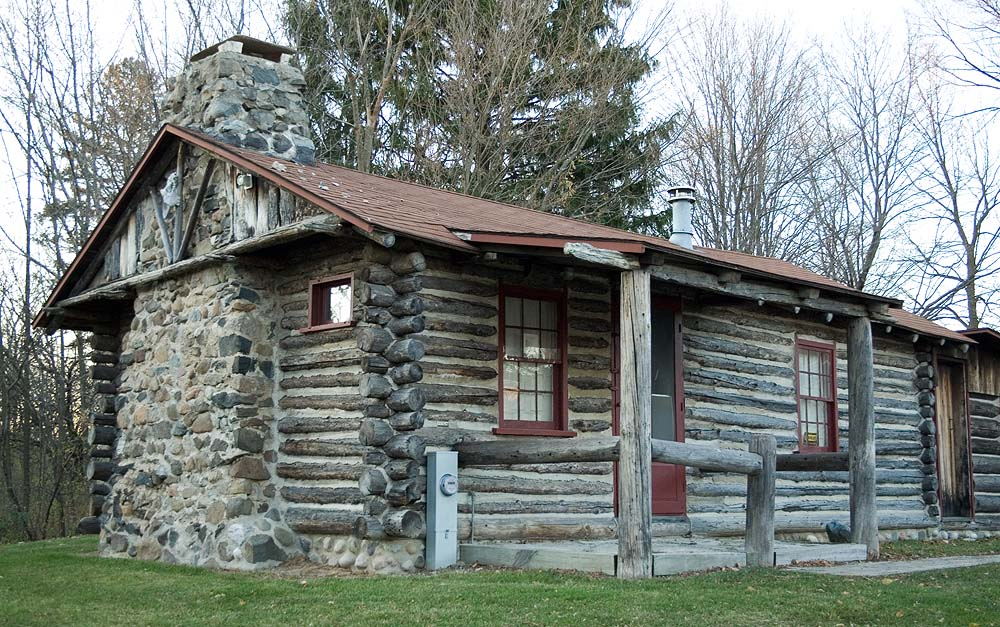
- W. Ben Hunt Cabin

- Location within Wisconsin Location within the United States
- Location: 5885 S 116th St. Hales Corners, Wisconsin
- Coordinates: 42°56′15.62″N 88°3′33.74″W
- Built: 1924
- Architect: W. Ben Hunt
- Architectural style: Rustic
- NRHP reference No.: 08000028
- Added to NRHP: February 13, 2008

The W. Ben Hunt Cabin is a Rustic-styled log cabin built by graphic artist W. Ben Hunt in 1924 in Hales Corners, Wisconsin, United States. It was added to the National Register of Historic Places in 2008.

== History ==
The cabin was built by artist and author W. Ben Hunt in his backyard. It started as an homage to his grandmother's cabin, where he spent part of his childhood, but it developed into a Rustic Style design. Hunt used the cabin to work on his art and his writings. In 1940, he added onto the structure. The cabin has since been moved from its original location to its current one and transformed into a museum.
