= Cotswold architecture =

Architectural design style

Cotswold Architecture
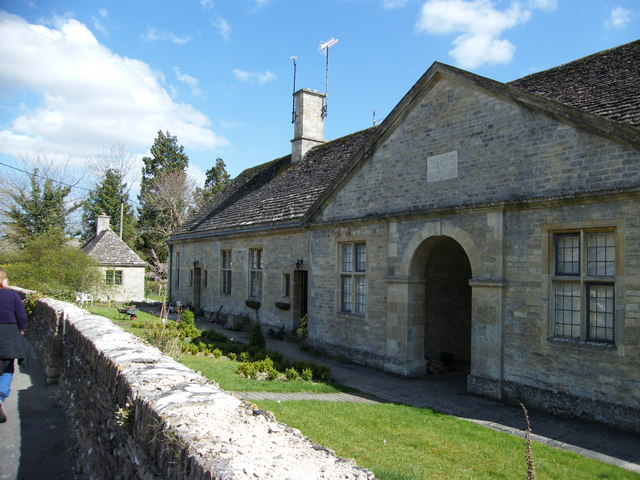
- Cotswold Cottage, Coln St. Aldwyns
- Location: England, United Kingdom
- Influences: Classical architecture, Tudor Revival

The Cotswold style of architecture is a style based on houses from the Cotswolds region of England. Cotswold houses often have a prominent chimney, often near the front door of the house. Other notable features include king mullions and steep roofs. The Cotswold style uses local materials based on geology. This style is renowned for the use of local oolitic limestone.

The Cotswold style emerged during the late 16th century and flourished throughout the 17th century. During the second and third decades of the twentieth century, the Cotswold style reached its zenith of popularity. The Cotswold 'Arts and Crafts' architecture was a very popular and prominent style between 1890 and 1930. The county of Gloucestershire in the Cotswolds became the focal point of the 'Arts and Crafts' architecture.

Cotswold architecture is a subtype of the Tudor Revival house style, and it likely came to the United States as a result of renewed interest in medieval housing styles.

== Influences ==
The Cotswold style of architecture is characterized by simplicity. The Cotswold buildings were built to "melt into their surroundings". The original Cotswold cottages were built for rural laborers, including farmers who reared sheep. Additionally, the rural location of the Cotswold region limited access to building materials. This style used local materials to create the distinctive look of the Cotswolds.

The Cotswold style later came to be influenced by the Classical style of architecture. These influences led to changes in the exteriors as well as interiors of Cotswold-style buildings. Classical influences to the exteriors included the use of stucco on walls, which often replaced the limewash on original buildings. The interiors also changed, as Cotswold-style buildings came to have higher and wider lights and “loftier” rooms. The architecture also changed during the Arts and Crafts Movement. Smaller buildings were built with a mix of concrete block and stonework or roughcast brick and stonework. This allowed architects to save on costs due to stone being expensive during the Arts and Crafts movement.

== Structural elements ==
The features of the Cotswold style are primarily identifiable through the use of specific materials. In the Cotswold region, oolite limestone and hard wood are abundant. Lead, on the other hand, was scarce throughout the 17th and 18th centuries, so it is not utilized in any traditional buildings of the Cotswold style. One use of limestone in the Cotswold region was called limestone walling. This technique gives a range of color to the Cotswold style due to the amount of iron oxide in the limestone layer. The limestone was also used as slates for the Cotswold roofing.

=== Exteriors ===
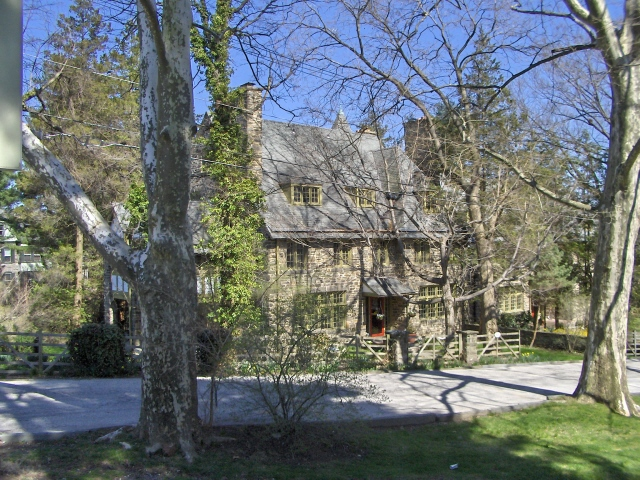
Cotswold-style house at 300-04 West Willow Grove Avenue, in the Chestnut Hill section of Philadelphia, Pennsylvania (1913), Duhring, Okie & Ziegler, architects.

The leading feature of Cotswold architecture is the grouping of the gables. Since lead was not available, slate was used in its place. Henry Ford is noted to have appreciated the "distinctive architectural style and attractive weathered appearance of typical Cotswold buildings," whose stone elements "all blended together unbroken by other visible construction materials." Due to the steepness of the roofs, most original Cotswold cottages had dormer windows and were not waterproof. Occasionally, lead was employed in gutter systems around the roof. As a result of the roof angles, roofs made with pseudo-thatch, steep arch gables, and arched doorways are all common features of the Cotswold style.

Like the roofs, the walls of Cotswold residences were susceptible to the elements. Though the walls were thick, they were hollow and filled with rocks and "rubbish" and were not reinforced with any binding materials. The stone slates were naturally thick. The walls had to compensate by being thicker than the slates in Cotswold traditional houses in order for the building to be supported.

The king mullion is a common element of the Cotswold style. The windows of Cotswold cottages were glazed with lead. In smaller structures, the windows were the only elements in which lead was used.

=== Interiors ===
Buildings of the Cotswold style typically have one or two large fireplaces, depending on the size and function of the building. The fireplaces both release into a chimney. The interiors of the chimneys as well as the mantles are made of stone.

The rooms of residence constructed in the Cotswold style are often small and irregularly shaped. The floorplan of a Cotswold cottage is generally bisected by a staircase, and the bedrooms are on the first floor. These staircases, along with the internal walls, are made of wood. Traditionally, oak, chestnut, and beech, all native to the Cotswold region, were used.

== Examples ==
=== In England ===
- Bibury
- Bourton-on-the-Water
- Broadway, Worcestershire
- Castle Combe
- Cirencester
- Coln St. Aldwyns
- Stow-on-the-Wold
- Upper Slaughter and Lower Slaughter

=== In Canada ===
- Devonshire Lodge, Ontario

=== In the United States ===
- Rufus Arndt House, Wisconsin
- Rose Cottage at the Henry Ford

=== In literature ===
- Dorset Academy, the setting of Richard Yates' A Good School and based on Avon Old Farms School, the preparatory school attended by the author

== See also ==
- Storybook house
- Tudor architecture
