= Church Street Historic District (Wauwatosa, Wisconsin) =

Historic district in Wisconsin, United States

- U.S. National Register of Historic Places
- U.S. Historic district
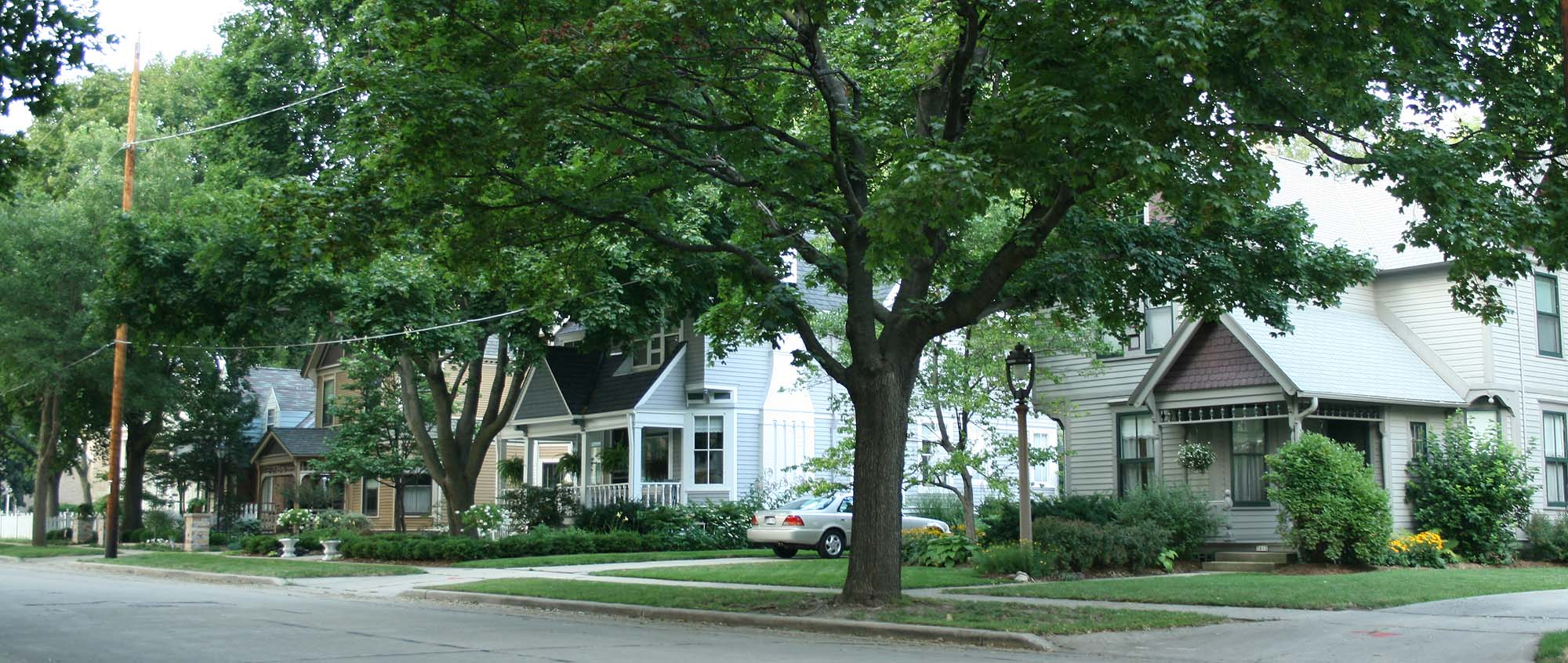
- Church Street Historic District

- Location within Wisconsin Location within the United States
- Location: Wauwatosa, Wisconsin
- Coordinates: 44°3′6″N 88°0′37″W
- NRHP reference No.: 89001099
- Added to NRHP: August 10, 1989

The Church Street Historic District is a one-block neighborhood of historic homes built from about 1857 to 1920. It was added to the National Register of Historic Places in 1989.

== History ==
Wauwatosa was founded in 1835, around the meeting of what is now Harwood Avenue and State Street. In 1853 a portion of the district was platted as the first residential street of Wauwatosa. The Congregational church constructed that year in what is now the district was the first religious structure built in the community, and gave Church Street its name.

Fourteen surviving historic structures comprise the district, exemplifying a typical progression of architectural styles for the U.S. They include, in roughly the order built:

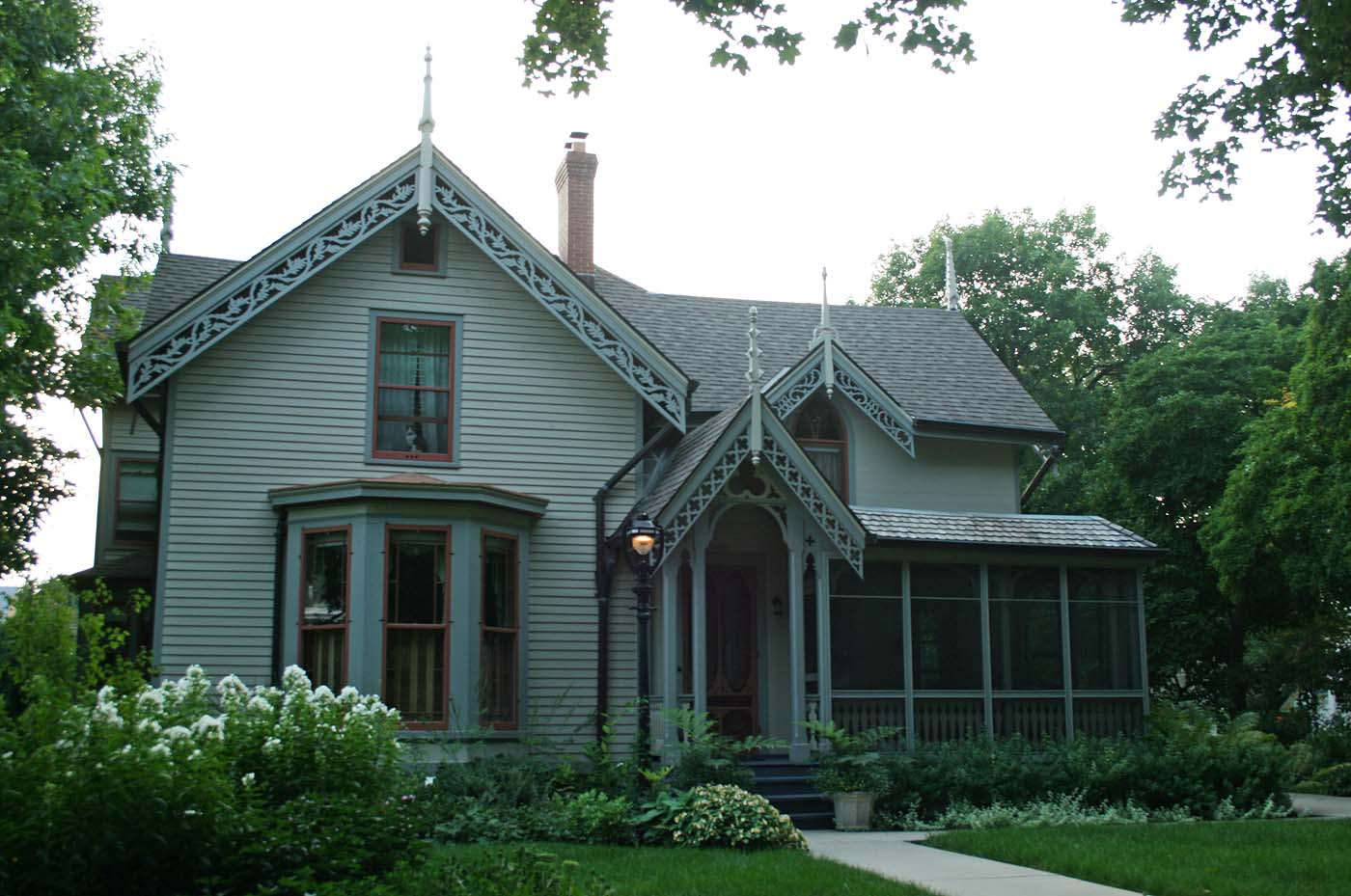
Thomas Hart house

- The Thomas B. Hart House at 1609 Church Street is a Carpenter Gothic-style home built about 1857. Hallmarks of the style are the steep roofs, the bay window, and particularly the ornate bargeboards decorating the ends of the gables. They are cut with jigsaws to a different pattern on each gable, including an oak-leaf motif above the bay, a quatrefoil-and-trefoil combination above the porch, etc. Hart helped start Wauwatosa by building a sawmill on the Menomonee River around 1838, and a gristmill a few years after.
- The A.F. Kellogg house at 1460 Church Street is a 2-story frame home built in Queen Anne style in 1885. The clapboard siding on the sides is broken by horizontal and vertical boards, a detail drawn from Stick Style.
- The Daniel T. Pilgrim house at 1514 Church Street is a 2-story Queen Anne house built about 1885, with a cross-gabled form. The front end has angled corners, with windows decorated with jig-sawn hood moulds. The eaves on the gable-end are similarly decorated.
- The First Congregational Parsonage at 1504 Church Street was built in 1885, a 2-story building across the street from the Congregational Church. Its style is Queen Anne, with a cross-gabled roof, bay windows, and complex porches.
- The Emma C. Caswell house at 1530-32 Church Street is a 1.5-story house built in 1887, with a hip-roofed porch across its front, and the front gable decorated with board and batten.
- The L.T. Lehmann house at 1630 Church Street is a 2.5-story Queen Anne built about 1891 with a 3-story corner tower roofed with a bell-like dome. It is decorated with shingles in the gable ends, a band of shingles between the first and second floors, and fine spindle-work in the porch.
- The John B. DeSwarte house at 1622 Church Street is a 1.5-story eclectic-styled house built in 1891. The bay windows, exposed chimney, and shingled gables are clearly Queen Anne style. The pitch of some roof surfaces, the little shed-roofed dormer, and the gambrel roof could be drawn from Shingle style.
- The Ferdinand Bark house at 1612 Church Street is a 2-story Queen Anne home built in 1893, with a cross-gabled roof, and cutaway corners on the first floor. Fish-scale shingles decorate the gable ends.
- The August C.O. Peter house at 1621 Church Street is a 2.5-story Colonial Revival house built about 1914. Typical of the style, the front is symmetric around the main entrance, which is a porch roof supported by two Tuscan columns. On one end is a screened porch with a rooftop balustrade above.
- The First Congregational Church's current building is a Georgian Revival building designed by member Edwin O. Kuenzli and built in 1919. Kuenzli drew inspiration from the 1793 Congregational Church in Williamstown, Massachusetts. Like most Georgian Revival buildings, walls are of red brick, trimmed in white. The front entrance is through a pedimented portico supported by four 2-story Doric columns. Above that a large white belfry/steeple/spire rises three stories. This is the congregation that built a church on this site in 1853, giving Church Street its name.
- The Nathan Fronk house at 1448 Church Street is a 1.5-story cream brick home built about 1920 in Spanish Colonial Revival style, indicated by the rounded parapets on the gable ends. A garage in a matching style is behind the house.
- The George B. Nase house, at 7758 W. Menomonee River Parkway, is a 1-story Prairie Style home designed by Russell Barr Williamson and built about 1920. Typical features of the style are the general horizontal lines, hip roof, broad eaves, stucco exterior, and the ribbons of casement windows. Behind the house is a matching garage.
