= Rufus Arndt House =

Historic house in Wisconsin, United States

- U.S. National Register of Historic Places
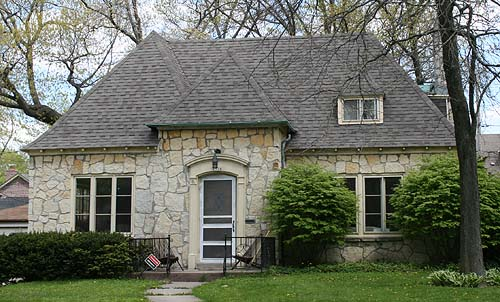

- Location within Wisconsin Location within the United States
- Location: 4524 N. Cramer St., Whitefish Bay, Wisconsin
- Coordinates: 43°5′55″N 87°53′9″W
- Area: less than one acre
- Built: 1925
- Architect: Ernest Flagg; Arnold F. Meyer & Co.
- Architectural style: Cotswold Cottage
- MPS: Ernest Flagg Stone Masonry Houses of Milwaukee County TR
- NRHP reference No.: 85002016
- Added to NRHP: September 12, 1985

The Rufus Arndt House in Whitefish Bay, Wisconsin, United States, was built in 1925. It was designed by Ernest Flagg in a style that suggests Tudor Revival and Cotswold Cottage and built by the Arnold F. Meyer & Co. One of the Ernest Flagg Stone Masonry Houses of Milwaukee County, this residence was listed on the National Register of Historic Places on September 12, 1985.

Ernest Flagg was a New York architect known primarily for his grand designs of New York's 47-story Singer Tower, which was the tallest office building in the world when built in 1908, for buildings at the U.S. Naval Academy, and for the Corcoran Gallery of Art in Washington, D.C. But Flagg was also interested in producing tasteful, inexpensive homes that the middle class could afford. Toward this end, he designed a system of standardized parts and innovative techniques which could be used to build various house configurations. Common elements include walls of natural stone and concrete poured in wooden forms which could be built even by unskilled workers, no basements, concrete floors, steeply sloped roofs to provide storage space, ridge dormers to provide summer ventilation and light, round-capped chimneys, lack of interior halls to save space, thin interior walls of plastered screen to save space, and standardized fixtures.

The Arndt house is one of five of these "Flagg system" homes in its neighbourhood.
