= Thomas B. Hart House =

Historic house in Wisconsin, United States

- U.S. National Register of Historic Places
- U.S. Historic district – Contributing property
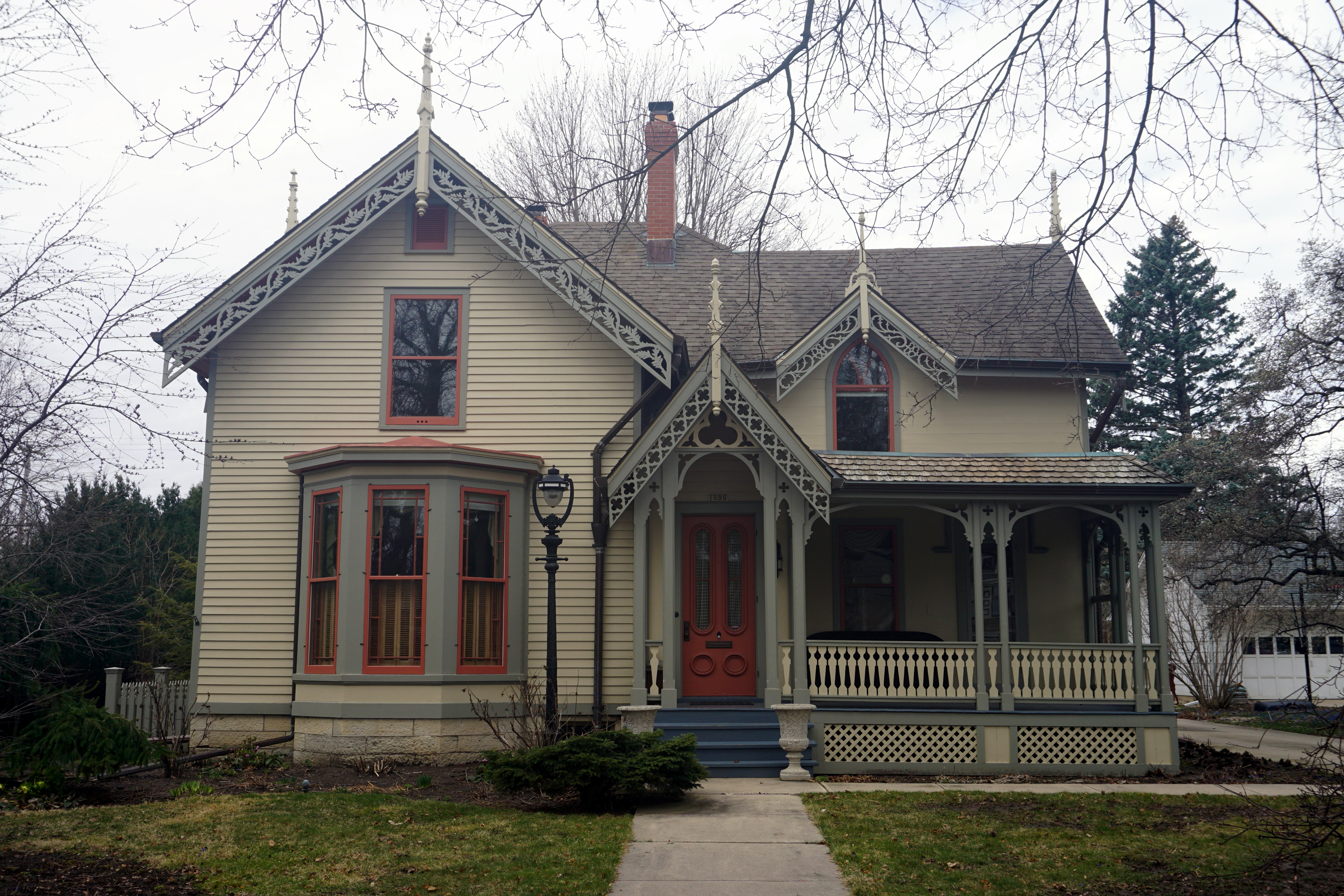

- Location within Wisconsin Location within the United States
- Interactive map showing the location of Thomas B. Hart House
- Location: 1609 Church St. Wauwatosa, Wisconsin
- Coordinates: 44°3′6″N 88°0′37″W
- Area: less than one acre
- Built: Early 1840s
- Architectural style: Gothic Revival
- Part of: Church Street Historic District (ID89001099)
- NRHP reference No.: 85003135
- Added to NRHP: October 10, 1985

The Thomas B. Hart House is a Gothic Revival-styled house built in the 1840s in Wauwatosa, Wisconsin. Its most distinctive feature is the many elaborate bargeboards decorated with various patterns. It was added to the National Register of Historic Places in 1985, and is today one of Wauwatosa's oldest surviving houses. It is currently a private residence.

== History ==
Wauwatosa was once called "Hart's Mills," named for Charles Hart, who built a grist mill there in 1837 with financing from his brother Thomas back east. This house bears Thomas's name, but it wasn't associated with him until thirty years after it was built.

The house was probably built in the early 1840s, shortly after Hart's Mills was founded. The builder is unknown and the first occupant is uncertain, but it may have been Perley J. Shumway, a blacksmith who also owned a tavern called the Wauwatosa House, which may have been part of the Underground Railroad. Shumway was active in politics and was elected to Wisconsin's State Assembly in 1848. In 1856 he sold the house to Cortland D. Rose.

In 1874, after a few more changes of ownership, Thomas B. Hart bought the house. Thomas had joined his brother in Hart's Mills early on, helping to operate the grist mill, dealing in real estate, and serving on the first town board of supervisors in 1837. Thomas and his son T.W. owned the house until around 1912.

Later Dr. Stanley J. Seeger bought the house. He was Chief of Staff at Columbia Hospital and Children's Hospital, a nationally acclaimed surgeon, and a pioneer in burn treatment. In 1937 the Hemps bought the house and divided it into apartments. In 1982 Roy and Mary Jo Cole bought the house, and began restoring it.

The house was originally smaller than now, two stories with a T-shaped foot-print. Over the years, many additions have been made. (The NRHP nomination among the references below contains an educated guess at how the floorplan grew over the years.) As of a 1912 photograph, the front facade looked much like today. The bay window, the lancet-arched windows, and the style of the porch are all hallmarks of Gothic Revival style, as are the bargeboards. The elaborate bargeboards decorating the gable ends are the striking feature of the house, displaying several designs. The board over the front door and several other gables have a quatrefoil design cut with a scroll saw. On the south gable the board is an oakleaf pattern. On the southeast gable is a trefoil floral pattern. The "barn" behind the house is decorated with a board with a simple scroll design. But the NRHP nomination says that of the bargeboards, "[t]he most spectacular is over the lancet arched window. It is a hand-carved, delicately rounded, lacey scroll."

The Hart house is the oldest house on the earliest residential street in Wauwatosa. It is located within the Church Street Historic District.
