= Hales Corners, Wisconsin =

- Village
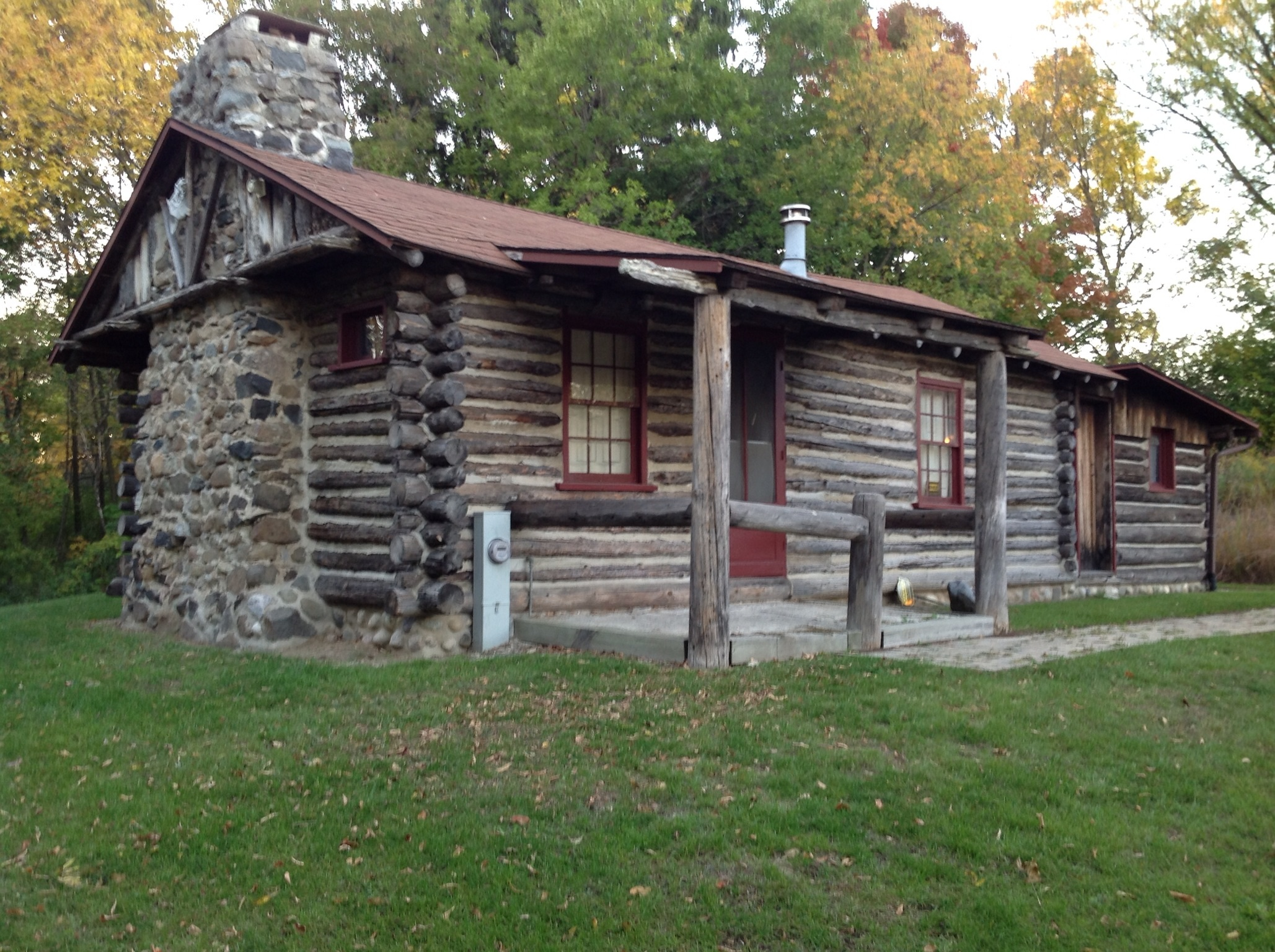
- W. Ben Hunt Cabin

- Location of Hales Corners in Milwaukee County, Wisconsin.
- Coordinates: 42°56′29″N 88°3′4″W
- Country: United States
- State: Wisconsin
- County: Milwaukee
- Founded: 1837
- Incorporated: 1952

Area
  - Total: 3.20 sq mi (8.28 km^{2})
  - Land: 3.19 sq mi (8.27 km^{2})
  - Water: 0.0077 sq mi (0.02 km^{2})
- Elevation: 781 ft (238 m)

Population (2020)
  - Total: 7,720
  - Density: 2,370.8/sq mi (915.37/km^{2})
- Time zone: UTC-6 (Central (CST))
  - Summer (DST): UTC-5 (CDT)
- ZIP Code: 53130, 53131, 53132
- Area code: 414
- FIPS code: 55-32075
- GNIS feature ID: 1565971
- Website: halescornerswi.gov

Hales Corners is a village in Milwaukee County, Wisconsin, United States. The population was 7,720 at the 2020 census. A suburb of Milwaukee, it is part of the Milwaukee metropolitan area.

== History ==
The land in the area that would eventually encompass the Village was first claimed as French, then British, and eventually as the Northwest Territory of the United States in 1783. It was the land of the Potawatomi Indians until they were forced to move from their land in 1838. They were the dominant tribe in southeast Wisconsin with large villages. Like the Europeans that arrived later, they planted crops, but theirs were beans, squash, and corn. By engaging in the fur trade, the Potawatomi learned to speak French and English, and they eventually intermarried with the Europeans. During the 1830s and 1840s, more settlers arrived, starting with a number of New England families. Among them were three Hale families, whose lineage has been charted to England in the 1200s.

Hales Corners traces its history back to 1837, when brothers Seneca and William Hale each laid claim to 160 acres of land at the site. Their father, Ebenezer Hale, arrived later and purchased another 160 acres. The three Hales at that time owned three of the four corners at the intersection of the roads now known as Janesville Road and 108th Street (Wisconsin Highway 100). The area was first referred to as "Hale's Corners" in reference to William Hale, who had become the first postmaster at the settlement in 1854. The apostrophe was later dropped.

Hales Corners was the site of monthly fairs begun in the mid-1800s, when the plank road between Janesville and Milwaukee passed through the village. First a gathering of horse traders, the fairs became a stock market for farmers trading pigs, cattle, and sheep.

The settlement was incorporated as a village on January 30, 1952.

== Geography ==
Hales Corners is located in southwestern Milwaukee County. It is bounded by Greenfield on the north, Greendale on the east, Franklin on the south, and New Berlin and Muskego in Waukesha County on the west.

According to the United States Census Bureau, the village has a total area of 3.22 square miles (8.34 km^{2}), of which 3.21 square miles (8.31 km^{2}) is land and 0.01 square miles (0.03 km^{2}) is water. The mean elevation is 781 feet (238 m).

== Demographics ==
Historical population
Census	Pop.	Note	%±
1960	5,549		—
1970	7,771		40.0%
1980	7,110		−8.5%
1990	7,623		7.2%
2000	7,765		1.9%
2010	7,692		−0.9%
2020	7,720		0.4%
U.S. Decennial Census

=== 2010 census ===
As of the census of 2010, there were 7,692 people, 3,301 households, and 2,066 families living in the village. The population density was 2,396.3 inhabitants per square mile (925.2/km^{2}). There were 3,505 housing units at an average density of 1,091.9 per square mile (421.6/km^{2}). The racial makeup of the village was 94.7% White, 1.0% African American, 0.5% Native American, 1.7% Asian, 0.9% from other races, and 1.2% from two or more races. Hispanic or Latino of any race were 4.3% of the population.

There were 3,301 households, of which 27.3% had children under the age of 18 living with them, 49.1% were married couples living together, 9.8% had a female householder with no husband present, 3.6% had a male householder with no wife present, and 37.4% were non-families. 31.6% of all households were made up of individuals, and 14.6% had someone living alone who was 65 years of age or older. The average household size was 2.31 and the average family size was 2.91.

The median age in the village was 43.9 years. 20.8% of residents were under the age of 18; 8.2% were between the ages of 18 and 24; 22.6% were from 25 to 44; 29.9% were from 45 to 64; and 18.5% were 65 years of age or older. The gender makeup of the village was 47.6% male and 52.4% female.

=== 2000 census ===
As of the census of 2000, there were 7,765 people, 3,260 households, and 2,122 families living in the village. The population density was 2,424.7 people per square mile (936.9/km^{2}). There were 3,377 housing units at an average density of 1,054.5 per square mile (407.5/km^{2}). The racial makeup of the village was 97.15% White, 0.22% African American, 0.49% Native American, 0.97% Asian, 0.04% Pacific Islander, 0.57% from other races, and 0.57% from two or more races. Hispanic or Latino of any race were 2.09% of the population.

There were 3,260 households, out of which 27.4% had children under the age of 18 living with them, 53.8% were married couples living together, 8.5% had a female householder with no husband present, and 34.9% were non-families. 29.1% of all households were made up of individuals, and 12.6% had someone living alone who was 65 years of age or older. The average household size was 2.35 and the average family size was 2.93.

In the village, the population was spread out, with 22.1% under the age of 18, 7.2% from 18 to 24, 28.1% from 25 to 44, 24.2% from 45 to 64, and 18.5% who were 65 years of age or older. The median age was 41 years. For every 100 females, there were 91.1 males. For every 100 females age 18 and over, there were 87.9 males.

The median income for a household in the village was $54,536, and the median income for a family was $66,136. Males had a median income of $42,175 versus $33,237 for females. The per capita income for the village was $25,354. About 0.3% of families and 2.0% of the population were below the poverty line, including 0.6% of those under age 18 and 5.0% of those age 65 or over.

== Education ==
The Whitnall School District serves Hales Corners.

- Edgerton Elementary School
- Hales Corners Elementary School

Private schools:

- Hales Corners Lutheran School
- Messiah Lutheran School
- St. Mary Parish School

Post-secondary:

- Sacred Heart School of Theology

== Points of interest ==
- Boerner Botanical Gardens
- Audacy Milwaukee studios (WMYX, WSSP and WXSS)
- Hales Corners Chamber of Commerce
- Hales Corners Historical Society (including W. Ben Hunt Cabin)
- Hales Corners Library
- Hales Corners Lutheran Church
- St. Mary Catholic Church
- Hales Corners Speedway

== Notable people ==
- Zeke Dombrowski, soccer player
- Alyson Dudek, two-time Olympian 2010 (bronze medal) and 2014 short track speed skater
- W. Ben Hunt (1888–1970) educator and author
- Gordon Gano, frontman of the rock band Violent Femmes
- Jim Gantner, MLB player for the Milwaukee Brewers
- Barbara Lawton, Lieutenant Governor of Wisconsin
- Paul and Tom Poberezny, former heads of the Experimental Aircraft Association and members of the National Aviation Hall of Fame
- Roy Reiman, founder of Reiman Publications
- James A. Rutkowski, Wisconsin State Representative
- Bill Schroeder, catcher for the Brewers and California Angels.
- Wilfred Schuele, Wisconsin State Senator

== See also ==
- List of villages in Wisconsin
