= Juneau Highlands Residential Historic District =

Historic district in Wisconsin, United States

- U.S. National Register of Historic Places
- U.S. Historic district
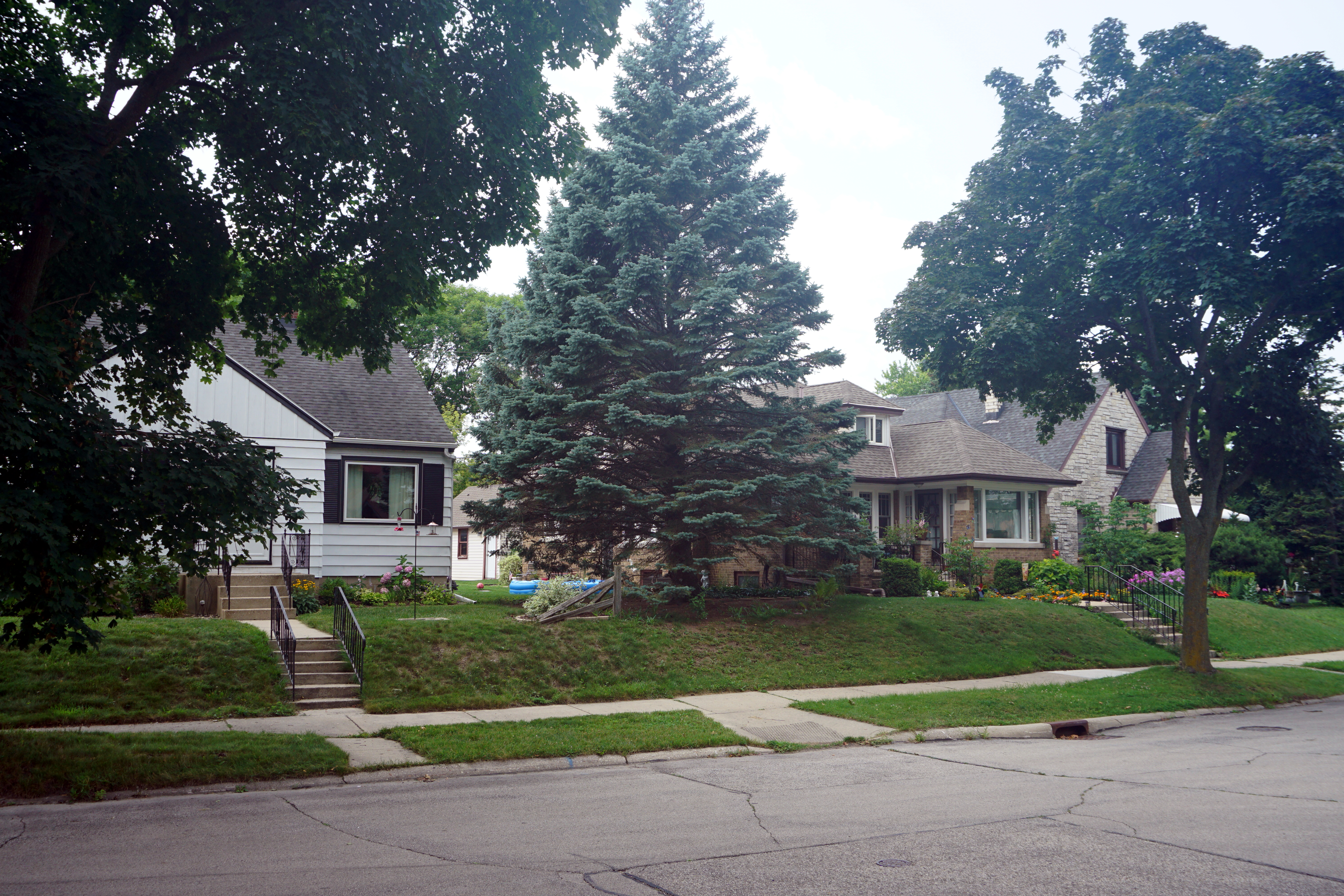
- Juneau Highlands Residential Historic District
- Location: West Allis, Wisconsin
- NRHP reference No.: 11000116
- Added to NRHP: March 21, 2011

The Juneau Highlands Residential Historic District is a historic neighborhood in West Allis, Wisconsin, with contributing homes built from 1928 to 1952. It was added to the National Register of Historic Places in 2011.

== History ==
The neighborhood was built after the industrial boom following the move of what would become Allis-Chalmers to West Allis, with contributing homes built from 1928 to 1952. Contributing homes include, roughly in the order built:

- The Lajsich home at 2151 S. Livingston Terrace is a 1928 bungalow with hip roof.
- The Hundly house at 2133 S. Livingston Terrace is a hip-roofed brick-clad bungalow built in 1928.
- The Galle house at 2169 S. Livingston Terrace is another 1928 bungalow, this one with clipped gables and probably built by Val. Nitzsche Jr.
- The Sternberger house at 2180 S. Livingston Terrace is another 1.5-story bungalow with clipped gables built in 1928, this one by Walter Zielinski.
- The Waisanen duplex at 6627-6629 W. Revere Place is a 1.5-story brick-clad bungalow with clipped gables, built in 1929.
- The Pfeiffer house at 2164 S. Livingston Terrace is a 1.5-story home designed by David Conrad Co. in Tudor Revival style and built in 1929.
- The Cielichowski house at 6616 W. Revere Place is a 1.5-story Tudor Revival home built in 1929, probably by Solomon Gaviser.
- The Whittemore home at 6608 W. Grant Street is a 1.5-story bungalow with clipped gables, built in 1929.
- The Holberg house at 2163 S. Livingston Drive is another bungalow with clipped gables, built in 1929 by H,. Gersonde & Sons.
- The Brandon home at 2150 S. Livingston Terrace is a Colonial Revival-styled home built by H. Gersonde & Sons in 1929.
- The Selan home at 6622 W. Revere Place is a bungalow/Tudor Revival hybrid built by Anton J. Berres in 1929.
- The Schwinn house at 6612 W. Grant Street is a brick-clad Mediterranean Revival-styled house built in 1929 by Miswald Construction.
- The Janowski home at 6625 W. Grant Street is a 2.5-story Tudor Revival home designed by Erdman & Zahn and built in 1931.
- The Roska house at 6705 W. Grant Street is a 1.5-story stone-clad Tudor Revival house built in 1932 by Roth & Taplin.
- The Jacobs house at 2138 S. Livingston Terrace was designed by George A. Kemnitz in French Provincial style and built in 1932.
- The Huber house at 6726 W. Grant Street is a 1.5-story stone-clad Tudor Revival home built in 1935 by Roth and Taplin.
- The Rupnik house at 6626 W. Revere Place is another bungalow, built by Roth & Taplin in 1936.
- The Buchen house at 2146 S. Livingston Terrace is a 1.5-story stone-clad bungalow built by H.P. Schroeder in 1941.
- The Dwyer-McMicken duplex at 6600-6602 W. Grant Street is 2-story brick-clad cube with a hip roof, built by the Dwyer-McMicken Building Company in 1944.
- The Sundberg duplex at 6642-6644 Revere Place is a 2-story brick-clad duplex built in 1952. Its brickwork at the corners suggests quoins.

The neighborhood stands out for its curving streets, which contrast with the rectangular grid of the rest of the city.

Most of the houses are in the period revival styles of the 1920s and 30s. None of the earlier architectural styles are present: no Gothic Revival, no Queen Anne, and not even a Prairie style house. Their complete absence in the district illustrates how rigidly residential architectural styles follow fashion.
