= Painesville Chapel =

- U.S. National Register of Historic Places
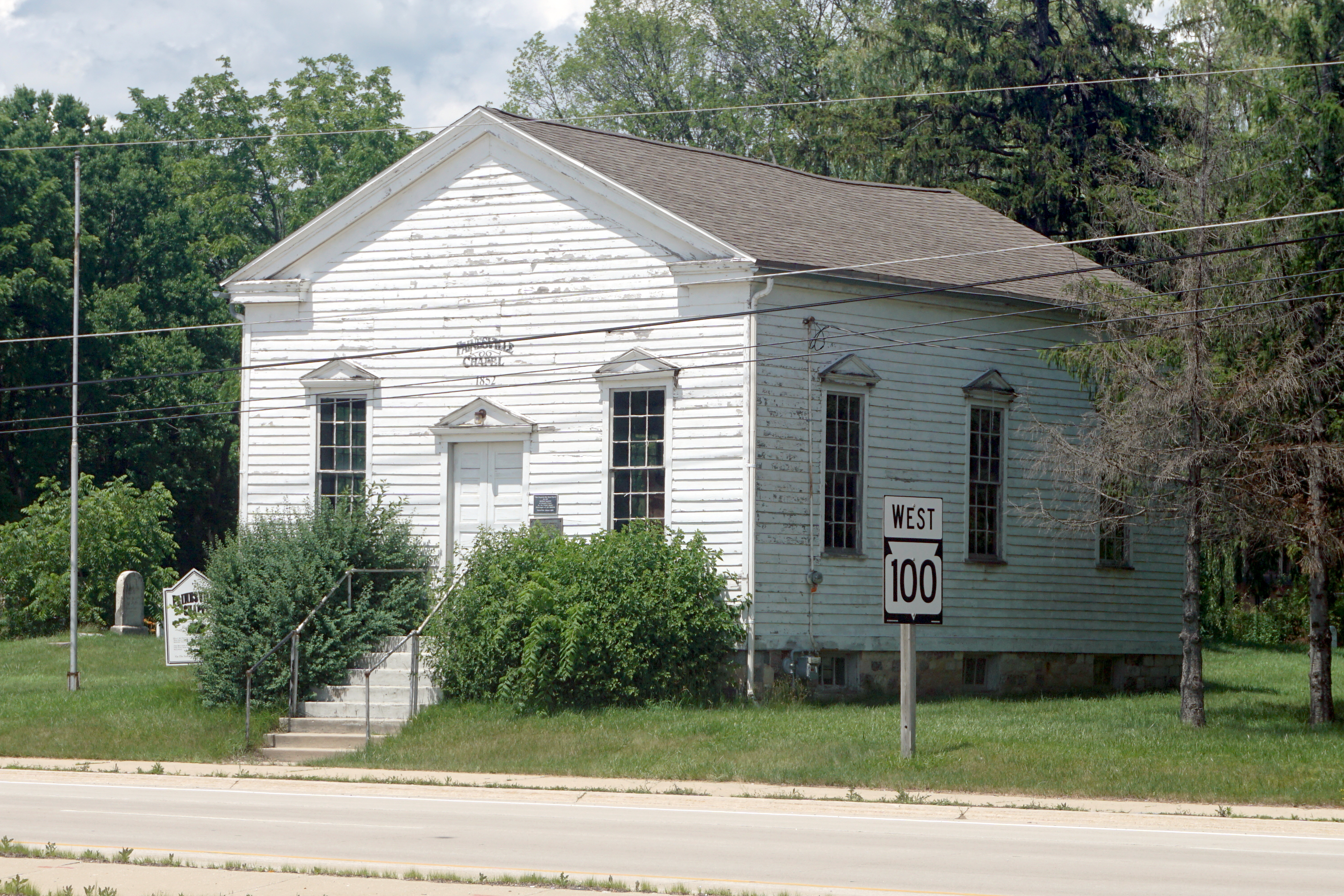
- Painesville Chapel
- Location: 2740 W. Ryan Rd. Franklin, Milwaukee County, Wisconsin
- Coordinates: 42.87287°N 87.95216°W
- Architect: Henry Roethe
- NRHP reference No.: 77000039
- Added to NRHP: November 7, 1977

The Painesville Chapel is a historic meeting hall built in 1852 by German immigrant Freethinkers in Franklin, Milwaukee County, Wisconsin. It was added to the National Register of Historic Places in 1977.

In the 1830s and 40s, immigrants from Wittenberg, Germany were among the settlers near Franklin. They attended St. John's Lutheran in Oak Creek until 1851, when a dispute over doctrine caused the congregation to split, with half following Pastor Carl Gustav Rausch to form a Freie Gemeinde, a Free Congregation, whose priorities were independence of the congregation and freedom of thought for individuals. The congregation as a whole endorsed no creed, and members included Christians, agnostics and atheists. This paralleled similar splits back in Germany at that time. This Free Congregation at Franklin initially numbered 35 members, and met in a log school a half mile south of Ryan Road. They were the first of thirty such Free Congregations in Wisconsin.

In 1851 the congregation hired carpenter Henry Roethe to construct the modest building pictured, one story with clapboard siding, originally sitting on four large fieldstones. The style is simple Greek Revival, with returns on the eaves and small pediments on the doors and windows. Inside stand the original pews, pulpit, and stove. On the walls hang portraits of Benjamin Franklin, Alexander Humboldt, and Thomas Paine, just as described in a report from 1876. The building sits in a one-acre cemetery, where lie many original members of the congregation.

At formation, the congregation called itself "The First Free Christian Church of the town of Franklin and Oak Creek," but many of the members admired Thomas Paine for his early writings on free thought, and the meeting place soon became commonly known as the "Painesville Chapel" or "Painesville Cemetery Chapel."

Rausch left in 1853, leaving Free Thought to again become a Lutheran pastor. The next speaker was Robert Glatz, a former German priest. After he died in 1856, German immigrant and farmer Christian Schroeter became the speaker, and guided the group for years. The congregation numbered 37 in 1876, and activities included biweekly lectures at 10:00 on Sunday morning, a singing society, and circulation of literature like the Freidenker, Truth Seeker, and pamphlets of Karl Heinzen. After Schroeter's passing in 1890, the congregation shrank. They stopped holding meetings in 1905. By 1935 the chapel sat in poor condition, with a leaking roof, broken windows, and birds nesting inside.

In 1936 Alexander Guth assessed the building for the Historic American Buildings Survey, and was impressed. He wrote: "I therefore ascribe this cemetery chapel as one of the outstanding buildings that I have found in my entire years of study of these older structures. The building, together with its unusual setting... of age old spruce trees and burial ground, represents a typical heritage of the past. A veritable bit of New England transplanted to Wisconsin, the building is the embodiment of the best spirit of the colonial type of architecture..." Guth's enthusiasm invigorated the descendants of the chapel's founders. They put a basement under the building, rebuilt the fieldstone foundation, restored the roof, siding and windows, and added the front stairs and electricity. Other than that, they preserved the building very much as built.

Today the chapel is maintained by the Painesville Memorial Association, which meets in the building. Only one Freethinkers Society remains active in Wisconsin: the Freethinkers' Hall at Sauk City.
