= Alexander Herschel and Pauline G. McMicken House =

Historic house in West Allis, Wisconsin

- U.S. National Register of Historic Places
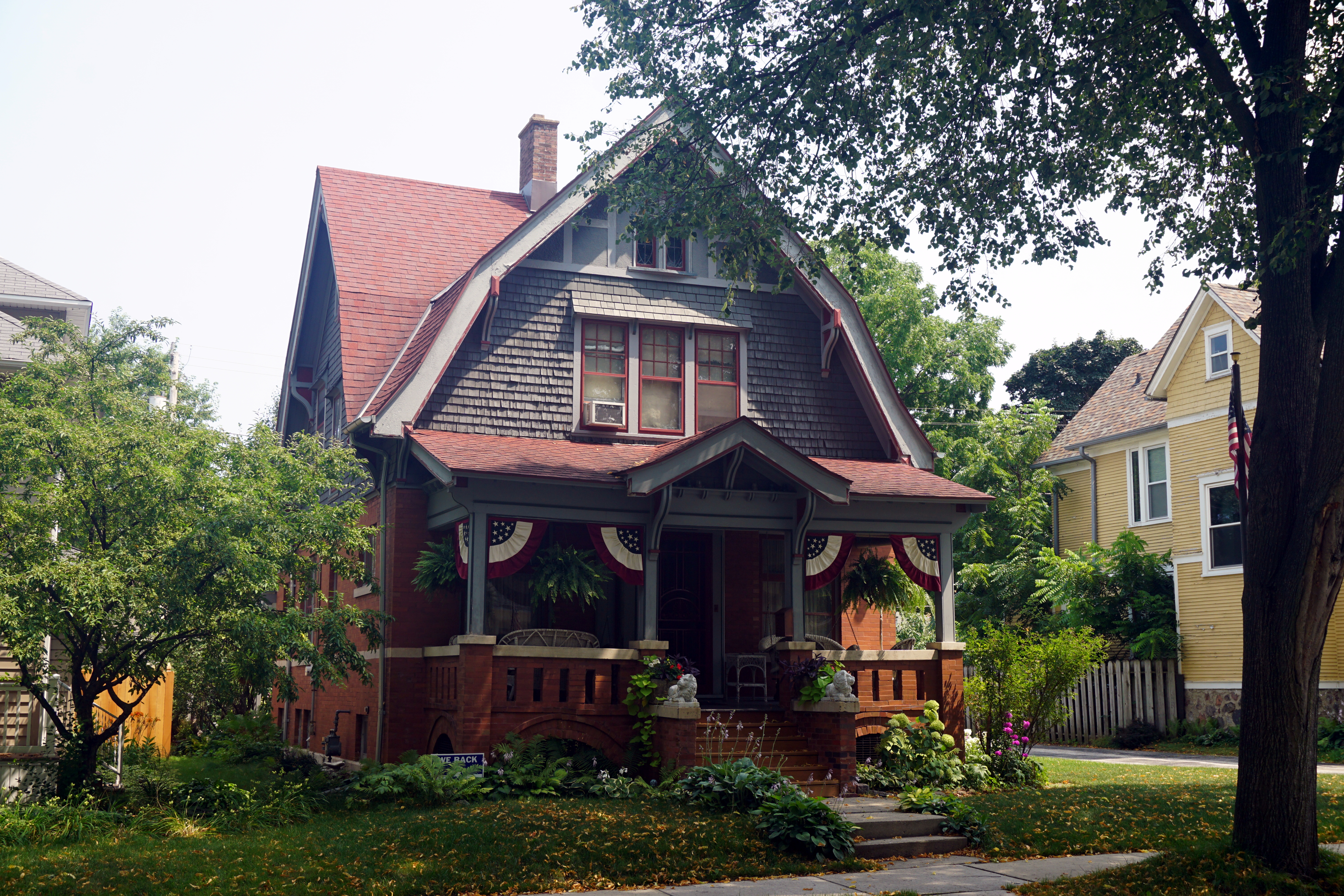
- Location: 1508 S. 80th St. West Allis, Wisconsin
- Coordinates: 43.01466°N 88.01161°W
- Built: 1909
- Architectural style: Dutch Colonial Revival/American Craftsman
- NRHP reference No.: 10000816
- Added to NRHP: October 8, 2010

The Alexander Herschel and Pauline G. McMicken House is a Dutch Colonial Revival/Craftsman-styled house built in 1909 in West Allis, Wisconsin, United States. It was added to the National Register of Historic Places in 2010.

== History ==
In 1900, Alexander McMicken left his job at a furniture store in Milwaukee to join the Central Improvement Company, which had been formed to develop the land west of Milwaukee to which the A.P Allis Company was moving its factory. He drew the first known map of West Allis in 1903 and became the general manager of CIC in 1905. In 1909, he married Pauline Mohr and they moved to the house which is the subject of this article.

The house's form is termed Dutch Colonial Revival because of the gambrel roof. The lower walls are red brick, while the upper walls are clad in wood shingles. The gable ends have broad bargeboards and the eaves are supported by ornate brackets. These embellishments suggest Craftsman style, but there is also a feel of Shingle style in those gable ends, and perhaps even a hint of Chinese architecture in the curves of the front porch.

Pauline died in 1948. Alexander remained in the house until his death in 1951.
