= Fox Point, Wisconsin =

Village in Milwaukee County, Wisconsin

- Village
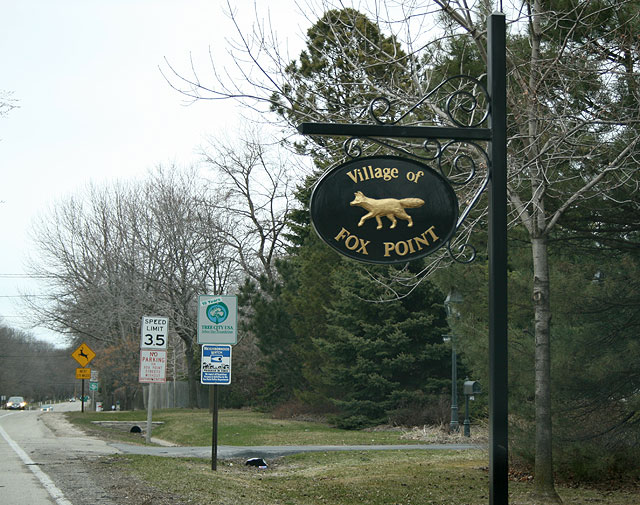
- Village entrance

- Location of Fox Point in Milwaukee County, Wisconsin.
- Coordinates: 43°9′37″N 87°54′14″W
- Country: United States
- State: Wisconsin
- County: Milwaukee
- Incorporated: 1926

Area
  - Total: 2.86 sq mi (7.41 km^{2})
  - Land: 2.86 sq mi (7.41 km^{2})
  - Water: 0 sq mi (0.00 km^{2})
- Elevation: 686 ft (209 m)

Population (2020)
  - Total: 6,934
  - Density: 2,420/sq mi (936/km^{2})
- Time zone: UTC-6 (Central (CST))
  - Summer (DST): UTC-5 (CDT)
- Postal code: 53217
- Area code: 414
- FIPS code: 55-27075
- GNIS feature ID: 1565227
- Website: villageoffoxpoint.com

Fox Point is a village in Milwaukee County, Wisconsin, United States. The population was 6,934 at the 2020 census.

Located on the western shore of Lake Michigan, Fox Point is one of the North Shore suburbs of the Milwaukee metropolitan area. The village is primarily residential. Shopping centers include Fox Point Shops, and RiverPoint Shopping Center.

== History ==
The Fox Point area has been inhabited for thousands of years. The earliest known inhabitants were Woodland period Mound Builders, who constructed earthen effigy and burial mounds in the area. Many of the mounds were destroyed by white farmers between 1850 and 1920. In the early 19th century, archaeologists also found traces of several Hopewell villages in the area.

The land was opened to European and American settlers in the 1830s, after the Potawatomi signed the 1833 Treaty of Chicago. The first survey of the area was conducted later that year, and the U.S. Federal Government began land parcels in present-day Fox Point in autumn 1835. Surveyors in the mid-nineteenth century noted a point that resembled a fox's snout jutting into Lake Michigan at the present location of Doctor's Park in the village. They originally called it "Foxes Point" before residents eventually shortened it to "Fox Point."

The land was organized as part of the Town of Milwaukee in 1835, and much of the land was bought by land speculators, who cleared the old-growth forests for timber. The first permanent settler in the area was Cephas Buttles, who owned 160 acres in the Town of Milwaukee and built a cabin in present-day River Hills in 1843. In the mid-1840s, many families of Dutch settlers began arriving in the Town of Milwaukee. John Cappon was the first Dutch settler in Fox Point, building his cabin in 1846. By 1855, more than 20 Dutch families lived in Fox Point. The early settlers farmed the land with new techniques that allowed them to cultivate wheat, barley, rye, and corn in the clayey soil. In 1848, they built a one one-room schoolhouses and another two in 1852, including the Old Dutch Schoolhouse Site and Burial Ground, which is a Milwaukee County landmark. Two Dutch Reformed congregations formed in the community in its early years. The community's demographics changed later in the nineteenth century. One of Fox Point's first black residents was Calvin Reeves, a formerly enslaved man from Louisiana who moved to the community after the American Civil War with two Dutch-American soldiers returning home from the conflict. German immigrants also began moving to Fox Point in the 1860s, forming St. John's Lutheran Church in 1866.

Fox Point changed significantly in the 1890s. Many of the originally Dutch farmers had moved to the City of Milwaukee and to the southern Sheboygan County Town of Holland, and the villages of Oostburg and Cedar Grove. By 1898, the Dutch churches had disbanded. But at the same time, wealthy Milwaukeeans were building summer homes in the lakeside community, which was easily accessible via the Lakeshore & Western Railroad constructed in 1870 and later via the Milwaukee Electric Railway and Light Company streetcars. In 1898, the Fox Point Club—the state's second golf course—opened in the community, and attracted even more wealthy residents to the area, serving as a social center.

The rural Town of Milwaukee did not provide electricity, running water, sewage, or garbage collection, and by the 1920s, Fox Point's increasingly wealthy residents wanted a higher standard of municipal service. Fox Point incorporated as a village in 1926, formed a school district in 1927, and began creating municipal parks, including Doctors Park on the Lake Michigan shore, which opened in 1930 and was transferred to the Milwaukee County parks system in 1937.

Although the late 1920s saw a short-lived building boom before the Great Depression, the population remained in the hundreds through World War II. But the village dramatically grew during the post-war boom with the population increasing from 1,180 in 1940 to 7,939 in 1970, a nearly seven-fold increase. The village also gained territory in 1954, when Bayside, Fox Point, Glendale, and River Hills agreed to annex what remained of the Town of Milwaukee to prevent the City of Milwaukee from expanding across northeastern Milwaukee County.

== Geography ==
According to the United States Census Bureau, the village has a total area of 2.90 square miles (7.51 km^{2}), all land.

=== Climate ===
Fox Point, situated within the humid continental climate zone (Köppen prefix D), experiences distinct seasonal variation, with wide swings in temperature and precipitation. The village's immediate proximity to Lake Michigan makes it susceptible to lake-effect snow in the winter months.

The warmest month of the year in Fox Point is July, with a high temperature average of 84 °F (28.9 °C) and low temperatures of 64 °F (17.8 °C). The summer months are the wettest months of the year, with frequent thunderstorms in the region. January is the coldest month, with average high temperatures averaging only 30 °F (-1.1 °C), and lows averaging 14 °F (-10 °C). February is the driest month.

Climate data for Mequon, Wisconsin
Month	Jan	Feb	Mar	Apr	May	Jun	Jul	Aug	Sep	Oct	Nov	Dec	Year
Mean daily maximum °F (°C)	30 (−1)	34 (1)	45 (7)	58 (14)	69 (21)	79 (26)	84 (29)	81 (27)	74 (23)	61 (16)	47 (8)	34 (1)	58 (14)
Mean daily minimum °F (°C)	14 (−10)	17 (−8)	26 (−3)	37 (3)	48 (9)	58 (14)	64 (18)	62 (17)	53 (12)	41 (5)	30 (−1)	19 (−7)	39 (4)
Average precipitation inches (mm)	1.38 (35)	1.35 (34)	1.62 (41)	3.36 (85)	3.29 (84)	4.04 (103)	3.70 (94)	3.74 (95)	3.20 (81)	2.31 (59)	2.35 (60)	1.55 (39)	31.89 (810)
Source: The Weather Channel

== Demographics ==
Historical population
Census	Pop.	Note	%±
1930	474		—
1940	1,180		148.9%
1950	2,585		119.1%
1960	7,315		183.0%
1970	7,939		8.5%
1980	7,649		−3.7%
1990	7,238		−5.4%
2000	7,012		−3.1%
2010	6,701		−4.4%
2020	6,934		3.5%
U.S. Decennial Census

=== 2010 census ===
As of the census of 2010, there were 6,701 people, 2,747 households, and 1,859 families residing in the village. The population density was 2,310.7 inhabitants per square mile (892.2/km^{2}). There were 2,928 housing units at an average density of 1,009.7 per square mile (389.8/km^{2}). The racial makeup of the village was 91.5% White, 2.8% African American, 0.1% Native American, 3.7% Asian, 0.4% from other races, and 1.4% from two or more races. Hispanic or Latino of any race were 2.4% of the population.

There were 2,747 households, of which 29.7% had children under the age of 18 living with them, 60.5% were married couples living together, 5.1% had a female householder with no husband present, 2.0% had a male householder with no wife present, and 32.3% were non-families. 28.4% of all households were made up of individuals, and 14% had someone living alone who was 65 years of age or older. The average household size was 2.36 and the average family size was 2.92.

The median age in the village was 45.6 years. 22.8% of residents were under the age of 18; 7% were between the ages of 18 and 24; 19.4% were from 25 to 44; 32.4% were from 45 to 64; and 18.4% were 65 years of age or older. The gender makeup of the village was 49.0% male and 51.0% female.

=== 2000 census ===
As of the census of 2000, there were 7,012 people, 2,825 households, and 1,988 families residing in the village. The population density was 2,399 people per square mile (927.2/km^{2}). There were 2,910 housing units at an average density of 995.7 per square mile (384.8/km^{2}). The racial makeup of the village was 95.55% White, 1.21% African American, 0.11% Native American, 2.14% Asian, 0.01% Pacific Islander, 0.19% from other races, and 0.78% from two or more races. Hispanic or Latino of any race were 1.06% of the population.

There were 2,825 households, out of which 30.6% had children under the age of 18 living with them, 62.4% were married couples living together, 6.1% had a female householder with no husband present, and 29.6% were non-families. 27.3% of all households were made up of individuals, and 13.8% had someone living alone who was 65 years of age or older. The average household size was 2.39 and the average family size was 2.93.

In the village, the population was spread out, with 23.9% under the age of 18, 6.1% from 18 to 24, 22.9% from 25 to 44, 27.0% from 45 to 64, and 20.0% who were 65 years of age or older. The median age was 44 years. For every 100 females, there were 89.9 males. For every 100 females age 18 and over, there were 84.9 males.

The median income for a household in the village was $80,572, and the median income for a family was $94,348. Males had a median income of $77,850 versus $38,500 for females. The per capita income for the village was $48,469. About 1.8% of families and 2.8% of the population were below the poverty line, including 4.1% of those under age 18 and 3.8% of those age 65 or over.

== Arts and culture ==
=== Sites on the National Register of Historic Places ===
- The Albert and Edith Adelman House, designed by Frank Lloyd Wright.
- Mary Nohl Art Environment, containing historic folk art.

== Government ==
The government of the Village of Fox Point consists of a Village Board, and various other boards, commissions and committees. The Village operates under the Village-Manager form of government. The Board consists of six trustees and a President, who are elected to serve three-year terms. The current President is Christine Symchych, whose term will expire in 2026. The current Village Manager is Scott Botcher, who has served since 2015. The Board has three committees: a finance committee of three members, which oversees economic matters; an audit committee with three trustees and two residents who assist the finance committee; and a three-member administration committee, which oversees new village laws. Other committees, boards, and commissions include the plan commission, board of appeals, board of police commissioners, board of reviews, the building board, board of ethics, the fair housing commission, and the historic preservation committee. In Fox Point, the President also appoints a trustee and a resident to serve on the board of the North Shore Public Library.

The Village participates in several shared municipal services, including the North Shore Fire Department, North Shore Dispatch, North Shore Library, and the North Shore Health Department.

The Village is the only Moody’s Aaa rated Village in the State of Wisconsin, and has been so for 6 consecutive years.

In the Wisconsin State Senate, Fox Point is part of the 8th Senate District, held by Republican Dan Knodl, while Democrat Deb Andraca represents the village in the Wisconsin Assembly. At the federal level, Fox Point is represented in Congress by Rep. Gwen Moore, a Democrat.

== Education ==
The municipality is in the Fox Point Joint No. 2 School District (elementary) and the Nicolet Union High School District. Fox Point includes kindergarten through 8th grade, and feeds into Nicolet High School.

St. Eugene Catholic Grade School, a private Catholic school serving students from preschool through 8th grade, is also located in the village, as is Fox Point Preschool, part of Fox Point Lutheran Church, the Milwaukee Jewish Day School, the Bader Hillel Academy, and the Jewish Beginnings Lubavitch Preschool. Portions of St. Augustine Prep's campus are located within Village boundaries, though the school's official mailing address is in Glendale.

The North Shore Public Library serves the community. Its board is a multi-municipal body with representatives from Fox Point, Bayside, Glendale, and River Hills. The library is a member of the Milwaukee County Federated Library System, and it therefore serves residents from across Milwaukee County.
