= Frederick C. Bogk House =

Historic house in Wisconsin, United States

- U.S. National Register of Historic Places
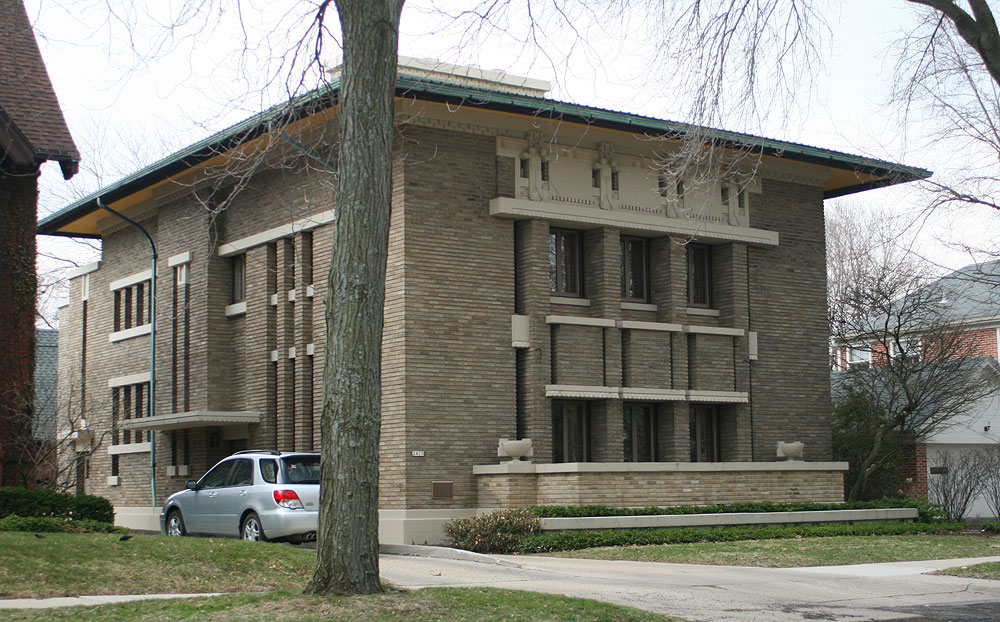

- Location within Wisconsin
- Location: 2420 N Terrace Ave, Milwaukee, WI 53211
- Coordinates: 43°03′42″N 87°52′36″W
- Built: 1917
- Architect: Frank Lloyd Wright
- Architectural style: Prairie School
- NRHP reference No.: 72000058
- Added to NRHP: October 18, 1972

The Frederick C. Bogk House is a single-family residential project in Milwaukee, Wisconsin designed by Frank Lloyd Wright. Bogk was an alderman and secretary-treasurer of the Ricketson Paint Works. This house embodies Wright's prairie style elements into a solid-looking structure that appears impregnable.

== History ==
The house was built in 1917 at a cost of $15,000. In the mid-1910s, developer Arthur Richards was readying to promote Wright's short-lived American System-Built Homes (ASBH), which were standardized home designs for moderate income housing. During this time, Wright designed several projects for Richards and his clients including the prototype ASBH Burnham Block, the Munkwitz Apartments (Milwaukee, 1916), and this residence for Frederick C. Bogk. Wright assigned Russell Williamson (Russell Barr Williamson), whom he had hired in 1914 as a draftsperson, to supervise the Munkwitz and Bogk projects. During this time, Wright's popularity was in decline, mostly due to personal troubles. The house was designed shortly after the murder of his mistress, Mamah Borthwick, and destruction of the residential wing at his home, Taliesin, and during the same period as his Imperial Hotel in Tokyo.

Robert and Barbara Elsner paid $36,000 for the house in 1955, owning it for the next seven decades. Robert Elsner wrote to ask Wright of his impression of the home and Wright replied that it was "a good house of a good period for a good client." The Elsner family decorated the house with furniture and furnishings by Wright. After Robert Elsner died in 2022, the house was sold the next year for $1.7 million.

== Design ==
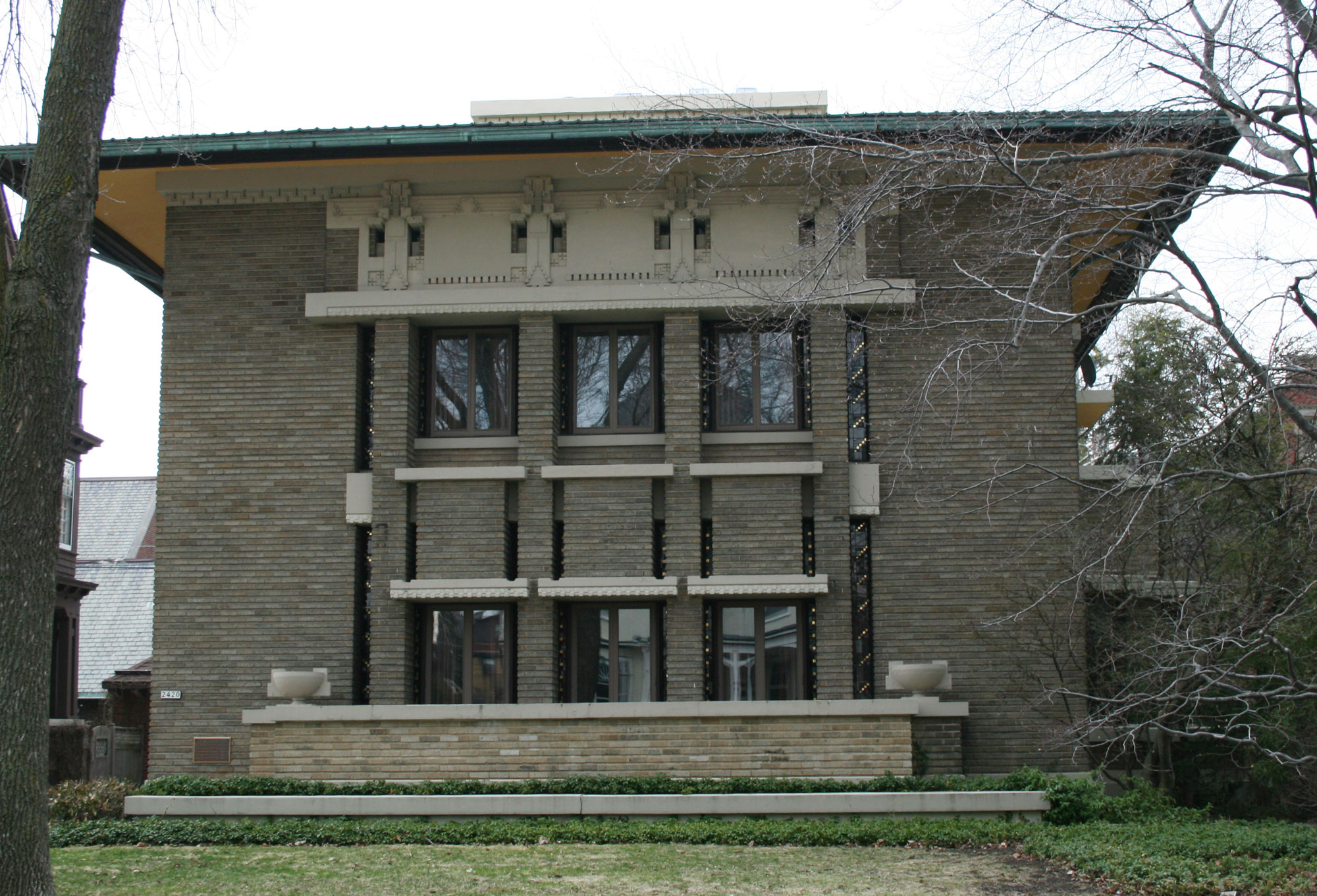
Narrow, leaded art glass can be seen alongside the windows, as well as planters beneath the second-story windows.

The facade of the Bogk house, with its buff brick columns framing leaded art glass windows, capped by decorative cast concrete under broad eaves and a low pitched hip roof suggests the influence of the Imperial Hotel in Japan, which was under construction at the time this house was built. The sophisticated balance of horizontal and vertical lines further reflects the strong Japanese influence.

The understated entrance is located at the side of the house, opening onto the driveway. The first-floor interior is a fluid succession of rooms sprawling under a low-lying ceiling. The living room extends across the front of the house, with a dining room at the right rear of the living room, up a few steps. A bedroom above the attached garage at the rear was for the maid; this extends out of the rectangular plan of the main house. There are four bedrooms and a sitting room upstairs.

Tall, narrow leaded glass windows both frame the regular windows, and appear by themselves as design elements. Similar glass panes are embedded in interior brick walls, with lights behind. There is a tiled goldfish pond against one wall of the living room, and a plaque above it with an image of cranes. Built-in light fixtures and other decorative elements are common. There is some built-in furniture, such as desks and bookshelves. The other furniture is not original to the house, but is Wright's design. The current carpeting is a reproduction of Wright's original design.

== See also ==
- National Register of Historic Places in Milwaukee
- List of Frank Lloyd Wright works
