= Anthony and Caroline Isermann House =

Historic house in Wisconsin, United States

- U.S. National Register of Historic Places
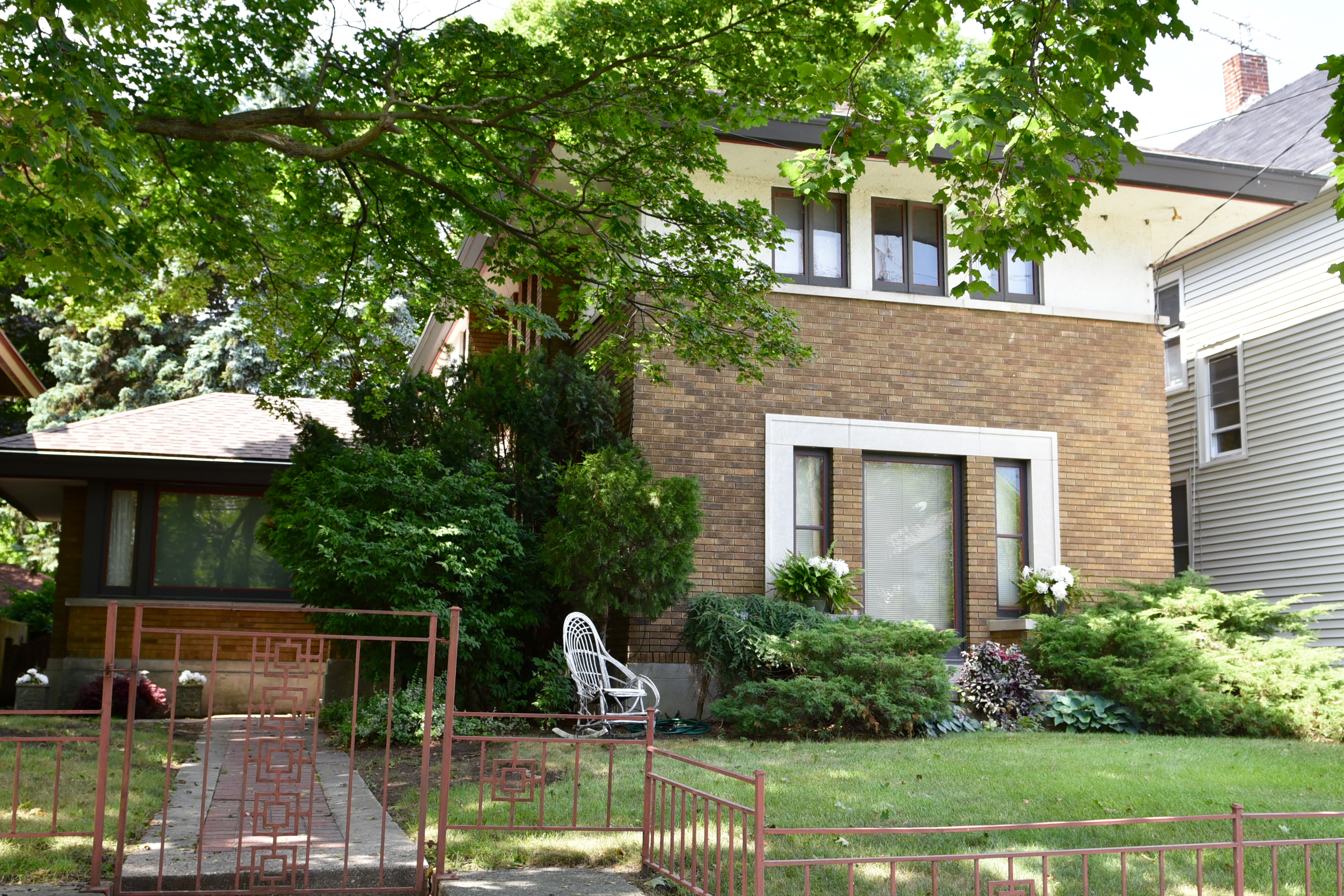
- Anthony and Caroline Isermann House

- Location within Wisconsin Location within the United States
- Location: 6416 Seventh Ave. Kenosha, Wisconsin
- Coordinates: 42°34′33″N 87°49′8″W
- Built: 1922
- Architect: Russell Barr Williamson
- Architectural style: Prairie School
- NRHP reference No.: 04000108
- Added to NRHP: February 25, 2004

The Anthony and Caroline Isermann House is located in Kenosha, Wisconsin, United States. Designed in the Prairie School by a student of Frank Lloyd Wright, it was added to the National Register of Historic Places in 2004.

== History ==
The Anthony and Caroline Isermann House was constructed in Kenosha, Wisconsin in 1922. Anthony Isermann was President of the Isermann Clothing Store in downtown Kenosha. The house was designed by Russell Barr Williamson, who worked for Frank Lloyd Wright from 1914 to 1917 as a draftsperson and site supervisor, often for projects in and around Milwaukee. The house was designed in the Prairie School style, which emphasizes horizontal lines. The home passed to Anthony and Caroline's daughter Mary and her husband James Fargo in 1955. Anthony Isermann lived in the house until the early 1960s. The house neighbors the Frank and Jane Isermann House, which belonged to Anthony's brother. The house was recognized by the National Park Service with a listing on the National Register of Historic Places on February 25, 2004.

The house has many features typical of the Prairie School. It has overhanging eaves under a low-pitched roof, belt courses, and banded windows. The small, two-story house has a rectangular plan and a one-story ell. The walls are mainly brown brick, though the upper half of the second story is faced with stucco. The main block has a large window, which is flanked by sidelights. Around these is a plain stone surround. The ell, on the south wall, has two shallow bays. Small sections of brick walls with stucco edges decoratively project from some portions of the house.
