= Russell Barr Williamson =

American architect

- Born: May 2, 1893; Royal Center, Indiana, U.S.
- Died: October 3, 1964 (aged 71); Oostburg, Wisconsin, U.S.
- Education: Kansas State University; School of the Art Institute of Chicago
- Occupation: Architect
- Spouse: Nola Mae Hawthorne
- Children: 1 son, 1 daughter

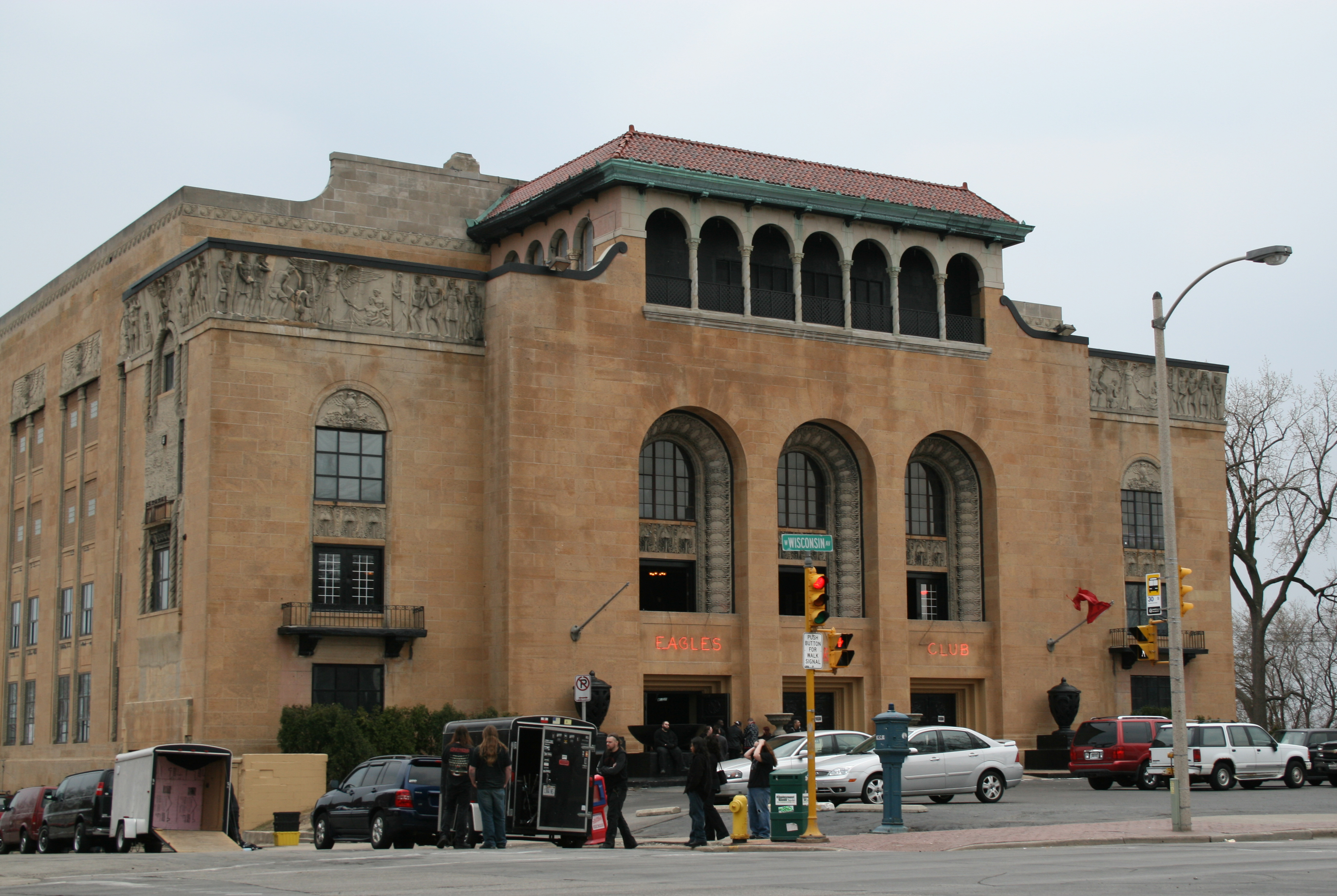
The Eagles Club, designed by Williamson.

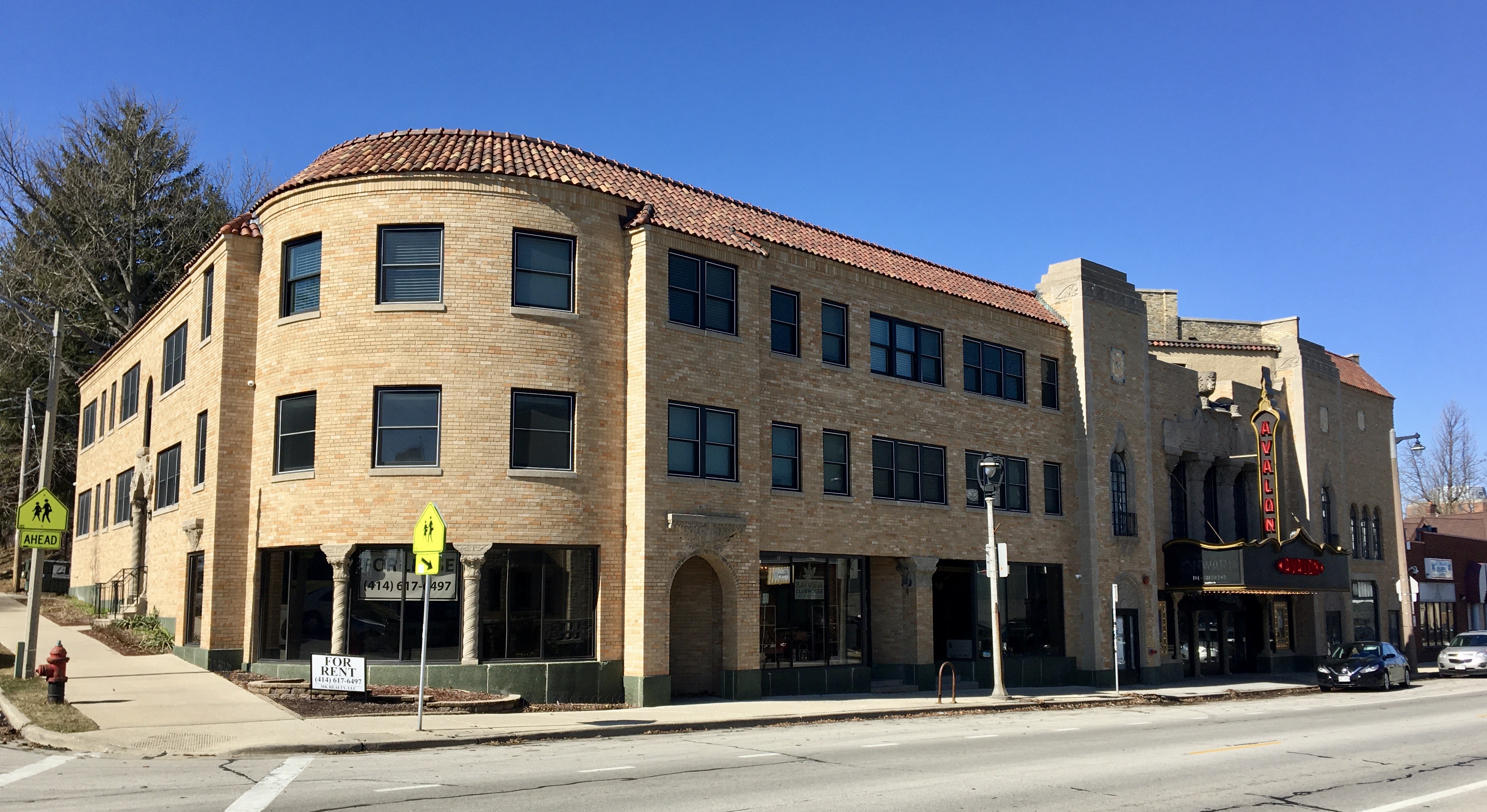
The Avalon Atmospheric Theatre designed by Russell Barr Williamson, Bay View Wisconsin

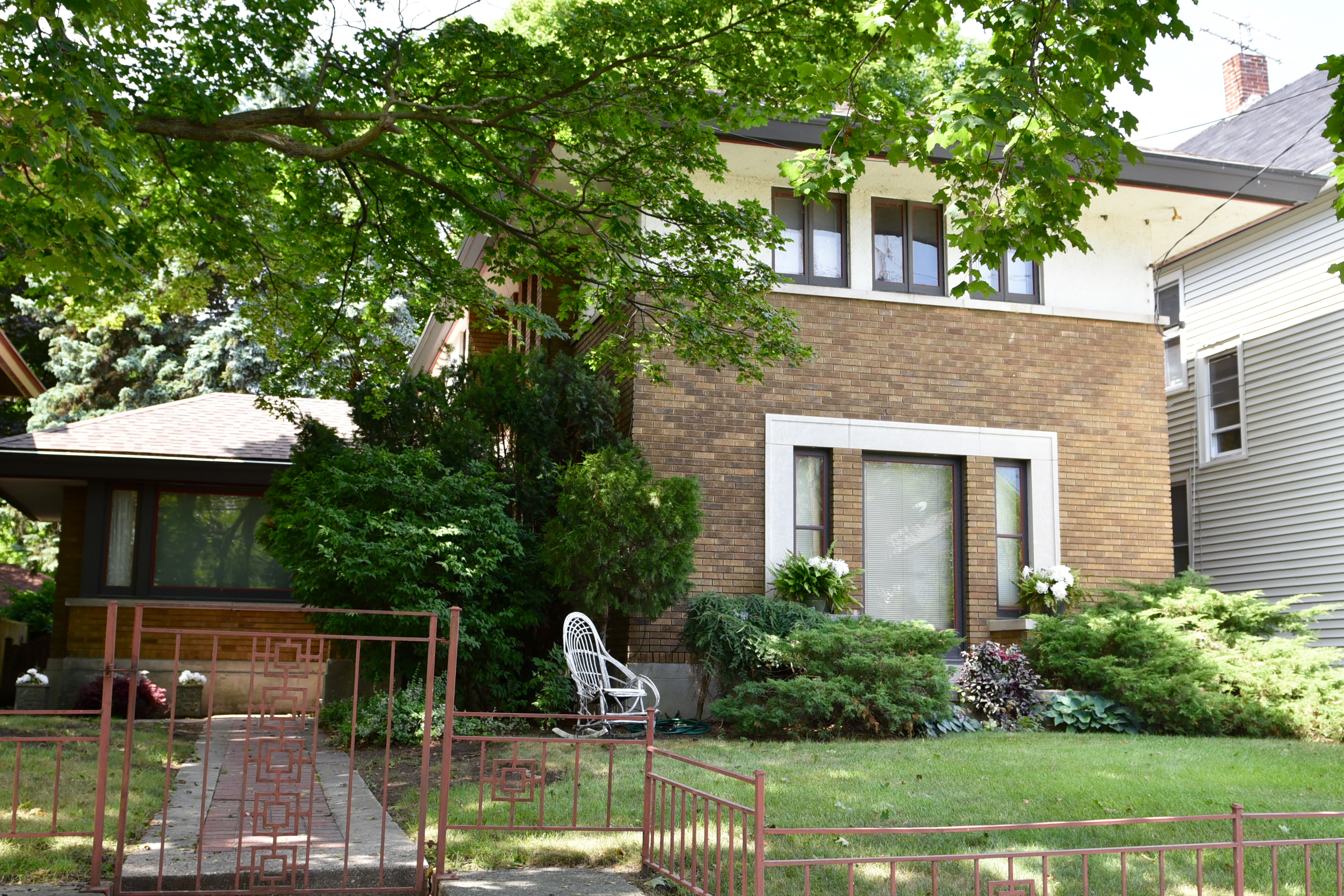
The Anthony and Caroline Isermann House, designed by Williamson.

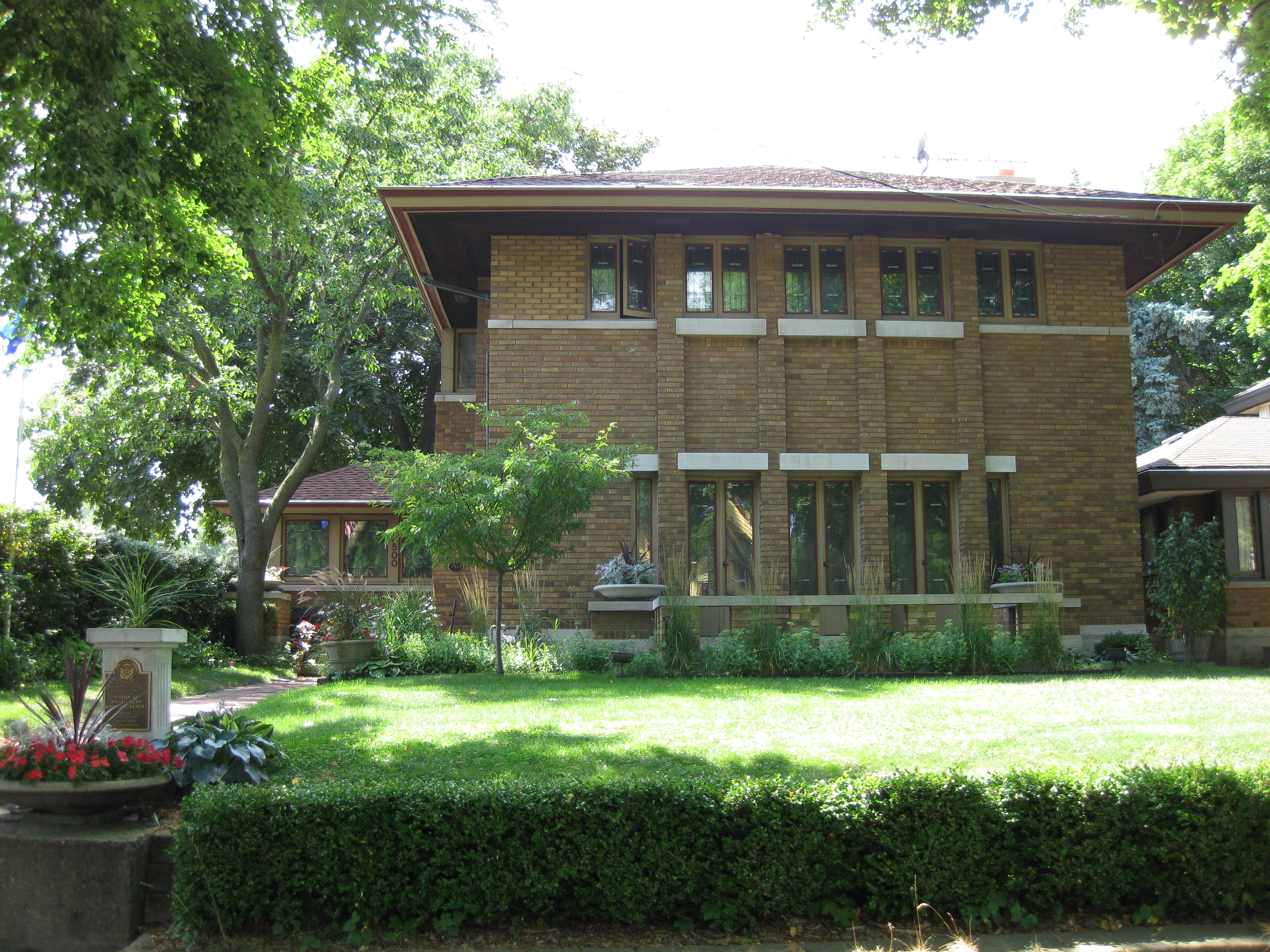
The Frank and Jane Isermann House, designed by Williamson.

Russell Barr Williamson (May 2, 1893 - October 3, 1964) was an American architect. He designed over 150 buildings, mostly in Wisconsin, and including the NRHP-listed Eagles Club in Milwaukee, the Avalon Atmospheric theatre in Bay View, the NRHP-listed Anthony and Caroline Isermann House and Frank and Jane Isermann House in Kenosha, and the NRHP-listed Dr. Thomas Robinson Bours House in Milwaukee. The Bours house is in the Newberry Boulevard Historic District.

== Life ==
Williamson was born on May 2, 1893, in Royal Center, Indiana, and he grew up near Princeton, Kansas. He graduated from the Kansas State University and the School of the Art Institute of Chicago.

Williamson worked as a draftsman and site supervisor for Frank Lloyd Wright from 1914 to 1917. It is sometimes reported that Williamson was a student of Wright, but that is incorrect. Williamson was hired by Wright after he graduated from architecture school and was paid a salary to create drawings and interpret specifications as an employee of Wright's studio. When Wright left for Japan to work on the Imperial Hotel, Williamson was made construction supervisor for the Frederick C. Bogk House and the Munkwitz Apartments in Milwaukee, Wisconsin. From 1914 to 1917, Williamson was tasked by Wright with applying standards to Wright's American System-Built Homes (ASBH) concept, though like Wright, he did not talk about the ASBH program after it ended.

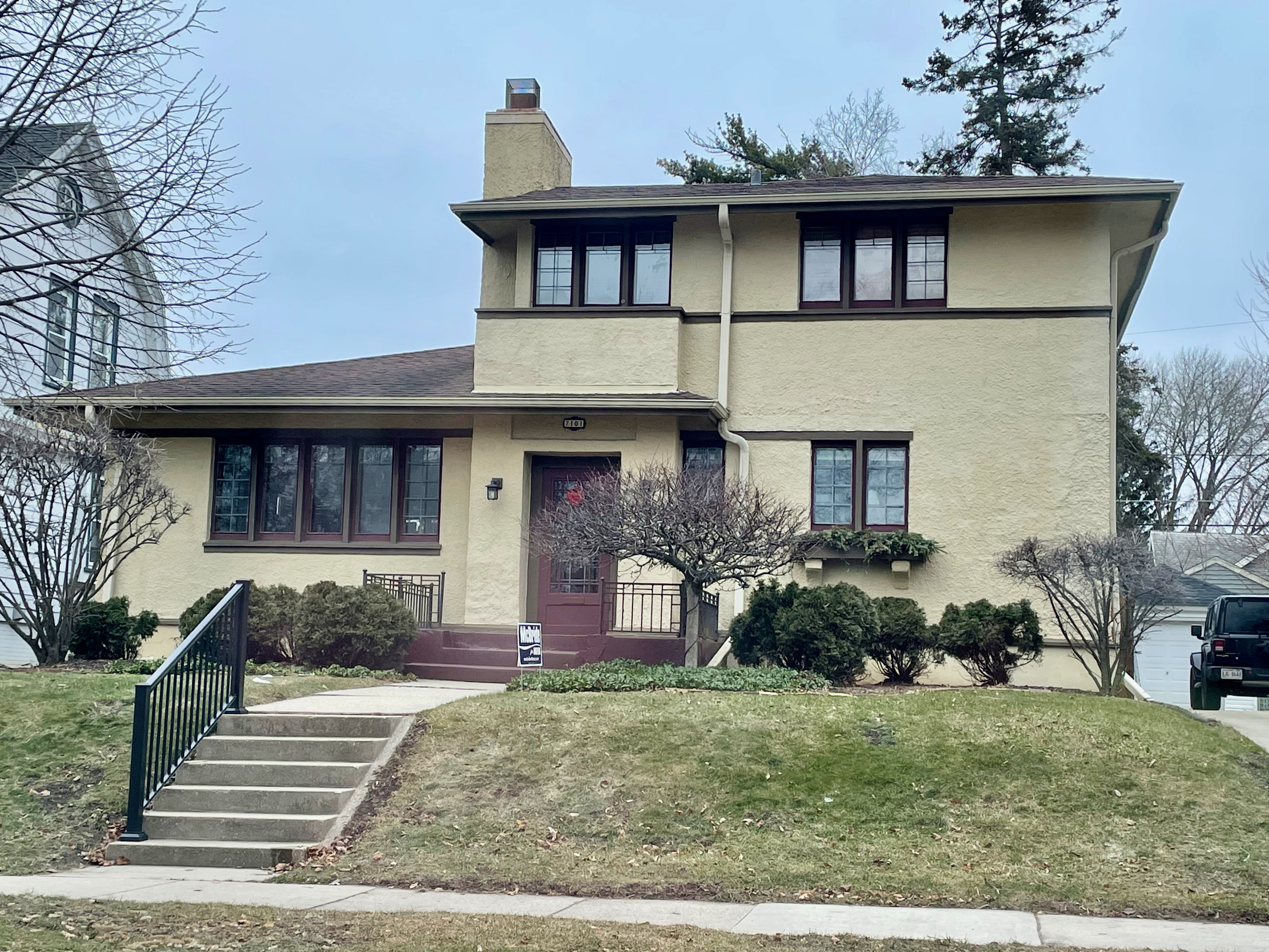
Two story home in Wauwatosa, Wisconsin designed in the Prairie Style by Russell Barr Williamson and sold by Arthur Richards

After leaving Wright's studio in 1917, he returned to Kansas City, Missouri briefly, and then moved back to Milwaukee, Wisconsin in 1918 to apply for his Wisconsin license to practice and to work closely with the developer Arthur Richards, Wright's former partner in the ASBH project. Between 1918 and 1929 Williamson designed about forty Wisconsin homes and duplexes in the Prairie Style, as well as the Tudor and Mediterranean Revival styles, many sold via Richard's real estate companies in Milwaukee suburbs like Shorewood, Wisconsin, Whitefish Bay, Wisconsin and Wauwatosa, Wisconsin. Some homes, like the Anthony Siegl House (1920) in Wauwatosa, feature details like trim, windows and surfaces that were repurposed from Richard's leftover stock after Frank Lloyd Wright's termination of the American System Built Homes project in 1917.

Williamson's architectural career was interrupted for nearly two decades by legal and financial troubles starting in 1927, when he – along with colleagues – was accused of misrepresenting real estate values in a scheme to sell mortgage bonds. In 1928–29, a speculative project to design and build an apartment building failed and he was forced into bankruptcy, eventually losing his family home to foreclosure.

In a second productive period from about 1950 to 1960, Williamson designed commercial and apartment buildings and split-level and ranch homes leaning to the Mid-Century Modern style. A complete Williamson portfolio is elusive since he destroyed drawings and records from much of his career.

Williamson married Nola Mae Hawthorne, and they had a son and a daughter. Williamson died of a heart attack on October 3, 1964, in Oostburg, Wisconsin, at age 71.
