= The Rave/Eagles Club =

Multi-purpose venue and landmark in Milwaukee, Wisconsin

Coordinates: 43°2′17.6″N 87°56′35.49″W

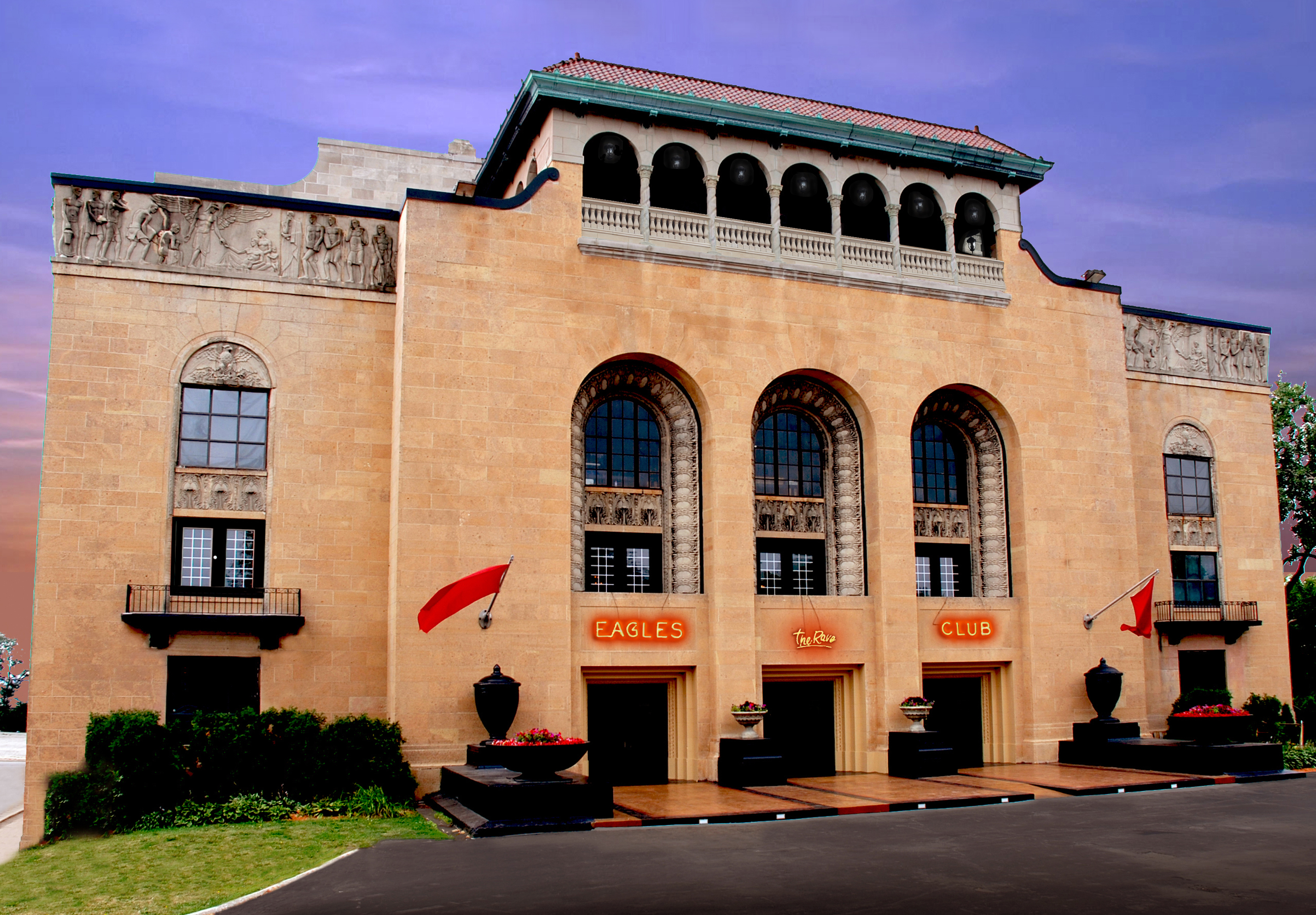
- Exterior of venue, seen from Wisconsin Ave (2009)
- Interactive map of The Rave/Eagles Club
- Former names: Eagles Club (1927-89); Central Park Athletic Club and Entertainment Center (1989-94)
- Address: 2401 W Wisconsin Ave; Milwaukee, WI 53233-1827
- Location: Avenues West
- Owner: Eagles Entertainment, Inc.
- Seating type: General Admission, Reserved Seating, VIP Seating, Theater Seating
- Capacity: 3,500 (Eagles Ballroom); 1,800 (Rave Hall); 500 (Rave Bar); 1000 (Rave II)

Construction
- Groundbreaking: April 16, 1925
- Opened: September 13, 1927
- Cost: $2.6 million
- Architect: Russell Barr Williamson
- General contractor: Immel Construction

Website
- Venue Website
- Eagles Club
- U.S. National Register of Historic Places
- Built: 1926
- Architectural style: 19th and 20th Century Revival (1924, 1927, 1939)
- NRHP reference No.: 86002096
- Added to NRHP: July 29, 1986

The Rave/Eagles Club (commonly known as simply The Rave, formerly known as the Eagles Club and Central Park Athletic Club and Entertainment Center or commonly Central Park Ballroom) is a concert venue and landmark in Milwaukee, Wisconsin.

== Divisions ==
The building is divided into 6 venues, making it theoretically possible to have six different acts playing at the same time.

=== The Eagles Ballroom ===
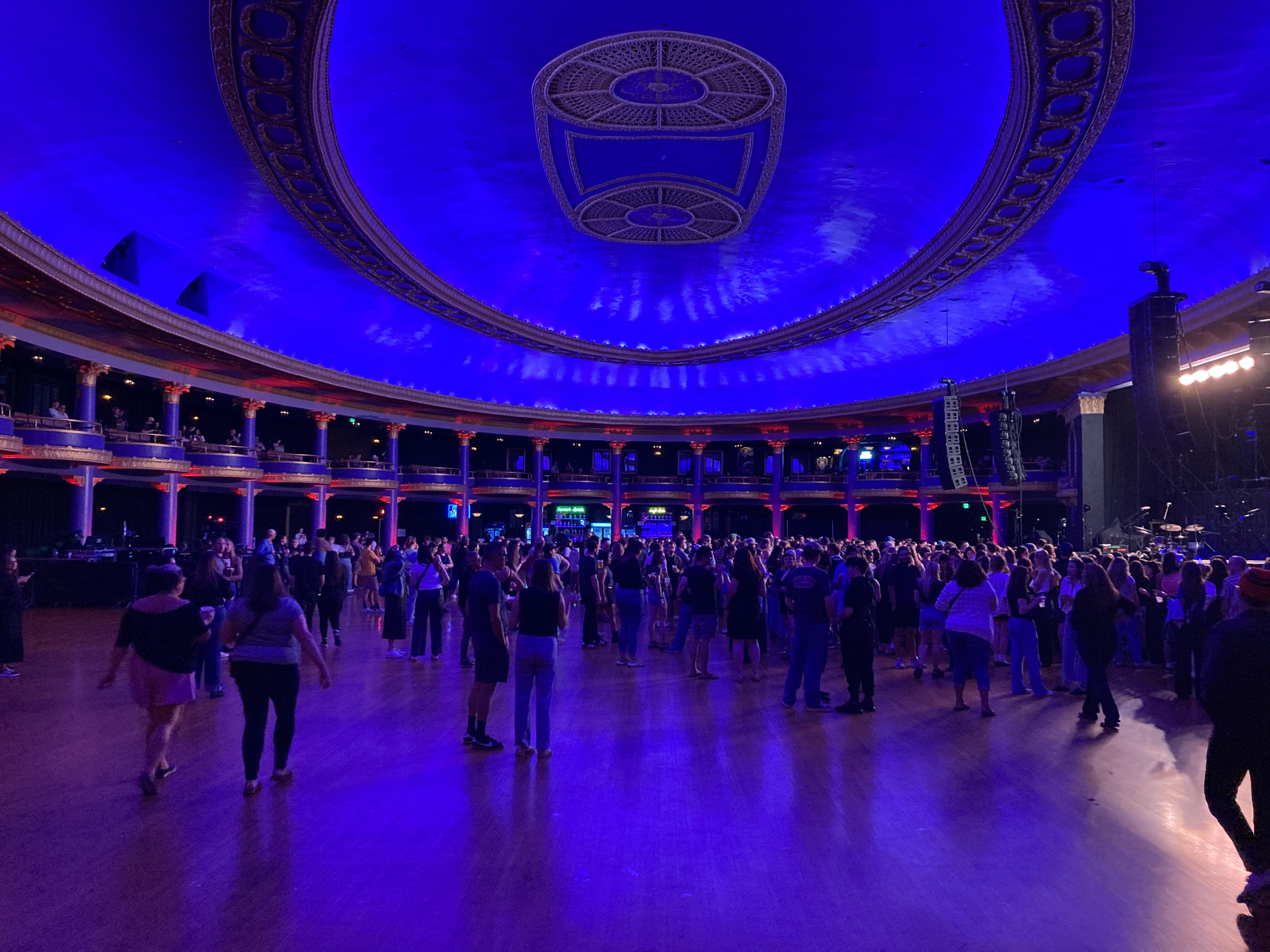
The Eagles Ballroom in 2025

The Eagles Ballroom is the building's showpiece, featuring a 25,000 square feet (2,300 m^{2}) oval wooden dancefloor, originally installed when the building was constructed, in addition to a large, old-fashioned domed ceiling and a stage on one side. Originally a ballroom, it has hosted everything from boxing matches to concerts to ethnic dances. There is a second floor, with a row of balconies around the oval, from one side of the stage to the other.

The Ballroom hosts the most popular acts, and its history includes Bob Dylan (six times), Sex Pistols, Siouxsie and the Banshees, Weezer, Morrissey, The Killers, The Offspring (nine times), Bad Religion (five times), The Grateful Dead, Oasis, The White Stripes, Pantera, Fugazi, Matchbox Twenty, Green Day, Bullet for My Valentine (eight times), Pierce The Veil, Shiny Toy Guns, Nine Inch Nails, Thirty Seconds to Mars, The Replacements, Paul Westerberg (solo), Social Distortion, Marilyn Manson, Megadeth, Maroon 5, Korn, XXXTentacion, Juice WRLD, Sexyy Red, Ye,Bad Omens J.P., Glorilla, Tupac Shakur, girl in red, $UICIDEBOY$, Ghostemane, Lil Baby, City Girls, YK Osiris, Coi Leray, Trippie Redd, Lil Durk, PnB Rock, Young Thug, City Morgue, Megan Thee Stallion, Denzel Curry, Twenty One Pilots, Kings of Leon, The Smashing Pumpkins, The All-American Rejects, Atreyu, No Doubt, Lamb of God, Robert Plant, Velvet Revolver, James Blunt, Phish, Slayer, Sublime with Rome, Infected Mushroom, Benny Benassi, My Chemical Romance, Nick Jonas & the Administration, All Time Low, Ed Sheeran, Kesha, Lil Pump, Lil Uzi Vert, 21 Savage, Huddy, Rihanna, Olivia Rodrigo, and many others.

The Jonas Brothers performed their first major concert as a headliner here, and filmed portions of the show to use in the music video for their top ten single "When You Look Me In the Eyes."

Jason Mraz also filmed a live DVD here, called Tonight, Not Again: Jason Mraz Live at the Eagles Ballroom.

The music video for CKY's song Close Yet Far was shot at The Rave.

Certain interview clips from All Time Low's 2010 DVD, Straight to DVD were filmed on the roof of the building.

The Rave hosted ECW events in 2000 such as Hardcore Heaven in May and various ECW on TNN episodes.

The Rave Eagles Grand Ballroom currently hosts Milwaukee based combat sports promotions North American Fighting Championship (NAFC) MMA & Knockout Kings Kickboxing.

=== The Rave Hall ===
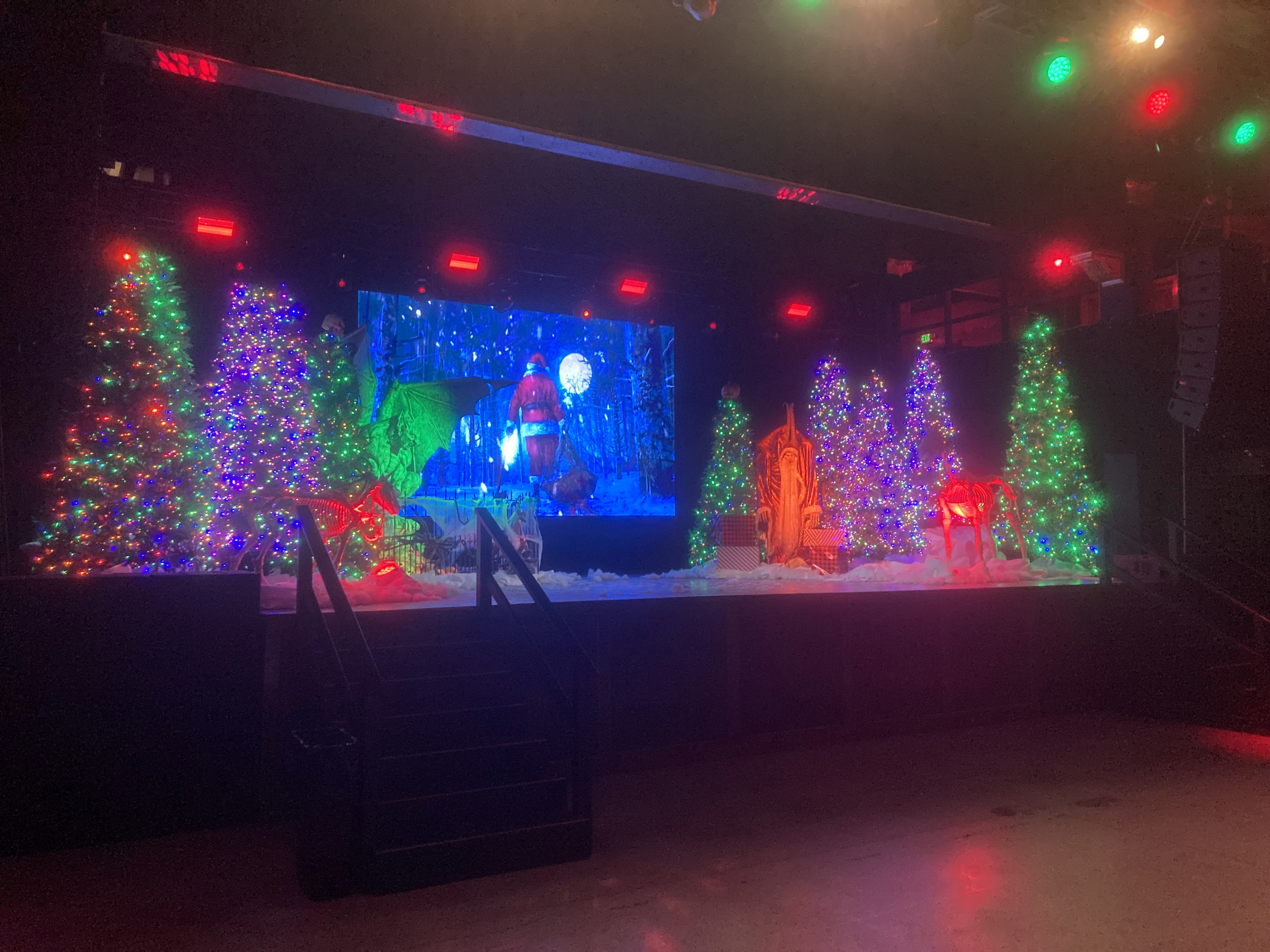
The Rave Hall during the 2025 Haunted Holidays Tours

The Rave Hall on the main level is a large concert-style venue, second in size only to the Eagles Ballroom above it. Most national touring artists that visit Milwaukee have played here, including John Mayer, Sevendust, Gwar, Regina Spektor, moe., Tiësto, Seaway, Chiodos and Bob Weir.

=== The Rave II ===
The Rave II, previously called the Eagles Hall, and the Basement, (or the Underground) is a Miami-style venue built in the basement of the building. Featuring a unique hardwood floor, it is often rented by members of the public for wedding receptions. It has hosted acts like the Buzzcocks, Owl City, Muse, Chappell Roan, Nickelback, Boys Like Girls, Fugazi, 3 Doors Down, Gov't Mule, and Third Eye Blind.

=== The Rave Bar ===
The Rave Bar is a small intimate club. Numerous acts have made their Wisconsin debut here, including Dave Matthews Band, Les Claypool, The Features, Third Eye Blind, Smash Mouth, Blink-182, Creed, Pearl Jam, Red Is The Sea, Cody Hansen, Unlimited Production Music-UPM (featuring: Ewill, Rob, Killah and Prod) and Tantric.

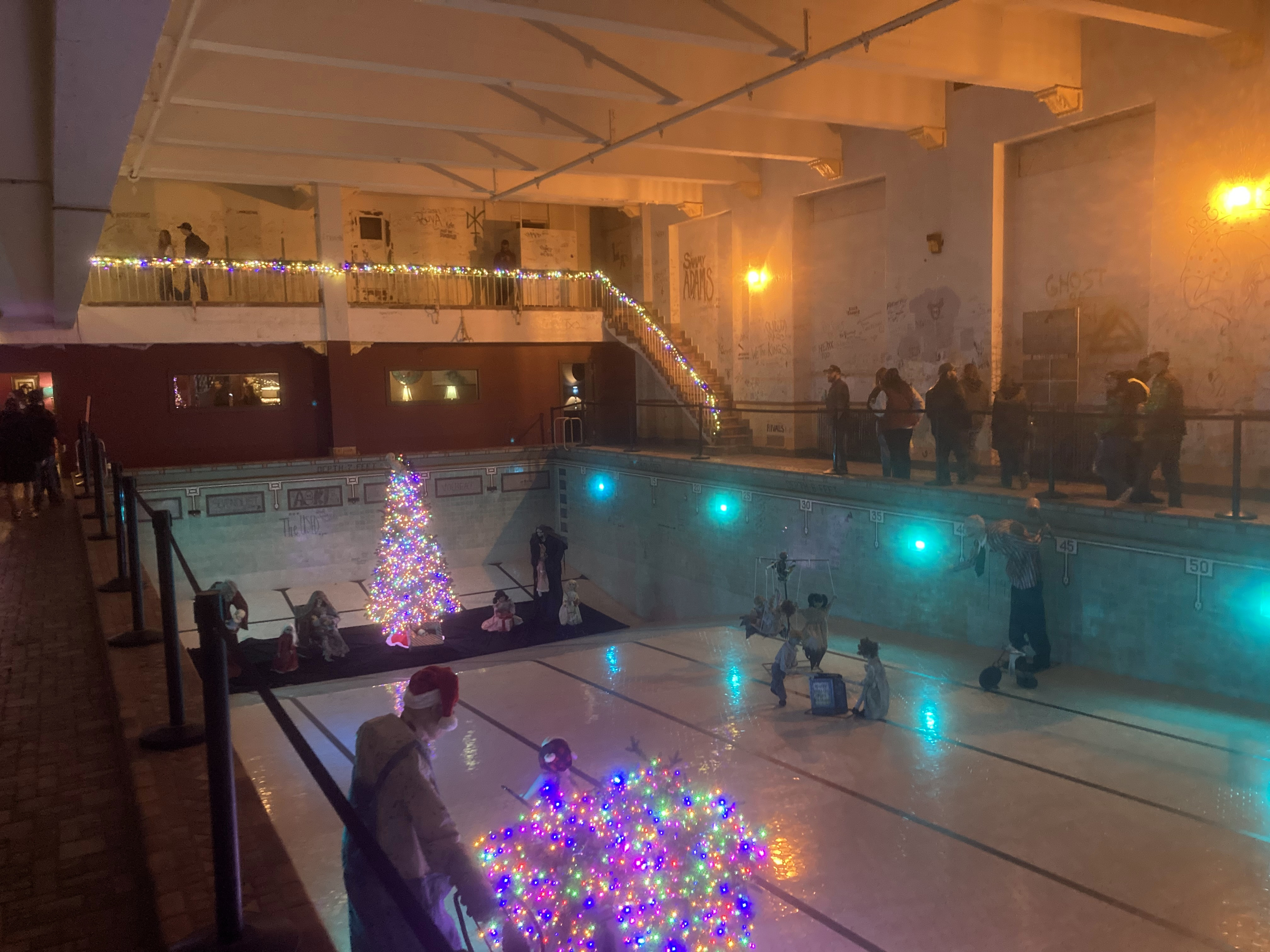
The pool during the 2025 Haunted Holidays Tours

There is an unused swimming pool in the basement. The walls of the pool room are signed by artists who have performed at the venue, and those who have sold out the Ballroom three times are allowed to sign inside the pool itself. Artists who have signed the pool include Alice in Chains, Kesha, T-Pain, and Mac Miller. Miller's signature has been reshared by fans on social media following his death. It reads: "I am Mac Miller. I once lived. Now I am dead. My soul remains here. Enjoy... P.S. I sold this place out 3 times."

=== The Rave Craft Beer Lounge ===
The Rave Vibe Room was designed to feature up and coming bands, similar to The Rave Bar, while also catering to DJ's.

=== The Penthouse Lounge ===
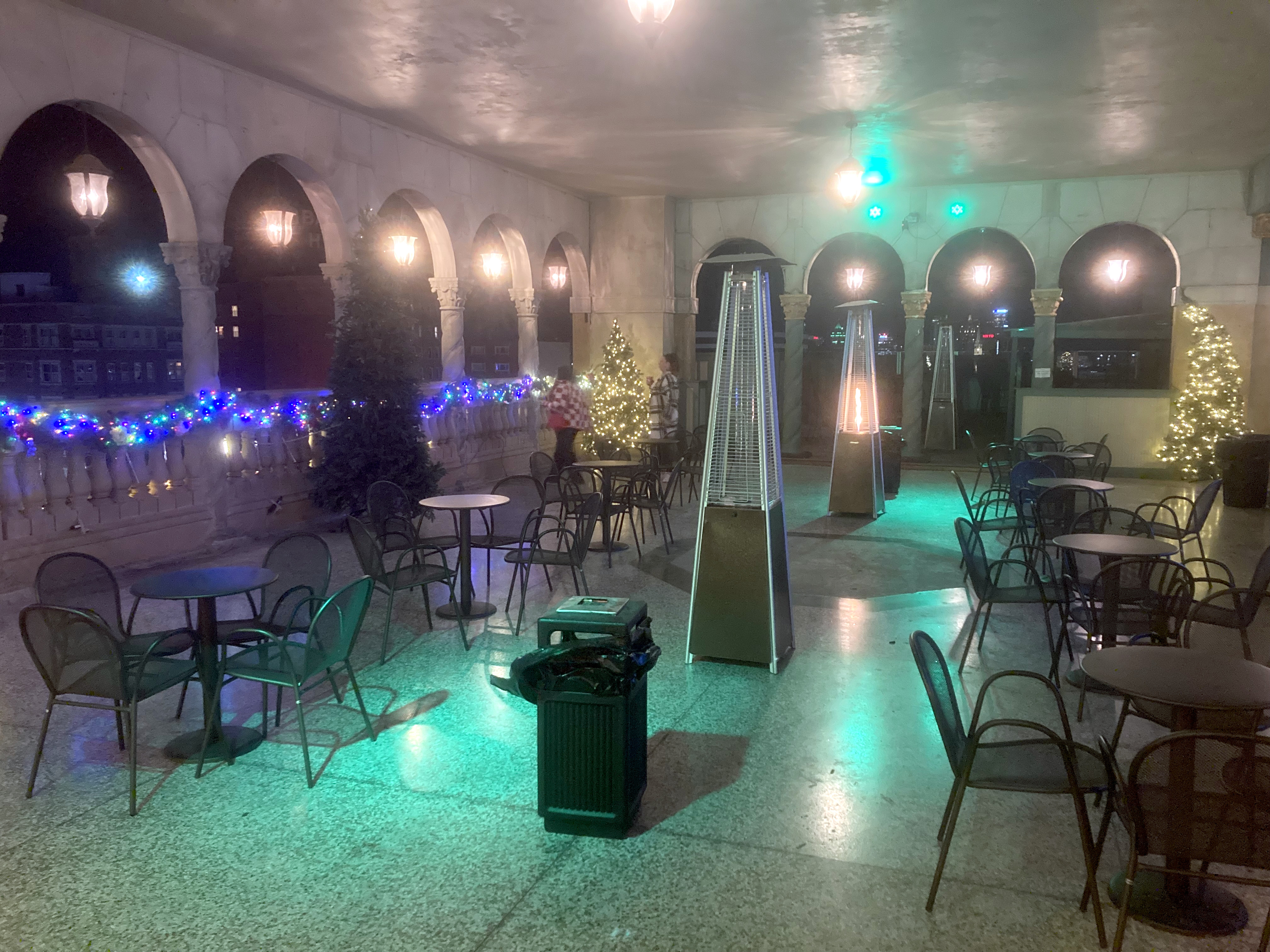
The Penthouse Lounge during the 2025 Haunted Holidays Tours

On the concierge level (2nd level) and comfortably holds a group of 200 or so with a full bar, table seating, and an optional stage.

=== Eagles Club ===
The Eagles Club was named to the National Register of Historic Places on July 29, 1986.

In March 2014, Dennis Munson Jr. died hours after his amateur debut as a kickboxer at Milwaukee's Eagles Club. An investigation by the Journal Sentinel uncovered a series of errors by the officials responsible for safety during the unregulated fight – part of the fast-growing world of combat sports.

== History ==
The Milwaukee Eagles' Aerie #137 was formed in 1901 by a group of actors, theater managers, and other stage men. It was the first Eagles lodge in the state. They met in a headquarters on Second Street until it burned, when they moved to 6th St. The aerie grew quickly and by 1925 was the second-largest Eagles chapter in the U.S.

In 1925 the chapter broke ground on a new clubhouse. Russell Barr Williamson designed the building, five stories tall, with Mediterranean Revival styling. The walls are stone, framing three round-topped recessed windows above the front entrance. Near the top of the wall is a wide frieze with a relief sculpture of human-eagle forms, rather similar to Assyrian art. The roof is covered in tile, typical of the Mediterranean Revival style. The grand opening for the Eagles Building was September 13, 1927.

== See also ==
- List of Fraternal Order of Eagles buildings
- National Register of Historic Places listings in Milwaukee
