= Elizabeth Murphy House =

House in Milwaukee, Wisconsin

Coordinates: 43°05′07″N 87°53′01″W

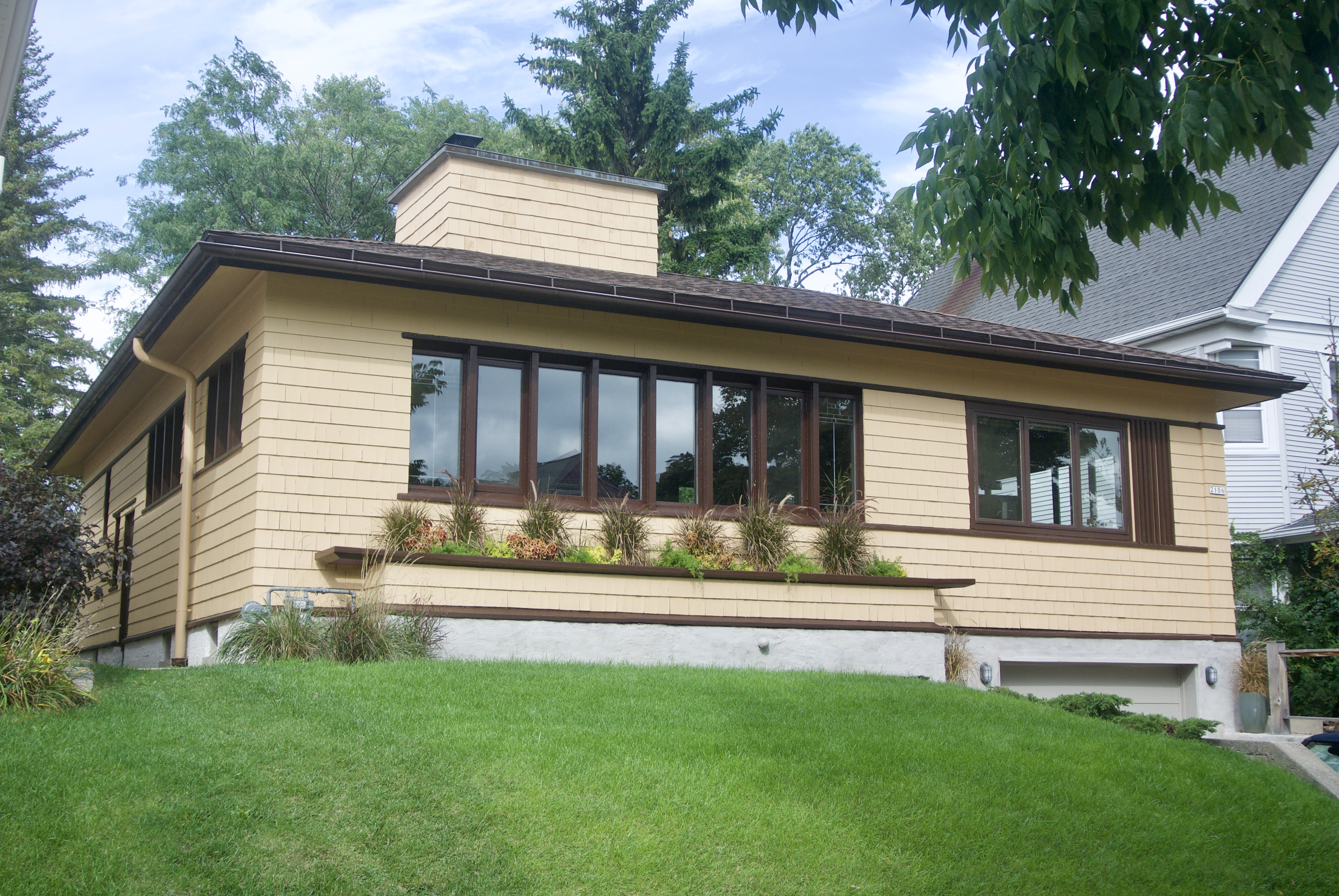
Frank Lloyd Wright's Elizabeth Murphy House in 2019

The Elizabeth Murphy House is an American System-Built Home (ASBH), Model A203, designed by Frank Lloyd Wright, and located in the Village of Shorewood near Milwaukee, Wisconsin. The house takes its name from Elizabeth Murphy, a resident of Shorewood and wife of loan broker Lawrence Murphy, who purchased a lot as an investment on which to build the house speculatively. It was built in 1917 and is a private residence.

== History ==
Murphy contracted with Herman F. Krause Jr., a local carpenter, to build the house in 1917 according to plans supplied by Frank Lloyd Wright via Wright's marketing agent for ASBH projects, the Arthur L. Richards Company. A lawsuit and liens filed in 1919 reveal that construction took longer and cost more than expected. For example, Krause sued the Murphys for unpaid invoices and the Murphys countered by claiming incomplete work. The architect is named as final decision-maker for changes suggested by the contractor to hold down costs, but absence of correspondence suggests that he was not consulted. Despite the trouble, the home's dimensions and layout are exact matches to the architect's drawings, although it was constructed in a mirror image to accommodate lot proportions and the relationship to neighboring houses.

The lot and home were sold by Elizabeth Murphy to Alfred and Gladys Kibbie in 1919 for $5,200. Since the Kibbies purchased the house before the lawsuit was settled, they were also named as defendants. The lawsuit was found in favor of Murphy and the Kibbies, suggesting that the house was finished by someone other than Krause. The Kibbie family lived in the house until 1941 when it was advertised as a Frank Lloyd Wright-designed bungalow and priced to sell for $5,300. The house changed hands again in 1972 and 1993. Lawyers for the family of a deceased owner elected to leave the architect's name off an advertisement to sell the home in 1993, hoping to reach a broader selection of potential buyers by minimizing perceived barriers to ownership related to the home's history, so its architectural significance was forgotten for a time. When it was purchased that year, the buyers suspected it to be a "special" design, but did not know who designed it.

The house was featured as a stop on the 2017 and 2023 Wright and Like Tours, organized by Wright in Wisconsin. It is listed in the Fourth Edition of William A. Storrer's The Architecture of Frank Lloyd Wright, A Complete Catalog.

== Description ==
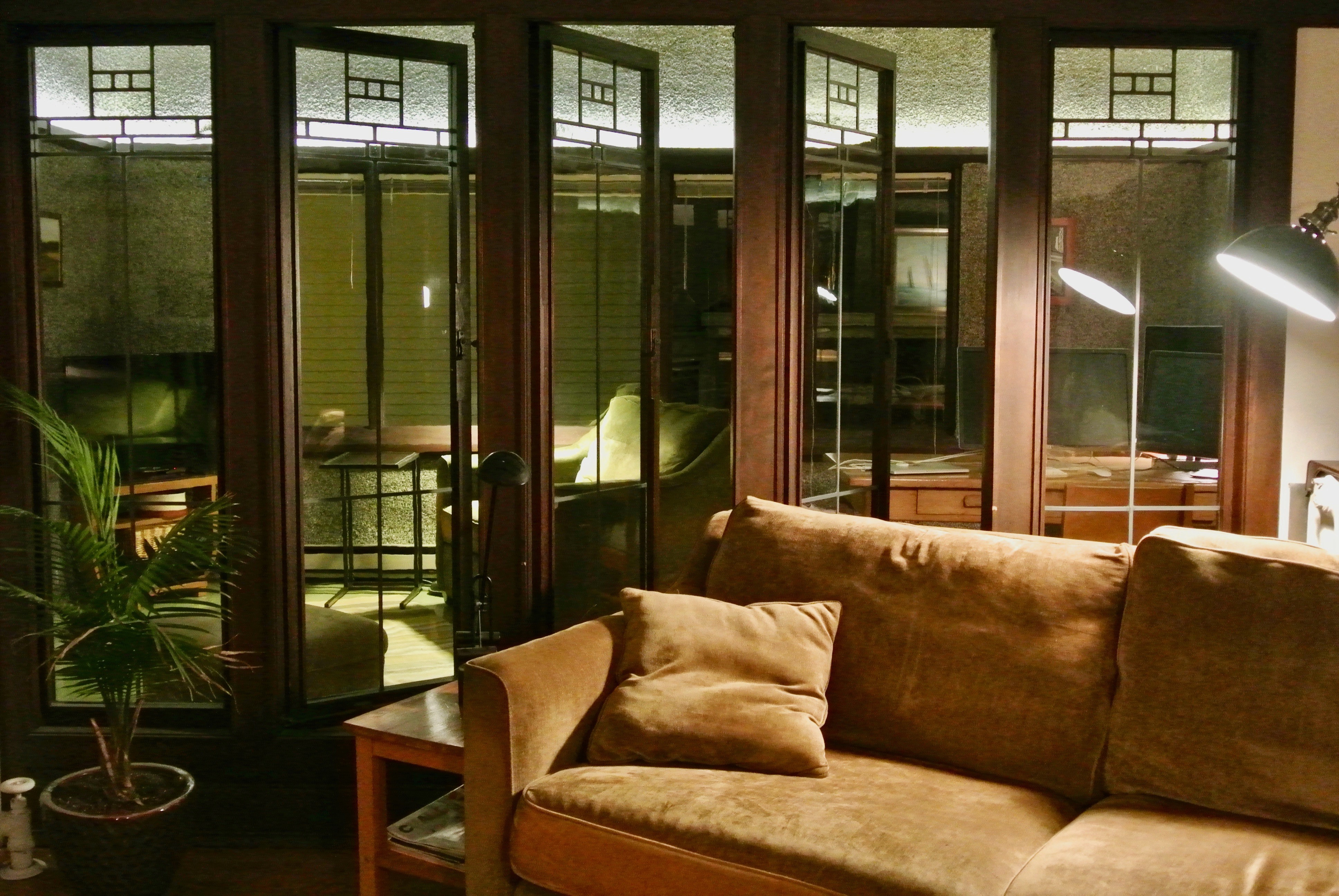
Elizabeth Murphy House Interior Art Glass Windows

The house is a one-story cottage with two bedrooms and one bath, a breakfast nook, a large open living area with a brick fireplace and an open-air (since enclosed) sleeping porch.

The floorplan and most of the interior are undisturbed and in original form. The interior includes birch trim with the original rubbed-shellac finish, dining and kitchen cabinets and leaded art-glass doors, windows and light screens with a simple motif that mirrors the homes facade. Modifications include shingles over the original exterior pebble-dash stucco, double pane-glass windows where there were once single panes, and the excavation of a garage where there was once a crawl space under the sleeping porch.

=== Drawings ===
Plan records for ASBH Model A203 are held in the Frank Lloyd Wright Foundation Archives (1082.001). A drawing from a brochure page shows model A201 as featuring a flat roof, model A202 with a gabled roof, and A203 with a hip roof.

The amateur Wright historian Richard Johnson visited the home in 2012 and presented the owners with drawings by Wright that he thought would reaffirm its pedigree. Johnson, along with Dominique Watts and William A. Storrer, was researching lost works by the architect for a book that was not published. In 2015, onsite inspections and court records compiled by Michael P. Lilek, the then Curator of American System-Built Homes with Frank Lloyd Wright Wisconsin, Inc., confirmed the house as a Wright design by comparing construction features with Wright's model A203 and named the home the "Elizabeth Murphy House," based on the practice that Wright homes be named for the original buyer.

== See also ==
- List of Frank Lloyd Wright works
