= American System-Built Homes =

1910s houses in the Midwestern US

The American System-Built Homes were modest houses in a series designed by architect Frank Lloyd Wright. They were developed between 1911 and 1917 to fulfill his interest in affordable housing but were sold commercially for just 14 months. The Wright archives include 973 drawings and hundreds of reference materials, the largest collection of any of single Wright project. Wright cancelled the project in July 1917 by successfully suing his partner Arthur Richards for payments due and rarely spoke of the program again. The designs were standardized and modular, so customers could choose from one hundred and twenty nine models on seven floorplans and three roof styles. Most materials were prepared and organized at Arthur Richards' lumber yard, so there was less waste and specialized labor needed for construction. Milled and marked materials were delivered to the work site for cutting and assembly by a carpenter. Windows, doors and some cabinetry were built at the yard. Frames, shelves, trim and some fixtures were cut and assembled on site. Most wood parts had a part number and corresponding instructions and drawings for joining, fit and finish. Richards' yard also supplied plaster, concrete, paint and hardware.

To minimize materials and job site labor, Wright used twenty-four inch (on center) distances between studs and oversized joists and a commercially available, pre-milled structural lath called "Byrkit" to bridge unsupported sections. These choices enabled standardized 21-1/2" wide casement windows from 26 to 64 inches high to be hung between studs without need for headers. Oversized 12 by 2 inch floor and ceiling joists and Byrkit lath are key identifying features in the search for Wright's ASBHs lost or forgotten.

Many extant homes remain in private hands and an ad hoc homeowners group gathers to share ideas. Six structures are located in a federal historic district in Milwaukee, Wisconsin, and others have been designated Chicago Landmarks in Chicago, Illinois.

== Background and history ==
In 1911, Arthur L. Richards and a partner contracted with Frank Lloyd Wright to design a hotel in Lake Geneva, Wisconsin and Richards learned of Wright's idea to offer a family of residential housing designs that would share style, parts and pieces.

In 1914, the young architect Russell Barr Williamson (then called Russell Williamson) joined Frank Lloyd Wright's studio and was tasked as the main draftsperson on the project. Williamson kept a register of models and features and was responsible for creating and issuing the construction drawings required by a contractor to build a house, when one was sold.

In 1914-15, Richards purchased four designs and built six buildings in a demonstration neighborhood and investment in Milwaukee, Wisconsin, now called the "Burnham Block". In 1916, Wright and Richards signed a commercial contract giving Richards the exclusive rights to manufacture and distribute the homes and Wright the job of design and specification. Richards sold franchises to market the homes and planned to allow only approved contractors to build them, though some homes were built independently. Richards had offices in Milwaukee, the Chicago area, Champaign, Decatur and Gary. The customer purchased a completed home, sometimes directly from The Richards Company, or alternatively, from speculators to whom Richards had sold plans and materials.

In July, 1917, Wright, dissatisfied with Richards, fearing loss of intellectual property, and with World War I as cover, sued for nonpayment of royalties and fees, and the project came to an end, though the court found that home construction started before ruling could be completed.

Williamson was let go or left Wright's studio when the project was cancelled and then teamed with Richards to continue designing and selling Prairie School and more conventionally designed homes using standardized practices under the short-lived brand "American Renaissance Homes", Richards Real Estate and other companies. Wright, meanwhile, walked away from Prairie Architecture to focus on and finish his Imperial Hotel, Tokyo project and transition his own designs to include Mayan and Asian influences.

It is believed that about 25 System-Built Homes were constructed, but only 12 are known to have survived. They can be found in Wisconsin, Illinois, Indiana, and Iowa.

== Prototype Burnham Street Historic District, Milwaukee ==
- Prototype American System Built Homes-Burnham Street District
- U.S. National Register of Historic Places
- U.S. Historic district
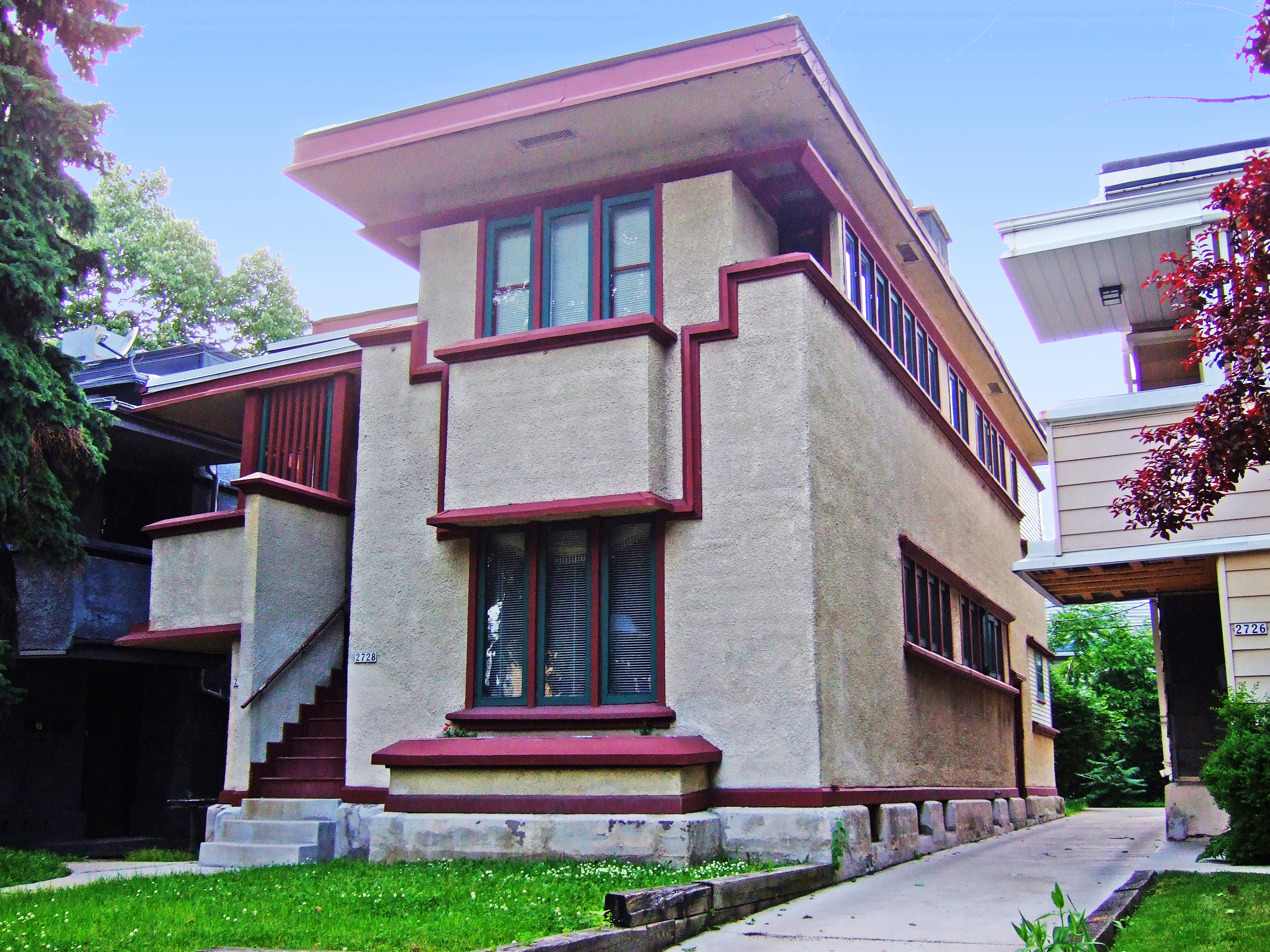
- Model F Duplex

- Location within Wisconsin Location within the United States
- Location: Milwaukee, Wisconsin
- Coordinates: 43°0′38″N 87°56′55″W
- Area: 0.5 acres (0.20 ha)
- Built: 1914 – 1915
- Architect: Frank Lloyd Wright
- Architectural style: Prairie Style
- NRHP reference No.: 85002166
- Added to NRHP: September 12, 1985

Six demonstrator homes were built speculatively in the Burnham Park neighborhood of Milwaukee by Arthur Richards in 1915-16 and were added to the National Register of Historic Places in 1985. There are four model 7a duplexes, a model B1 bungalow, and a model C3 bungalow. It is the only grouping of Frank Lloyd Wright-designed homes that includes both duplexes and single-family dwellings. Most of the homes have been purchased by Frank Lloyd Wright’s Burnham Block, Inc., a 501(c)3 charitable organization. The B1 bungalow was restored in 2010, with one of the duplexes to follow. They are located in the 2700 block of West Burnham Street, at South Layton Boulevard.

Richards' Burnham Block served as a testing ground for Wright's ideas, informing the formal contract and branding that ramped up starting in 1916. Therefore, details found in the prototype homes and the commercial homes are different. Elements found in the Burnham block but not in commercial homes can be seen as experimental. Elements found only in commercial homes can be seen as refinements of the system.

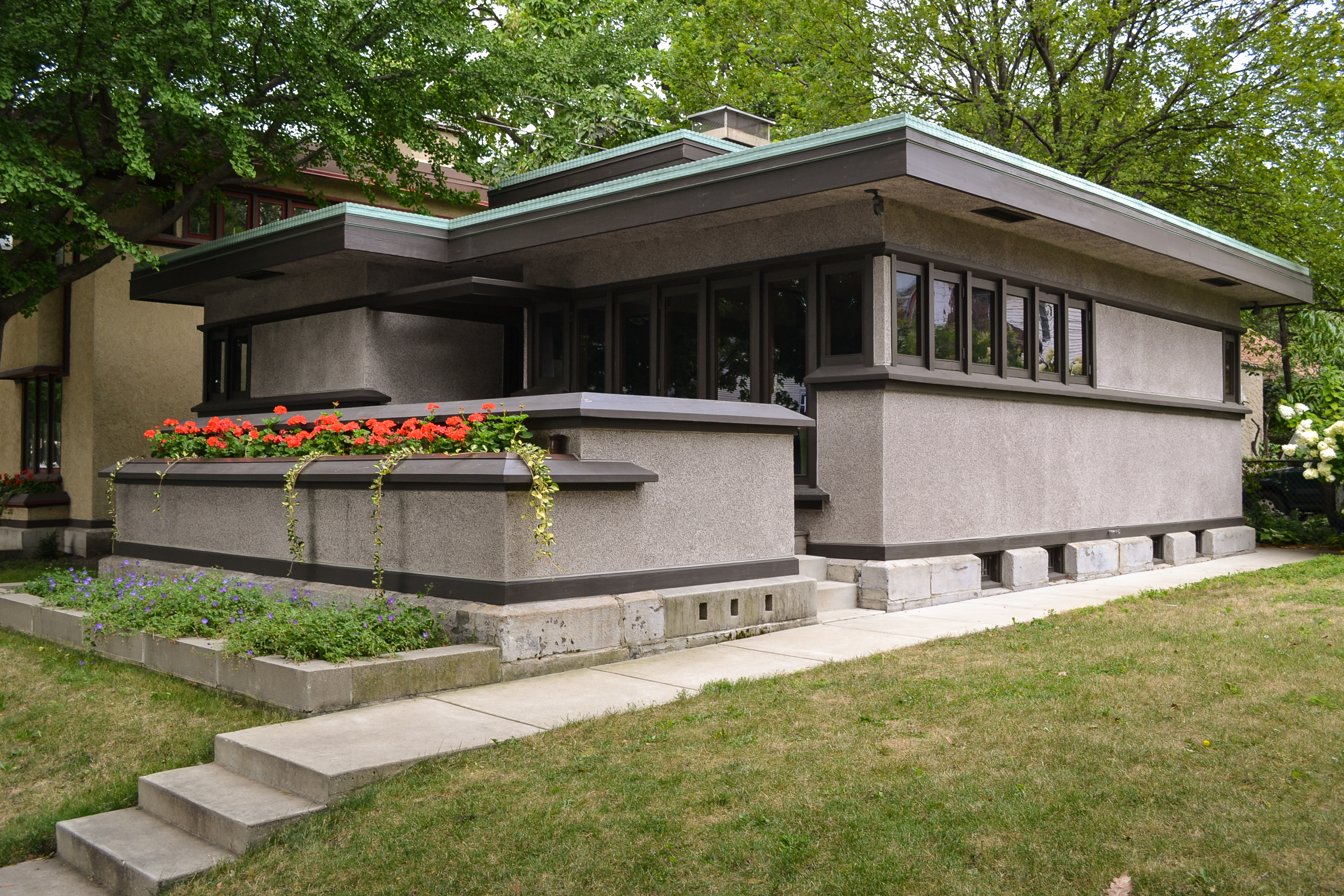
2714 W Burnham St Model B1 bungalow, taken August 2017.

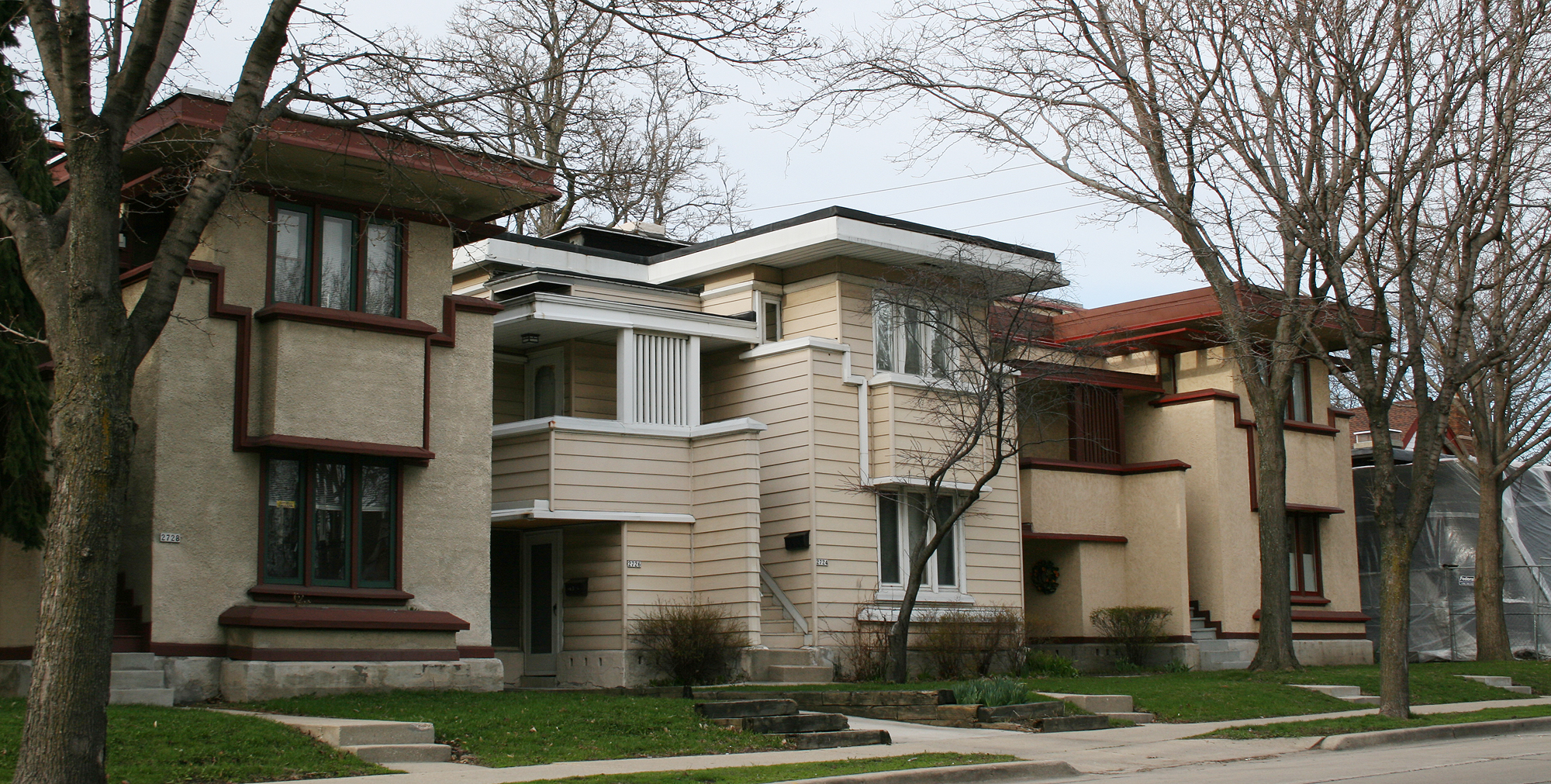
Three of the six American System-Built Homes in the Burnham Street Historic District, Milwaukee, Wisconsin

Prototype American System Built Homes in the Burnham Street District:

- Arthur L. Richards Duplex Apartments - referred to as either "Model 7a Duplexes", "Model C" or "Model F" - 4 units, 3 identical units (2720-2730 West Burnham), the 4th unit (2732-2734 West Burnham) is a mirror image. The second house from the west has been converted to a single family home. Built 1915.
- Arthur L. Richards Small House - "Model B1" or "Cottage B" located at 2714 West Burnham Street. Built 1915.
- Richards Bungalow - "Model C3" or "Cottage A" located at 1835 South Layton Boulevard. Built 1915. This house was resurfaced in precast coral stone veneer in 1956.

== The Munkwitz Apartments, Milwaukee ==
The Arthur R. Munkwitz Duplex Apartments were pair of four-unit apartment buildings built in 1916. The Munkwitz Duplexes were based on an American System-Built Homes plan and constructed on 1102-1112 N. 27th Street under the supervision of Russell Barr Williamson. They were demolished in 1973 to widen the street.

== Commercial American System-Built Homes in Illinois, Wisconsin and Iowa ==
Commercial ASBHs are homes started under the Wright-Richards contract and built by contractors to Wright's specification with material supplied by Richards.

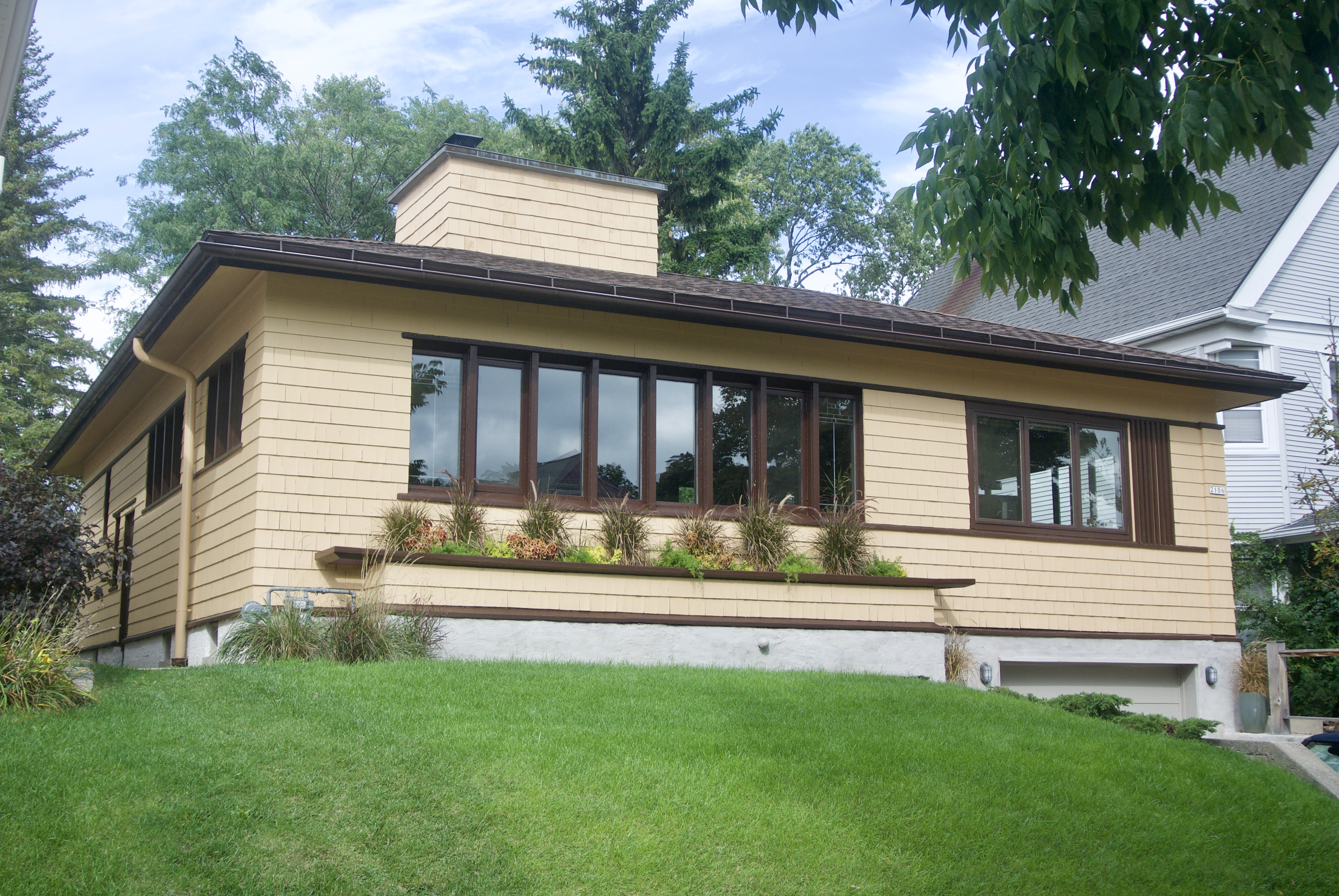
The Elizabeth Murphy House

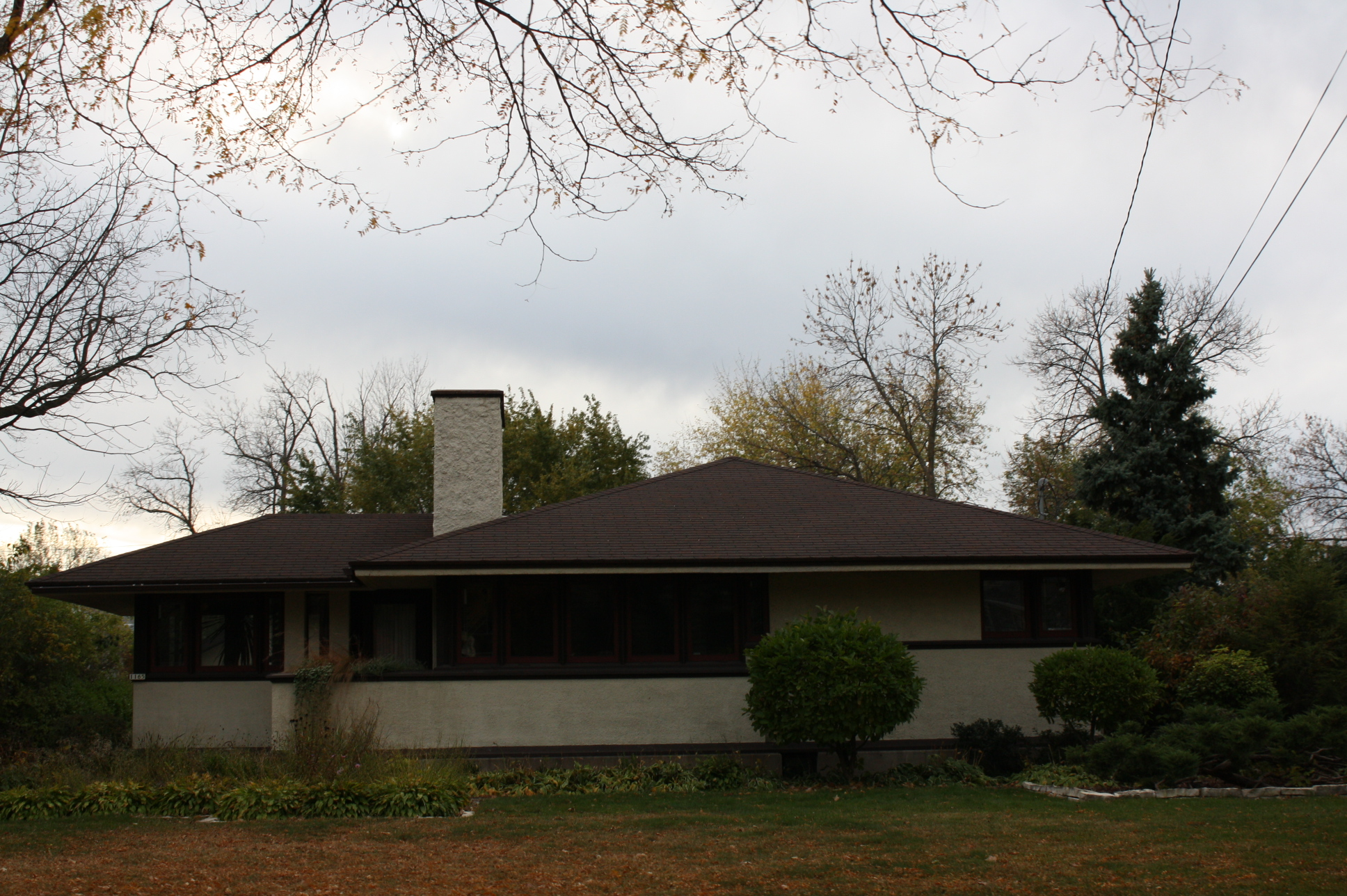
Hunt House II

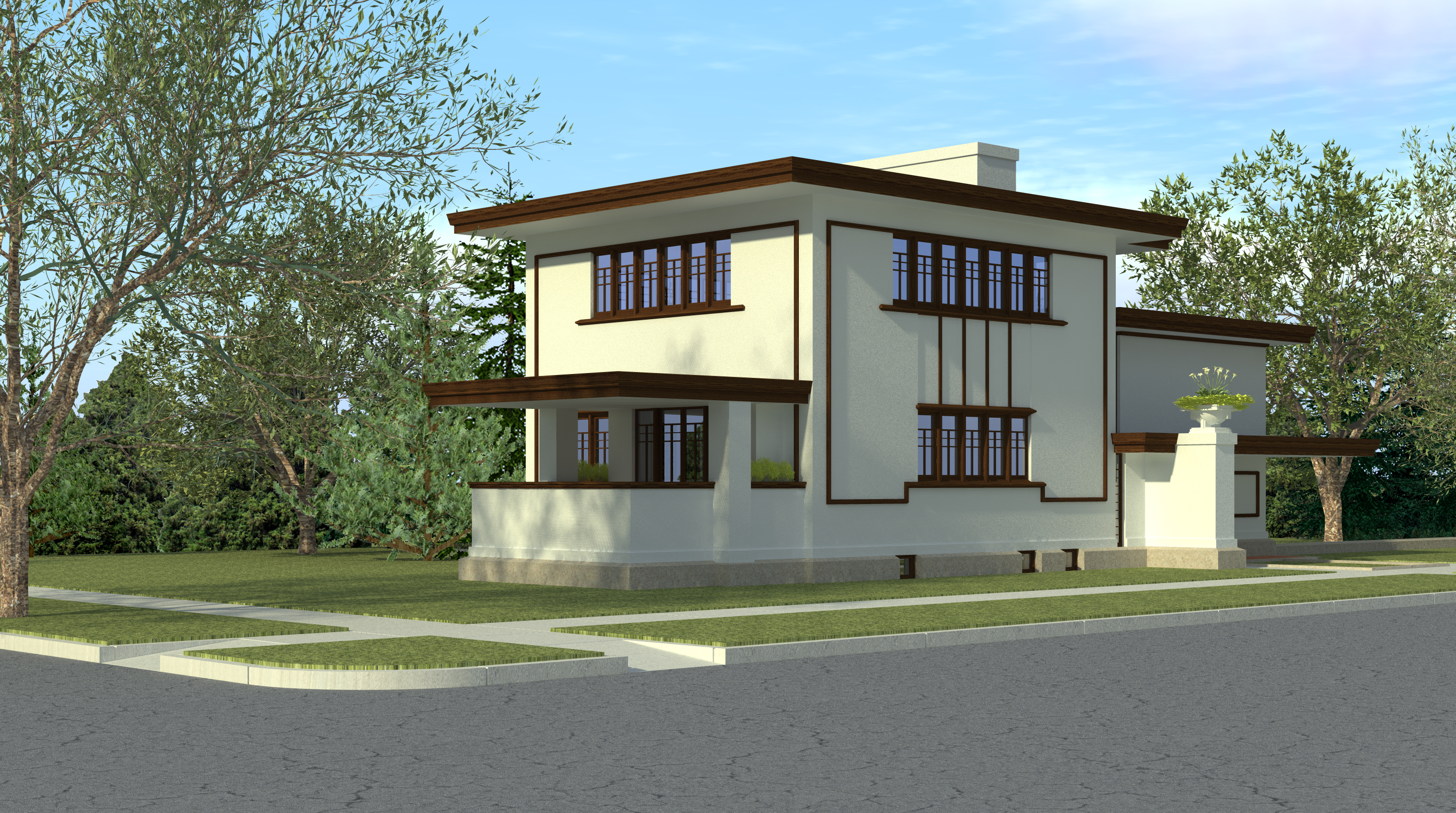
Reconstruction rendering of the Wynant House

Single-story, single family units:

- Lewis E. Burleigh House - Wilmette, Illinois (1915)
- Ida and Grace McElwain House - Lake Bluff, Illinois (1915)
- The Elizabeth Murphy House (A203) - Shorewood, Wisconsin (1917)
- Stephen M. B. Hunt House II - Oshkosh, Wisconsin (1917)

Two-story, single-family units:

- Wilbur Wynant House - Gary, Indiana (1916)
- Oscar A. Johnson House - Evanston, Illinois (1917)
- A.B. Groves House (AA202) - Madison, Wisconsin (1917)
- Delbert W. Meier House - Monona, Iowa (1917)
- Charles Heisen House - Villa Park, Illinois (1917)

== Chicago Landmark homes ==
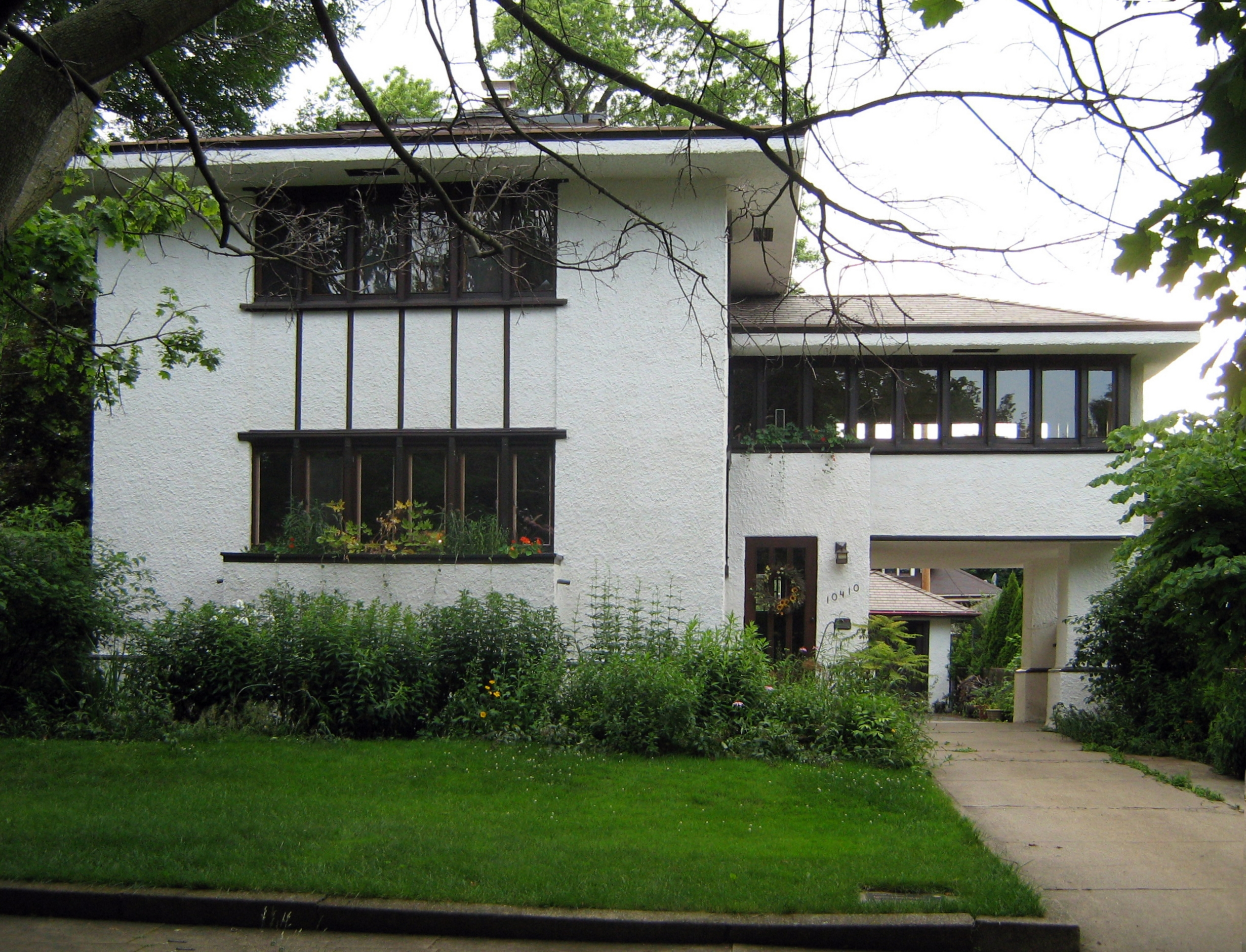
Guy C. Smith House

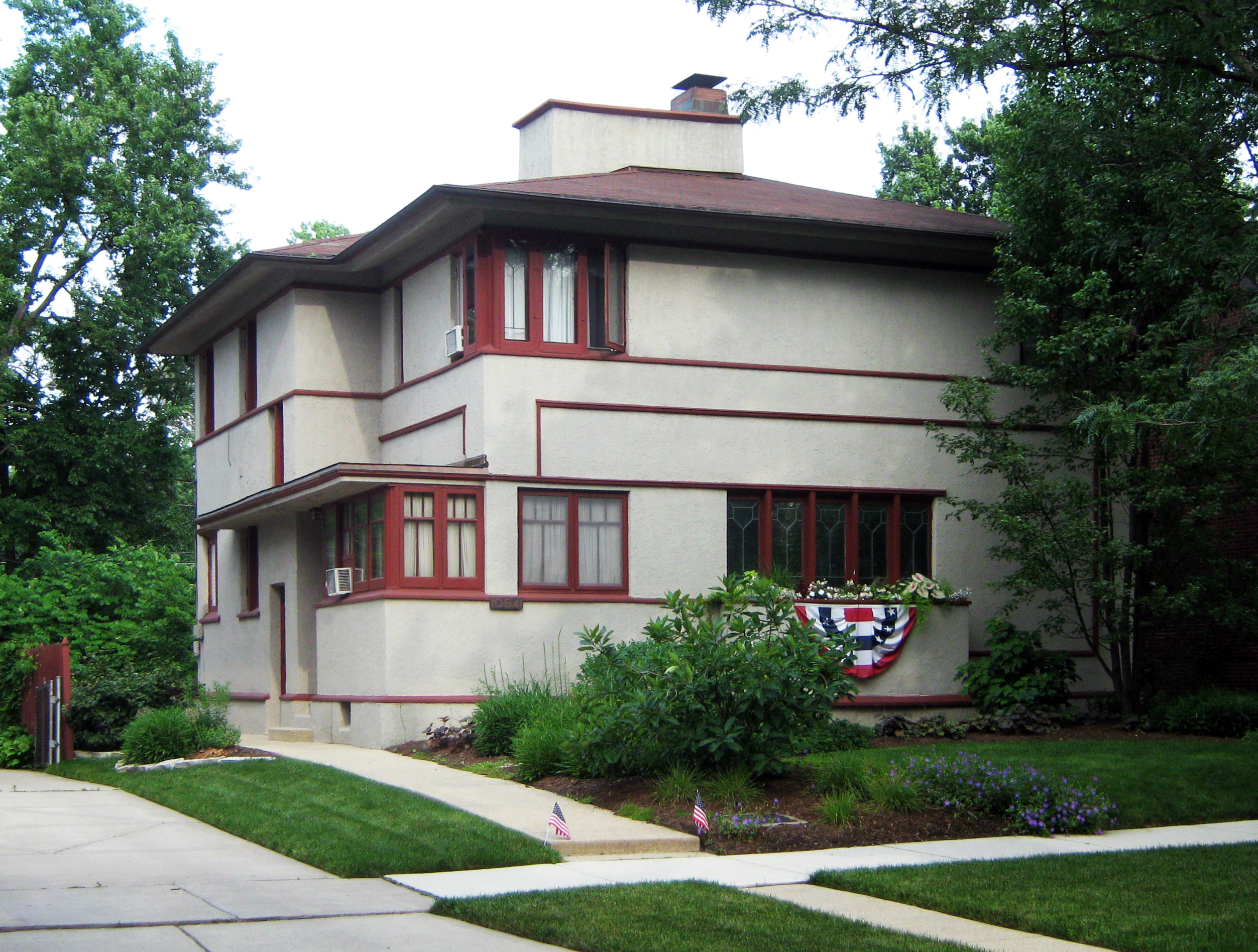
H. Howard Hyde House

On July 13, 1994, the Mayor and City Council of Chicago designated two System-Built Homes as Chicago Landmarks. Built in 1917, they are located at 10410 (the Guy C. Smith House) and 10541 S. Hoyne Avenue (the H. Howard Hyde House). The first, at 10410 Hoyne, was intended to be the first of a subdivision of the homes and was built and sold speculatively. Both the Smith and Hyde Houses are two-story, single-family units.

== Rumored, but ruled-out ==
It had been speculated that a home in Lake Bluff, Illinois called the Vanderkloot-McElwain House was an ASBH Model C3. In 2023, John Waters of the Frank Lloyd Wright Building Conservancy inspected the property in 2023 and found that the home does not match any known Wright design and contains features, like conventional lath (as opposed to Byrkit lath) and a "rambling" floor-plan, to indicate that it is not an ASBH. At the time, the home was in disrepair and feared to be failing, so the work to prove or disprove its pedigree was timely.

== Suspected but not verified ==
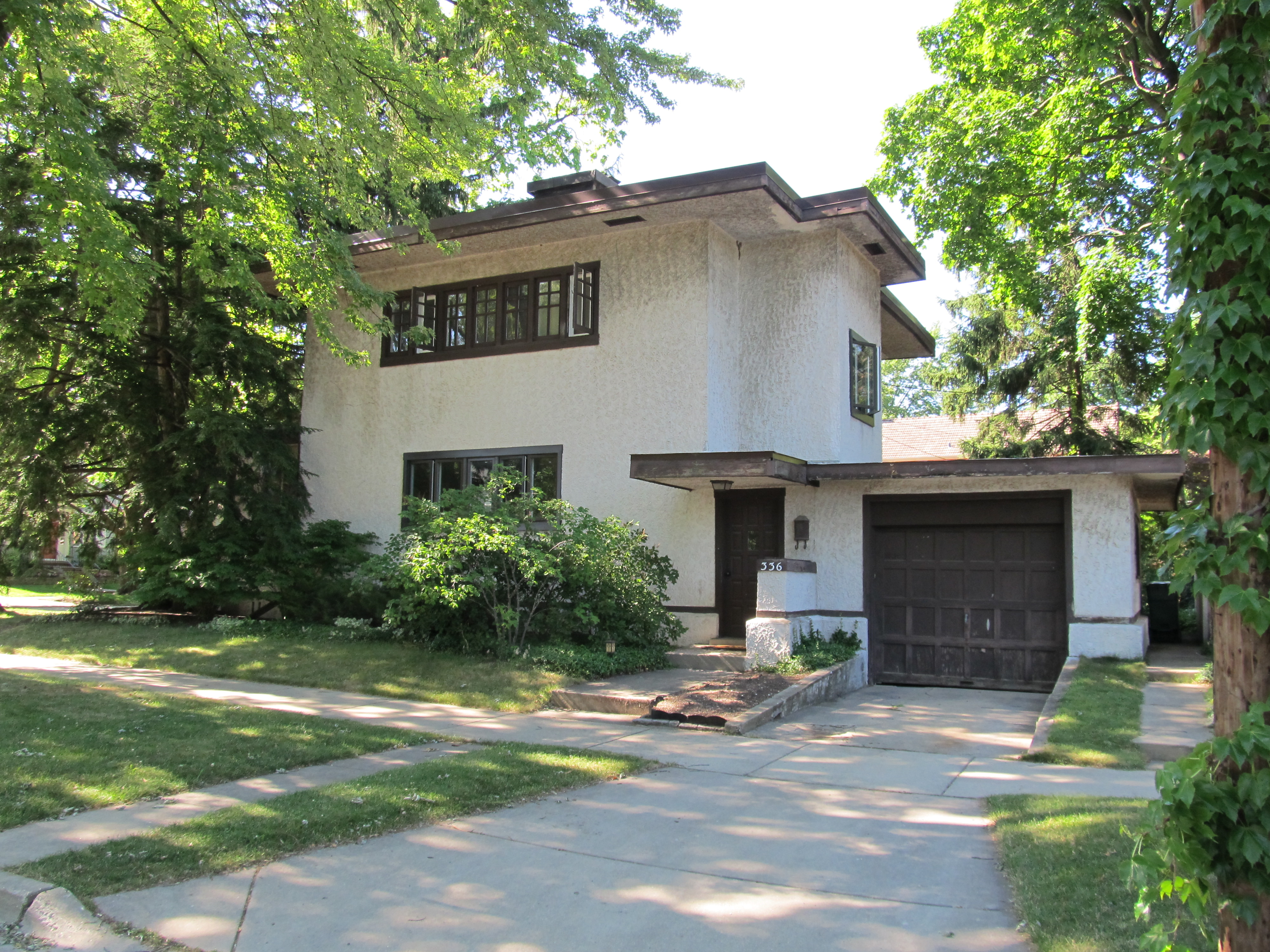
The Thomas E. Sullivan House

In 2008, Wright scholar, William Allin Storrer unveiled his controversial 29 "undiscovered" Frank Lloyd Wright works. One of these houses was the Thomas E. Sullivan House at 336 Gregory Avenue in Wilmette, Illinois, next door to the Burleigh House at 330 Gregory Ave. In 1989, Storrer had previously identified the 1916 house as the work of John S. Van Bergen, though the residence does not appear in Martin Hackl's catalog, The Works of John S. Van Bergen, Architect. Storrer revised his claim, stating that the Sullivan House was actually an American System-Built Home with a dining room addition by Van Bergen. Excluding the alleged addition, the main block of the Sullivan House is nearly identical to that of the Wynant House; only the entrance and garage orientation, a missing bedroom above the garage, and differences in trim details distinguish these two residences. Storrer's assertion is substantiated by a drawing from the Frank Lloyd Wright Foundation which shows Model D-101 with the Sullivan House entrance and without the Wynant House garage wing.

Storrer also identified three potential single-story American System-Built Homes in Berwyn, Illinois. One, the Chester Bragg House (1916), is located at the 6644 34th Street at the corner of Wesley Avenue and has a Model B1 plan.

== See also ==
- List of Frank Lloyd Wright works
- National Register of Historic Places listings in Milwaukee County, Wisconsin
- List of Chicago Landmarks
