= Frank and Jane Isermann House =

Historic house in Wisconsin, United States

- U.S. National Register of Historic Places
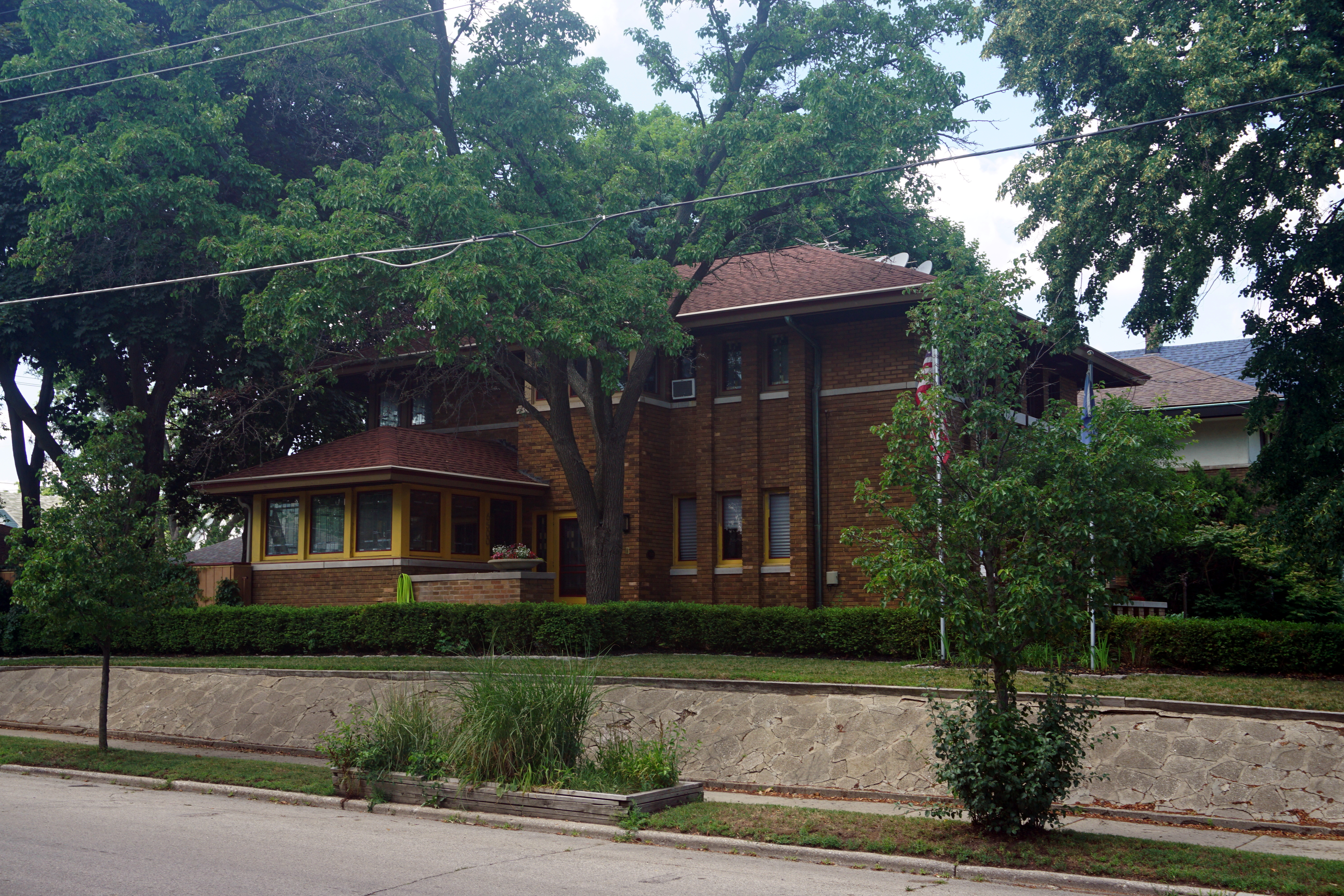

- Location within Wisconsin Location within the United States
- Location: 6500 Seventh Ave. Kenosha, Wisconsin
- Coordinates: 42°34′33″N 87°49′8″W
- Built: 1923
- Architect: Russell Barr Williamson
- Architectural style: Prairie School
- NRHP reference No.: 04000107
- Added to NRHP: February 25, 2004

The Frank and Jane Isermann House is located in Kenosha, Wisconsin, United States. It was added to the National Register of Historic Places in 2004.

== History ==
The Frank and Jane Isermann House was built in 1923 in Kenosha, Wisconsin. Isermann was an executive with the Isermann Clothing Store, which had been established in 1892 and remained in business for almost 50 years. The house was designed by Russell Barr Williamson, who worked for Frank Lloyd Wright from 1914-1917 as a draftsperson and site supervisor, often for projects in and around Milwaukee. The house was passed to Donald and Elsie Isermann, also involved with the store, in the 1950s. They lived here until the 1980s. The house neighbors the Anthony and Caroline Isermann House, which belonged to Anthony's brother and almost certainly inspired Frank and Jane Isermann to commission Williamson for their own house. Together with his brother's residence, the house was recognized by the National Park Service with a listing on the National Register of Historic Places on February 25, 2004.

The two-story house features many details common to the Prairie School. It has a low-pitched hipped roof with wide, overhanging eaves. The house has a one-story sun room on the southwest corner. A two-story bay projects from the south wall of the house and connects to the sun room. The walls of the main house are faced with brown brick and decorated with piers between windows. Windows are also decorated with a stone lintels and a stone belt course. A broken brick wall with a stucco ledge projects from the house. The interior has built-in shelves and wood trim.
