= Wilbur Wynant House =

Historic house in Indiana, United States

- Formerly listed on the U.S. National Register of Historic Places
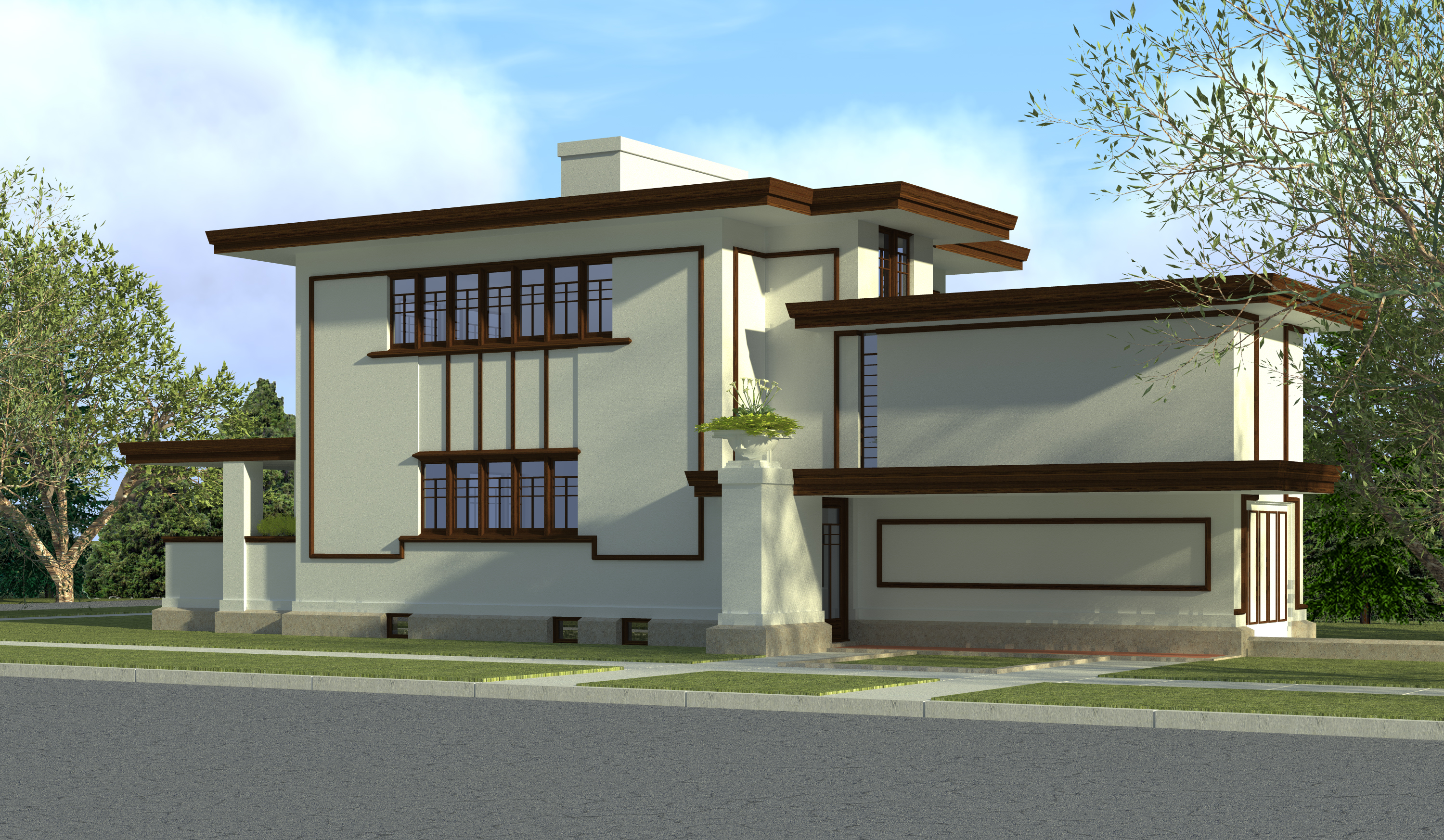
- Digital reconstruction of the Wynant House viewed from the northwest; main entrance is at center

- Location within Indiana Location within the United States
- Location: 600 Fillmore St., Gary, Indiana
- Coordinates: 41°36′0″N 87°21′5″W
- Area: Less than 1 acre (0.40 ha)
- Built: 1916
- Architect: Frank Lloyd Wright; Ingwalk Moe
- Architectural style: Prairie School
- NRHP reference No.: 02001168

Significant dates
- Added to NRHP: October 18, 2002
- Removed from NRHP: December 15, 2011

The Wilbur Wynant House (also known as 600 Fillmore or simply the Wynant House) was a house designed by architect Frank Lloyd Wright in Gary, Indiana, United States. During the end of the house's lifespan it was in poor condition; in the mid-2000s it was purchased by a man who planned to restore it, but it was destroyed by fire on January 9, 2006.

== Fire ==
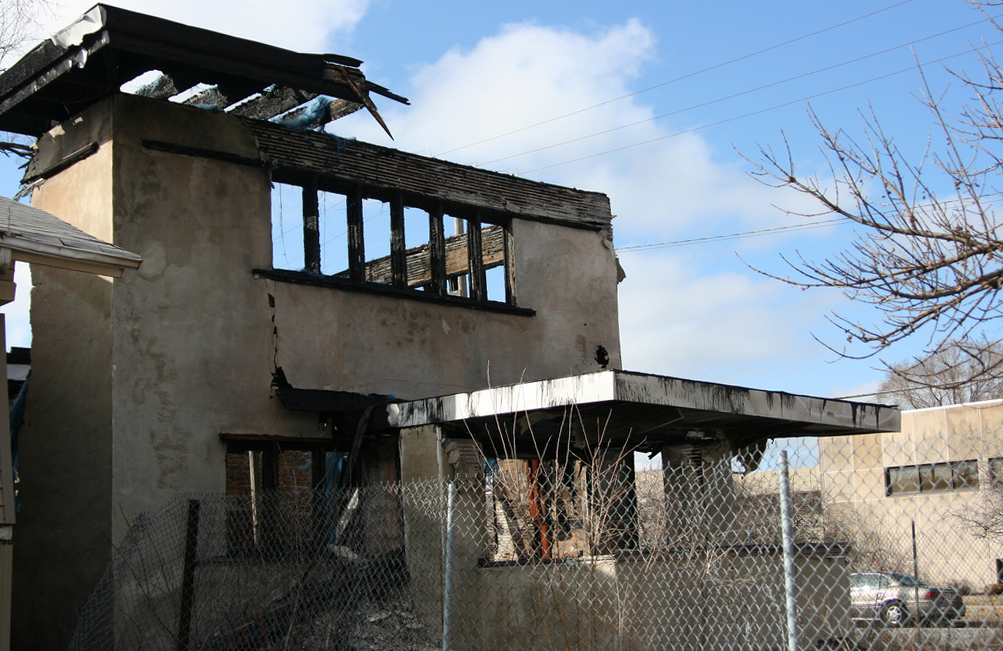
East face of house in early 2009.

On January 9, 2006, the Wynant House burned. Officials suspect arson as the cause of this unexpected fire. The remaining structure was subsequently razed and the lot was confirmed to be vacant in November 2012.

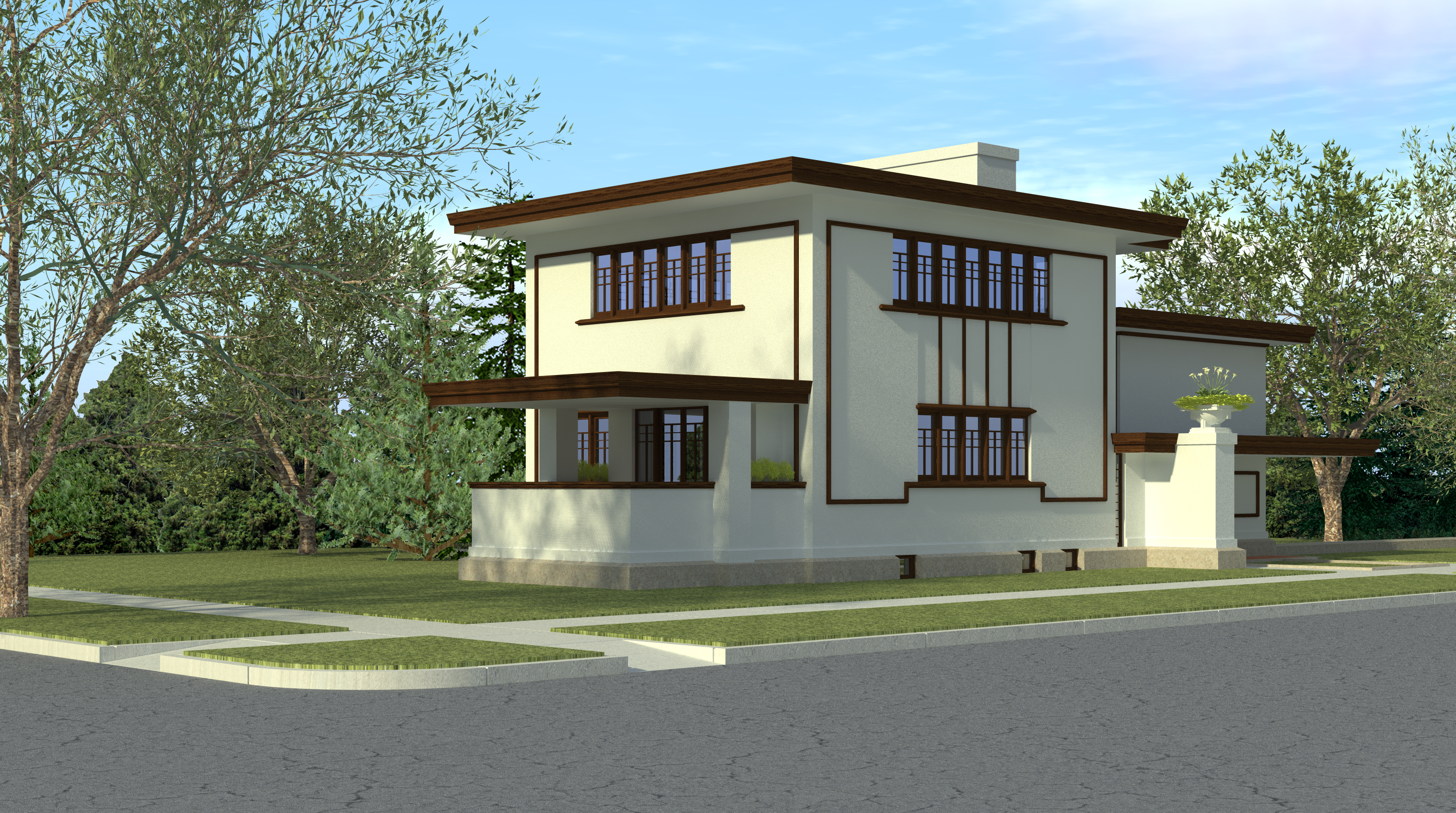
Digital reconstruction viewed from the street corner.

== See also ==
- List of Frank Lloyd Wright works
