= List of Rollins College alumni =

This is a list of notable alumni who graduated and attended Rollins College.

RC=Rollins College
CB=Crummer Graduate School of Business
HH=Hamilton Holt School

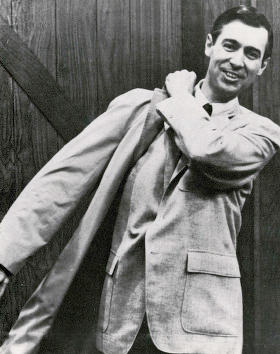
Fred Rogers, known for Mister Rogers' Neighborhood

Alumni	Notability
F. Duane Ackerman RC '64, CB '70	Chairman and CEO, BellSouth
Pauline Betz Addie RC '43	Professional tennis player
Kristen Arnett	Writer and New York Times best-selling novelist
Rex Beach RC (1894-1896)	Novelist
Amanda Bearse	Actress, best known for her role as Marcy on the television sitcom Married... with Children
Clay Bellinger RC (1987-1989)	Former New York Yankee outfielder, played in 1999 World Series
Jane Blalock RC '67	Professional golfer
Eric Bolling RC '84	Financial news television personality
Lorenzo Borghese RC '95	Reality television star on ABC's The Bachelor
Jim Bowden	Professional baseball general manager
Larry Burkett	Financial radio show host
John Castino	Former first baseman and Rookie of the Year for the Minnesota Twins
Jane Chambers RC (1954-1956)	Feminist writer and playwright
Dorothy Cheney RC '45	Professional tennis player
Ellie Cornell	Actress, Halloween 4, Halloween 5
Leanza Cornett	Miss America 1993; former co-host of Entertainment Tonight
Donald J. Cram RC '41	1987 Nobel Prize winner for chemistry
JC Crissey CB '90	British-American film producer, academic
Meg Crofton	President of the Walt Disney Parks & Resorts
Dorothy Cullman	Television producer and philanthropist
Philip Cummings, RC '29	Language teacher, then political analyst and lecturer
Olcott Deming	Former U.S. ambassador to Uganda
Jonathan Dunn-Rankin BA	Actor, television journalist, gay activist
Alice Dye RC '48	Amateur golfer, ASGCA golf course architect and member of the Indiana GA and FSGA Hall of Fames
Pete Dye	Amateur golfer, ASGCA golf course architect, recipient of the PGA Tour Lifetime Achievement Award and World Golf Hall of Fame member
Buddy Ebsen	Actor, best known for his work in Breakfast at Tiffany's and The Beverly Hillbillies
Gigi Fernández CB (2009 or 2010)	Professional tennis player
Christopher Fitzgerald RC 1995	Actor (Broadway musicals Wicked, Young Frankenstein)
Wayland Flowers	Puppeteer and comedian
Muriel Fox	Women's rights activist, co-founder of the National Organization for Women
Shirley Fry Irvin RC 1949	Professional tennis player
Rahul Gandhi	Indian politician
Stephanie Glance RC '85	Head coach for Columbia University women's basketball team
Joel Greenberg	Former politician and former tax collector of Seminole County, Florida
Donald C. Griffin	Physicist, elected fellow of the American Physical Society, and faculty member from 1970 to 2009
Greg Hahn	Standup comedian
Ryan Hanigan	Catcher for the Boston Red Sox of Major League Baseball
Janis Hirsch RC '72	Co-executive producer and writer for series The Nanny and Will & Grace; writer for series Frasier
Glenda Hood	Former mayor of Orlando, Florida (1992–2003); secretary of state of Florida (2003–2005)
Eddie Huang	Restaurateur, food personality, author and former attorney
Dana Ivey RC '63	Actress (films The Color Purple, The Help, Home Alone 2: Lost in New York)
Chris Kahl	Singer known for his songs about Florida
Chris Kirkpatrick	Actor and musician, best known as a member of 'N Sync
Jack Kramer	Professional tennis player
Kalee Kreider	American public affairs and environmental adviser
Robert Lado	Linguist and educational leader
Wendy Schaetzel Lesko	Expert on youth, executive director of the Youth Activism Project
Bob Lewis RC '67	Amateur golfer and RC Sports Hall of Fame in 1986
Brad Linaweaver MFA	Science fiction writer, film producer and screenwriter, magazine publisher
Deanna Lund	Television and film actress (series Land of the Giants)
Barbara McIntire	Amateur golfer
George E. Merrick	Planner of the city of Coral Gables, Florida and one of the founders of the University of Miami
Eleanor Morse RC '37	Philanthropist, co-founder of the Salvador Dalí Museum in St. Petersburg, Florida
Mike Nicolette RC '78	Professional golfer
Elin Nordegren HH '14	Swedish model and former wife of professional golfer Tiger Woods, gave 2014 commencement address
Michael Nouri	Actor, best known for his role in Flashdance
Steve O'Donnell	President of NASCAR
Rob Oppenheim	Professional golfer
Deborah J. Palfrey	Former madam known as the "D.C. Madam" by the media
Chauncey Parker	New York State government official
Bill Peck RC	Guitarist from Orlando, Florida who has performed and toured with other musicians like Mark Tremonti and Michael Angelo Batio
Robert Newton Peck RC '53	Author of children's literature
Anthony Perkins	Actor, best known for his role as Norman Bates in Alfred Hitchcock's Psycho
Betty Rosenquest Pratt RC '47	Professional tennis player
Michael K. Randolph	Chief justice of the Mississippi Supreme Court
John Reardon '52	Baritone singer and actor, best known for his work with fellow Rollins classmate Fred Rogers on Mister Rogers' Neighborhood
Scott Reiniger	Actor, best known for his work in the original Dawn of the Dead
Fred Rogers RC '51	Creator and host of Mister Rogers' Neighborhood
Chris Russo RC '82	Sports radio and television host, most notably on New York's WFAN
Deanna Russo RC '02	Actress, co-star of USA Network drama series Satisfaction
Libby Schaaf RC 1987	Mayor of Oakland, California
Ted Schroeder	Professional tennis player
Matthew H. Smith	Member of the Pennsylvania House of Representatives
Richard V. Spencer '76	76th Secretary of the Navy
Karen Steele	Actress, film Marty
Marlene Streit RC '56	Amateur golfer and member of the World Golf Hall of Fame
Hal Suit	Television broadcaster and Georgia politician
John H. Sykes	Businessman
Lew Temple RC '85	Actor (films Waitress, Domino, The Texas Chainsaw Massacre: The Beginning), former baseball player and scout
Fred Toettcher	Radio personality, host of The Toucher and Hardy Show
Matthew Tonner	Musician, founding member and producer of The 502s and Laney Jones
Ralph Twitchell	Architect, considered the "grandfather" of the Sarasota School of Architecture
Cornelia Wallace	Former First Lady of Alabama; wife of U.S. presidential candidate George Wallace
Al Weiss CB '81	President of Worldwide Operations for Walt Disney Parks & Resorts
Terrie Wood	Republican member of the Connecticut House of Representatives representing Darien
