= Hubbard Park =

Hubbard Park may refer to:

- Hubbard Park (Meriden, Connecticut), which extends into adjacent town Southington, and is listed on the National Register of Historic Places (NRHP) in Connecticut
- Hubbard Park (Sioux City, Iowa), listed on the NRHP in Iowa
- Hubbard Park of Cambridge, Massachusetts, included in Hubbard Park Historic District
- Hubbard Park (Montpelier, Vermont), where Montpelier High School cross-country team practices
- Hubbard Park (Shorewood, Wisconsin), listed as a Milwaukee County Historical Society landmark
