= Shorewood, Wisconsin =

Village in Milwaukee County, Wisconsin

- Village
- The Shorewood Village Hall

- Location of Shorewood in Milwaukee County, Wisconsin.
- Coordinates: 43°5′31″N 87°53′11″W
- Country: United States
- State: Wisconsin
- County: Milwaukee

Area
  - Total: 1.59 sq mi (4.12 km^{2})
  - Land: 1.59 sq mi (4.12 km^{2})
  - Water: 0 sq mi (0.00 km^{2})
- Elevation: 679 ft (207 m)

Population (2020)
  - Total: 13,859
  - Density: 8,700/sq mi (3,350/km^{2})
- Time zone: UTC-6 (Central (CST))
  - Summer (DST): UTC-5 (CDT)
- Area code: 414
- FIPS code: 55-73725
- GNIS feature ID: 1574071
- Website: villageofshorewood.org

Shorewood is a village in Milwaukee County, Wisconsin, United States. A suburb of Milwaukee, it is part of the Milwaukee metropolitan area. The population was 13,859 at the 2020 census.

== History ==
In the early 19th century when the first white settlers arrived, the Shorewood area was controlled by Native Americans, including the Menominee, Potawatomi, and Sauk people. The United States Federal Government traded the land from the Menominee people in 1832 through the Treaty of Washington.

The land was organized as part of the Town of Milwaukee in 1835, and when settlers arrived in the mid-1830s, they found the area to be heavily forested. They built two sawmills on the east bank of the Milwaukee River, and the unincorporated community around the sawmills was known as Mechanicsville. However, the mills' success was short-lived; both closed during the Panic of 1837. Thomas Bare, the area's first permanent white settler, arrived in 1841 and purchased ninety acres of farmland east of the Milwaukee River. Around 1850, another unincorporated community known as Humboldt was settled in the area. Humboldt's industrial base included a paper mill and a grist mill.

Beginning in the 1870s, the area's economy began to diversify. In 1873, the Northwestern Union Railway laid tracks through present-day Shorewood along the eastern bank of the Milwaukee River. The railroad was a boon for local businesses, including the Milwaukee Cement Company, which began quarrying limestone on the bluffs above the river in 1876. The community that grew around the company was known as Cementville and prospered until quarrying operations ceased in 1909.

In 1872, a resort called Lueddemann's-on-the-River opened in the southwestern part of present-day Shorewood. Accessible by riverboat and later by train, the resort was the first of several beer gardens and amusement parks that operated in the area between the 1872 and 1916. Coney Island, an amusement park that opened in 1900, proved to be particularly controversial and played a significant role in Shorewood's incorporation as a village. The park included loud music, electric lights, and a roller coaster. Some town residents were opposed to the noise, light pollution, and raucous visitors coming from the City of Milwaukee on the newly constructed Milwaukee Electric Railway streetcar lines. Some blamed the Town of Milwaukee, which collected licensing fees from the park and allowed it to operate. Additionally, the roads in the community were of poor quality compared with those in the neighboring city of Milwaukee, and residents were unhappy that tax revenue from the increasingly suburban Shorewood area—including the taxes from Coney Island—were being redistributed across the town rather than being used to increase their standard of living. In response, residents voted to incorporate as the Village of East Milwaukee. At the time of incorporation in August 1900, the village had a population of 300.

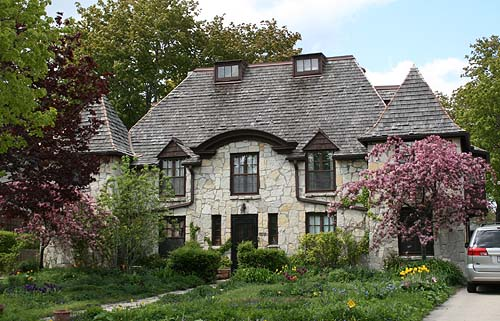
The NRHP-listed Thomas Bossert House is one of several Flagg-system houses in Shorewood that date to the mid-1920s.

In the early 1900s, the village developed as a streetcar suburb of Milwaukee, with public transportation allowing residents to easily commute to the city. The village's center emerged along the streetcar lines on Oakland Avenue and Atwater Road (now known as Capitol Drive). Additionally, affluent Milwaukeeans began building mansions in the eastern part of the village along Lake Drive and the bluff overlooking Lake Michigan. The population grew to 1,255 by 1913, and in the 1910s municipal improvements included paved roads and sidewalks, gas mains, and street signs. The Village of East Milwaukee changed its name to the Village of Shorewood in 1917.

Shorewood saw significant growth in the 1920s, with the population quadrupling from 2,650 residents in 1920 to 13,479 in 1930. During the decade, as many as 200 new homes were constructed per year in the village, including work by Alexander C. Eschweiler and Flagg-system homes constructed by Arnold F. Meyer & Co. The architect Russell Barr Williamson, who worked for Frank Lloyd Wright from 1914 to 1917, designed at least 16 homes in Shorewood between 1918 and 1929. As the village population swelled, local municipal institutions became more organized. The village's health department organized in 1918; the police department, in 1920; and the fire department, in 1929. In 1928, the village's elected board of trustees hired a full-time village manager to head the village's day-to-day operations, and Shorewood has had a council–manager government ever since. Shorewood's school district also grew in the 1920s and was influenced by the ideas of philosopher John Dewey.

The village's historical population reached its zenith after World War II, with over 16,000 residents. The community underwent urban renewal projects beginning in the 1960s, but the population has slowly declined to approximately 13,000 as of 2010.

== Geography ==
Shorewood is located at 43°05′31″N 87°53′11″W (43.092061, −87.886333).

Nestled between the Milwaukee River and Lake Michigan, Shorewood is bordered by the City of Milwaukee to the south and west and Whitefish Bay to the north. According to the United States Census Bureau, the village has a total area of 1.59 square miles (4.12 km^{2}), all land.

Shorewood's border to the west stops at the Milwaukee River's edge, according to the Village Charter, unlike most river municipal boundaries that are set at the middle of the river.

== Demographics ==
Historical population
Census	Pop.	Note	%±
1910	707		—
1920	2,650		274.8%
1930	13,479		408.6%
1940	15,184		12.6%
1950	16,199		6.7%
1960	15,990		−1.3%
1970	15,576		−2.6%
1980	14,327		−8.0%
1990	14,116		−1.5%
2000	13,763		−2.5%
2010	13,162		−4.4%
2020	13,859		5.3%
U.S. Decennial Census

=== 2020 census ===
As of the 2020 census, Shorewood had a population of 13,859. The population density was 8,716.4 inhabitants per square mile (3,365.4/km^{2}). The median age was 38.3 years. 20.0% of residents were under the age of 18 and 17.8% of residents were 65 years of age or older. For every 100 females there were 86.3 males, and for every 100 females age 18 and over there were 82.8 males age 18 and over.

100.0% of residents lived in urban areas, while 0.0% lived in rural areas.

There were 6,635 households in Shorewood, of which 25.0% had children under the age of 18 living in them. Of all households, 39.9% were married-couple households, 19.2% were households with a male householder and no spouse or partner present, and 34.0% were households with a female householder and no spouse or partner present. About 39.2% of all households were made up of individuals and 15.3% had someone living alone who was 65 years of age or older.

There were 7,096 housing units, of which 6.5% were vacant. The homeowner vacancy rate was 0.4% and the rental vacancy rate was 5.3%.

Racial composition as of the 2020 census
Race	Number	Percent
White	11,143	80.4%
Black or African American	582	4.2%
American Indian and Alaska Native	30	0.2%
Asian	859	6.2%
Native Hawaiian and Other Pacific Islander	2	0.0%
Some other race	169	1.2%
Two or more races	1,074	7.7%
Hispanic or Latino (of any race)	754	5.4%

=== 2010 census ===
As of the census of 2010, there were 13,162 people, 6,381 households, and 3,109 families living in the village. The population density was 8,278.0 inhabitants per square mile (3,196.2/km^{2}). There were 6,750 housing units at an average density of 4,245.3 per square mile (1,639.1/km^{2}). The racial makeup of the village was 88.1% White, 2.9% African American, 0.2% Native American, 5.6% Asian, 0.8% from other races, and 2.3% from two or more races. Hispanic or Latino of any race were 3.4% of the population.

There were 6,381 households, of which 23.2% had children under the age of 18 living with them, 38.0% were married couples living together, 7.6% had a female householder with no husband present, 3.0% had a male householder with no wife present, and 51.3% were non-families. 39.0% of all households were made up of individuals, and 11.5% had someone living alone who was 65 years of age or older. The average household size was 2.06 and the average family size was 2.83.

The median age in the village was 37.2 years. 19.2% of residents were under the age of 18; 13% were between the ages of 18 and 24; 28% were from 25 to 44; 26.6% were from 45 to 64; and 13% were 65 years of age or older. The gender makeup of the village was 46.8% male and 53.2% female.

=== 2000 census ===
As of the census of 2000, there were 13,763 people, 6,539 households, and 3,328 families living in the village. The population density was 8,599.5 people per square mile (3,321.2/km^{2}), the highest in the state of Wisconsin. There were 6,696 housing units at an average density of 4,183.9 per square mile (1,615.8/km^{2}). The racial makeup of the village was 91.43% White, 2.41% African American, 0.23% Native American, 3.19% Asian, 0.04% Pacific Islander, 0.84% from other races, and 1.85% from two or more races. Hispanic or Latino of any race were 2.51% of the population.

There were 6,539 households, out of which 25.3% had children under the age of 18 living with them, 40.8% were married couples living together, 7.9% had a female householder with no husband present, and 49.1% were non-families. 39.5% of all households were made up of individuals, and 12.3% had someone living alone who was 65 years of age or older. The average household size was 2.08 and the average family size was 2.87.

In the village, the population was spread out, with 21.0% under the age of 18, 8.4% from 18 to 24, 31.8% from 25 to 44, 24.3% from 45 to 64, and 14.5% who were 65 years of age or older. The median age was 38 years. For every 100 females, there were 85.1 males. For every 100 females age 18 and over, there were 80.4 males.

The median income for a household in the village was $47,224, and the median income for a family was $67,589. Males had a median income of $47,616 versus $34,294 for females. The per capita income for the village was $32,950. About 3.8% of families and 6.7% of the population were below the poverty line, including 3.5% of those under age 18 and 7.5% of those age 65 or over.

== Education ==
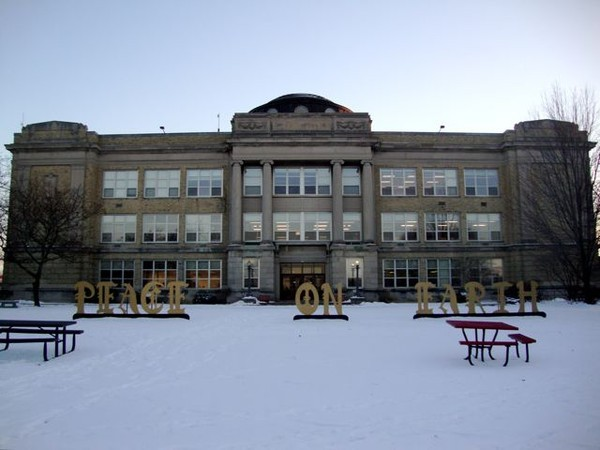
The first building of Shorewood High School's multi-building campus was constructed in 1925.

The Shorewood School District, which covers the municipality, maintains four public schools:

- Shorewood High School – serving grades 9 through 12
- Shorewood Intermediate School – serving grades 7 and 8
- Atwater Elementary School – serving 4K through grade 6
- Lake Bluff Elementary School – serving 4K through grade 6

The Archdiocese of Milwaukee maintains one Catholic school in Shorewood, St. Robert School, which serves kindergarten through grade 8.

== Landmarks and notable buildings ==
- Benjamin Church House (also known as Kilbourntown House) – The one-story Greek Revival house was built in 1844 for his family by Benjamin F. Church, a pioneer builder from New York, on N. Fourth Street in the Kilbourntown settlement. In 1938, after significant preservation efforts, the house was moved from its original site to its present location in Estabrook Park in Shorewood. The house was added to the National Register of Historic Places in 1976.
- Estabrook Park – A park with pond, soccer fields, dog park, softball diamond, beach volleyball court, picnic areas, skate park, and wooded areas spanning almost 125 acres (51 ha) along the east bank of the Milwaukee River between E Capitol Dr. and Hampton Ave.
- Hubbard Park – The wooded, terraced park spanning almost 5 acres (2.0 ha) along the east bank of the Milwaukee River has a colorful history. In its earlier years, the site was indigenous hunting grounds, a resort, a series of amusement parks, fishing shanties, to name a few. It is home to the Hubbard Park Lodge, constructed as a WPA project in 1936. It is also home to Hubbard Park Lodge Restaurant.
- Shorewood High School campus – The school's 19-acre (7.7 ha) campus, built between 1924 and 1938, includes separate buildings for administration, physical education, arts and science, industrial arts, and theater arts. The auditorium was modeled after the RKO Theater in New York City.
- Shorewood Village Hall – Originally built as a four-room schoolhouse in 1908, the building was purchased in 1916 by the Village of East Milwaukee for use as a village hall. It was extensively remodeled in 1937 with WPA funds, and again in 1985. The building was added to the National Register of Historic Places in 1984.
- WITI TV Tower – Built in 1962, it was once one of the tallest free-standing lattice towers in the world, rising 1,078 feet (329 m).
- Hayek Pharmacy – Located at 4001 N. Downer Ave, the original interior of the pharmacy was featured on the cover of the Images of America book on Shorewood's historic buildings. It is one of the oldest retail buildings in Shorewood, dating back to the turn of the 20th century. Hayek Pharmacy was shut down in January 2018 after 100 years in business.
- The Ghost Train – The Ghost Train is an artistic sensory experience at the Oak Leaf Trail Bridge and Capitol Drive in Shorewood. It made its inaugural run on October 31, 2016.
- The Elizabeth Murphy House, designed by architect Frank Lloyd Wright, is the last completed home in his American System-Built Homes series. The home was built in 1917–18. Its pedigree was lost when its architect was left off an estate sale advertisement in 1993 but was rediscovered in 2015 and has since been restored by new owners.
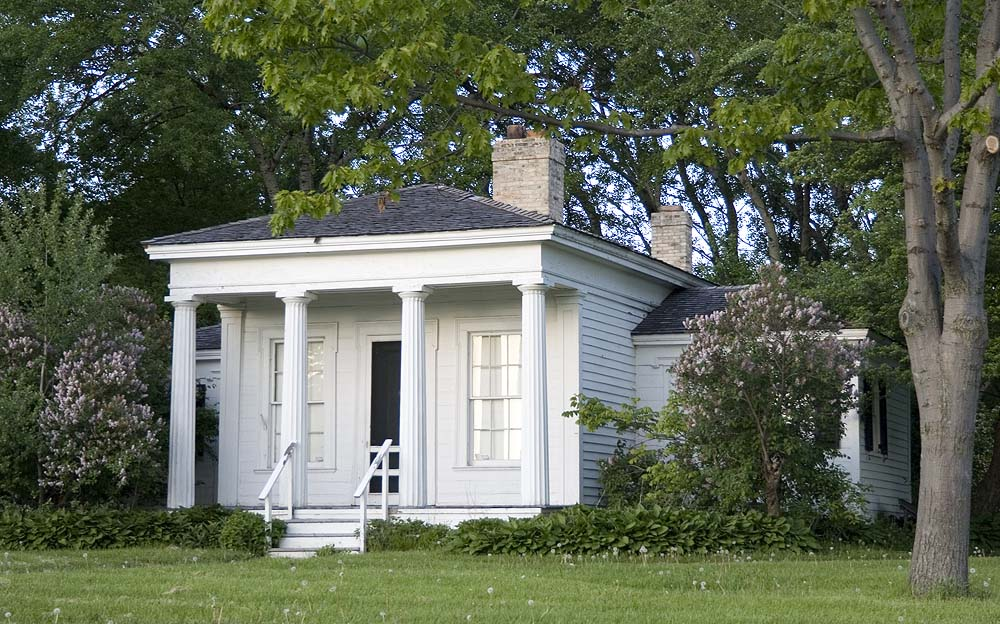
Benjamin Church House

Atwater Park

Atwater Beach

== Notable people ==
- Frankie Abernathy, reality TV star
- Les Aspin, U.S. House of Representatives (1971–1993), U.S. Secretary of Defense (1993–1994)
- Kate Baldwin, Broadway actress, 2010 Tony Award nominee for Best Performance by a Leading Actress in a Musical for Finian's Rainbow
- Louis Bennett II, soccer player
- Bill Carollo, NFL referee
- Dickey Chapelle, photojournalist and first female war correspondent
- Katie Eder, activist and social entrepreneur, founder of 50 Miles More, Kids Tales, and The Future Coalition
- John Fiedler (1925–2005), voice actor and character actor in stage, film, television, and radio; voice of Piglet in Disney's Winnie the Pooh productions, played role of Mr. Peterson, nervous patient on The Bob Newhart Show
- Paul C. Gartzke, Presiding Judge of the Wisconsin Court of Appeals
- Herschel Burke Gilbert, film and television composer
- Jerry Harrison, keyboardist for Talking Heads and The Modern Lovers
- Walter Heller, economic adviser to Presidents Lyndon B. Johnson and John F. Kennedy
- Kirby Hendee, Wisconsin State Senator
- Ari Herstand, singer/songwriter, now based out of L.A.
- Robert Watson Landry, Wisconsin State Representative
- Stephen R. Leopold, Wisconsin State Representative
- Jack Nagle, NBA scout
- Betty Jo Nelsen, Wisconsin State Representative
- Pat Peppler, NFL general manager and head coach
- Charlotte Rae, actress on The Facts of Life, 1944 graduate of Shorewood High School
- William Rehnquist, U.S. Supreme Court Chief Justice, 1941 graduate of Shorewood High School
- Ben L. Salomon, recipient of World War II Medal of Honor
- Jim Sensenbrenner, U.S. Representative
- Leif Shiras, professional tennis player
- Matthew Tonner, multi-instrumental musician and producer of The 502s
- Judy Tyler, actress
- Jerry Zucker, David Zucker, and Jim Abrahams – co-directors of movies Airplane! and Top Secret! grew up in Shorewood; the bogus East German national anthem sung in Top Secret! is actually the Shorewood High School fight song with comic lyrics
