= Ari Herstand =

American singer-songwriter (born 1985)

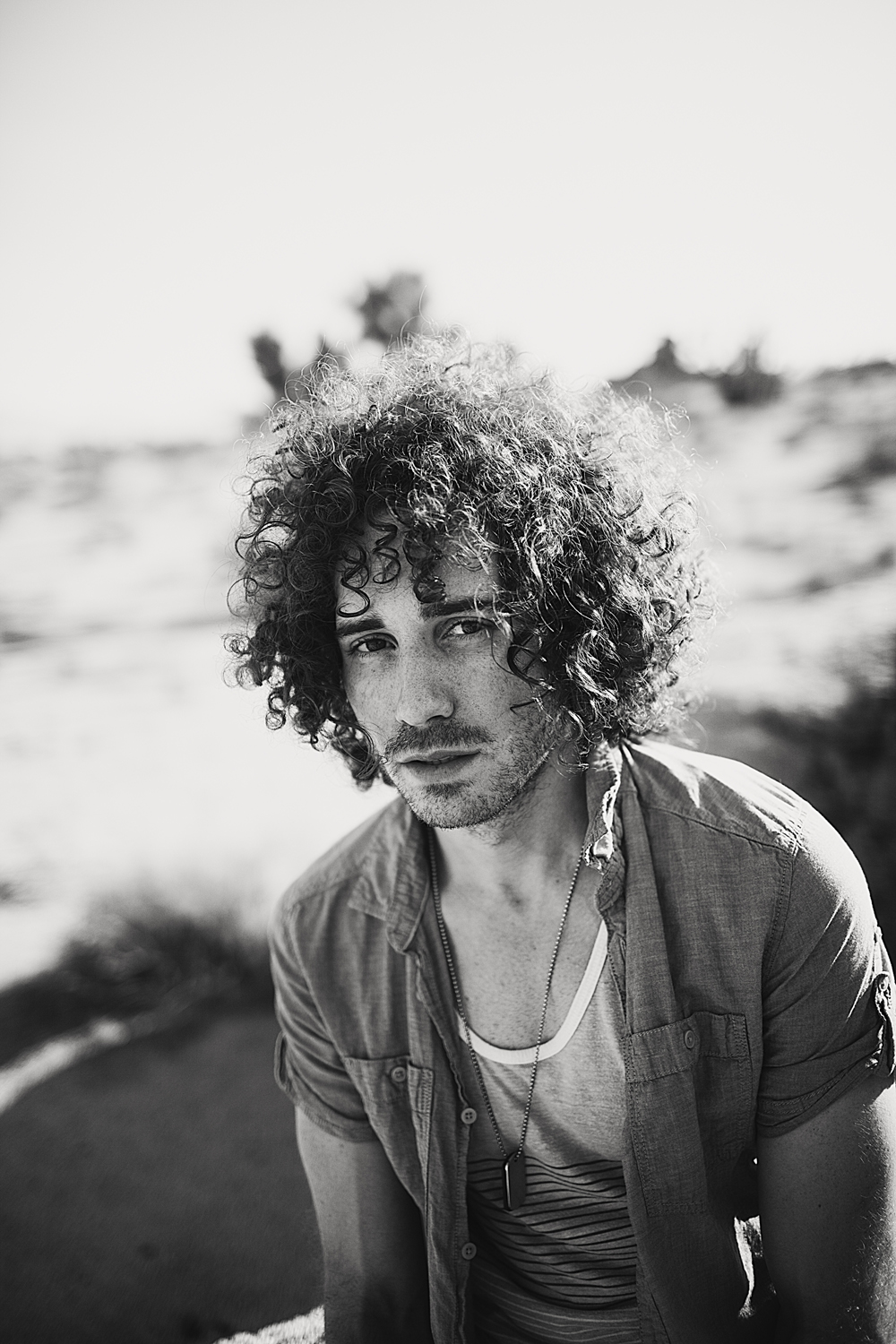
- Ari Herstand in Joshua Tree in 2013

Background information
- Born: Ari Seth Herstand; June 1, 1985 (age 41)
- Origin: Minneapolis, Minnesota, United States
- Genres: Rock; Pop; Folk; Funk
- Occupations: Singer-songwriter author actor music industry blogger
- Instruments: Vocals; Guitar; Piano; Trumpet; Beat Boxing; Boss RC 50 Loop Station
- Labels: Ari's Take, Inc
- Website: http://www.AriHerstand.com

Ari Seth Herstand (born June 1, 1985) is an American musician, songwriter, author, actor, blogger based in Los Angeles, California (previously Minneapolis, Minnesota). He is the CEO and founder of the music business education and artist advocacy company Ari's Take.

Herstand has played at Summerfest in Milwaukee, WI and the South by Southwest music festival in Austin, TX, as well as Carnegie Hall. He has played with various artists including Milk Carton Kids, Phil Vassar, Matt Nathanson, Joshua Radin, Eric Hutchinson, and Ron Pope. He has received airplay on NPR's program All Things Considered and Cities 97.

He is known on television for his roles in Transparent, Aquarius, Mad Men, 2 Broke Girls, Touch, The Fosters, and Sam & Cat.

He is the author of How To Make It in the New Music Business: Practical Tips on Building a Loyal Following and Making a Living as a Musician (Liveright).

Herstand runs the podcast The New Music Business with Ari Herstand, in which he interviews musicians and music-industry professionals. It won the 2021 Webby Award for Best Music Podcast.

He is also currently a columnist for Variety.

== Background ==
Ari Herstand grew up in both Madison and Shorewood, Wisconsin. He is self-taught on the piano and began playing guitar at 14. He picked up the trumpet in fifth grade.

Herstand briefly studied music education at the University of Minnesota - Twin Cities. In 2004, he transferred to McNally Smith College of Music (MusicTech at the time) in St. Paul and began his career as a singer-songwriter. While a student, he played coffee shops and club shows extensively at and around the University of Minnesota, usually with cellist Lucas Shogren. Through grassroots promotion and a buzz generated from live performances on the UMN campus, Herstand gained local popularity.

Herstand's music gained wider acclaim in 2006 when his songs were played on The Real World. and then again in 2010 on One Tree Hill. He performed at the South by Southwest Music festival in Austin, Texas, in 2006 and 2007 and was a speaker 2015 – 2019. He performed Summerfest in Milwaukee, Wisconsin, and helped book and run the Chipotle Rhythm Kitchen and Tiki Hut stages from 2006 to 2010.

In 2008, Ari Herstand showcased at the NACA (National Association for Campus Activities) Northern Plains region, where he booked more than 50 shows for the 2008–2009 school year. He showcased at NACA Northern Plains region again in 2013 and Nationals in 2014 along with showcasing at various APCA conferences.

Herstand has played the majority of his shows solo. He spent the beginning of 2012 in Minnesota recording his new album with producer Paul Marino, drummer Dave King, bassist Jim Anton, guitarist Jake Hanson, keyboardist Joey Kantor and vocalists Alicia Wiley and Tonia Hughes. He funded this album primarily through a successful Kickstarter campaign. The album was mastered by Bernie Grundman Mastering in September 2012. The album entitled Brave Enough was released at the Hotel Cafe on March 29, 2014, with an eight-piece band.

He released the book How To Make It in the New Music Business: Practical Tips on Building a Loyal Following and Making a Living as a Musician on December 20, 2016, and the second edition on November 5, 2019. It became a #1 best-seller on Amazon in three categories and is being taught by more than 300 universities.

Because of his success as an independent musician, blogger and author, Forbes Magazine called Ari Herstand "the poster child of DIY music."

Herstand recorded his latest album Like Home with producer Justin Glasco from their respective studios while in the COVID-19 pandemic induced quarantine. They used technology like Audiomovers and Zoom to create the album without being able to be in the same physical space. The album was released April 9, 2021, celebrated with a live-streamed, full-band show at the Hotel Cafe in Los Angeles.

In reviewing the album, American Songwriter Magazine cited Herstand as "a commanding performer and a world-class songwriter."

== Ari's Take ==
In Spring 2012, Herstand started the music business blog Ari's Take to help independent musicians build careers without the help of a record label. The blog is based on Herstand's experience as a touring musician (with 700+ shows) as well as his work as an artist manager. Ari's Take articles have been featured on CD Baby, Music Connection, TuneCore, Digital Music News, Roland, American Songwriter, and Hypebot.

Ari's Take is now a music business education company where it is the hub for Ari's Take Academy, where thousands of students take online courses taught by experts in the industry, and the New Music Business podcast with Ari Herstand. Herstand hosts successful music professionals to discuss how they have navigated and succeeded in the new music business. Guests have included Andy Grammer, Zaytoven, Jack Conte and Dina LaPolt

== Author ==
Herstand is the author of How To Make It in the New Music Business: Practical Tips on Building a Loyal Following and Making a Living as a Musician. The foreword to the first and second editions was written by Derek Sivers. The book was initially released on December 20, 2016, and is now in its third edition with Liveright Publishing. Music Connection Magazine reviewed the book and wrote "How to Make It in the New Music Business might well be the best “how to" book of its kind." Rolling Stone wrote about the book: "It's a fun and informative read for every artist out there looking to live off their creative craft. The book does a great job of explaining the process of generating royalties and crowdfunding goals, all while delivering important info in a witty and wise tone that’s comprehensive but never condescending." Andy Grammer said "There is a great divide between what the young musician thinks being a rock star is and what actually working as a musician entails. Ari fills in the blanks with his light hearted yet blunt demeanor. He's the informed older brother most of us never got in this crazy, confusing industry." Derek Sivers said "This is the single best book on the current music business. An absolute must read for every musician." Jack Conte said "Ari is at the front of the front. He gets it. I've read a hundred how-to-make-it-in-the-music-biz books, and this one is today's definitive, comprehensive manual." Peter Hollens said "Ari understands this space. He gives a tremendous amount of information. Anyone wanting to make music for a living should read this, period."

== Brassroots District ==
In 2018, Herstand launched the funk/soul band, Brassroots District. Their first show was at the Teragram Ballroom supporting Lawrence in Los Angeles. Herstand currently fronts the band (under the alias "Copper Jones"). In the summer of 2021, Brassroots District put on a fully immersive funk/soul theatrical concert experience in a parking lot in Downtown Los Angeles with 16 shows spanning 4 weekends. The story chronicled the band's fictitious opening slot for Sly and the Family Stone in the year 1973. Directed by Monica Miklas, script by Daysha Veronica, co-created with Andrew Leib, performing all original songs written by Herstand and Brett Nolan.

== Independent Music Professionals United and AB5 ==
Beginning in November 2019, Herstand worked to "save his industry from detrimental changes" that would be brought about by California bill AB5. AB5 "reclassifies musicians from independent contractors to employees… to hire a musician for a recording session… [a recording artist would have to] become their employer… get worker's comp insurance, unemployment insurance, set up a payroll company." Herstand wrote a blog post that went viral, founded Independent Music Professionals United, gathered 185,000 signatures on a petition, and met with Assemblywoman Lorena Gonzalez and Senate Majority leader Robert Hertzberg. On April 17, a compromise measure was announced to exempt the vast majority of musicians from most provisions of AB5. The bill, AB2257, which Herstand helped write, was signed into law by Governor Gavin Newsom on September 4, 2020.

== UnCancelled Music Festival ==
When the Coronavirus shut down the live music industry, Herstand, along with friends Andrew Leib and Ashley Maietta launched UnCancelled Music Festival. All shows were livestreamed from artists' homes on the platform Stageit where fans had to purchase tickets to attend the performances and could tip the artists during the show. The festival engaged music venues to book talent and curate stages so they could participate in the revenue generated to help keep the businesses afloat during the crisis. Part of the proceeds were donated to the Recording Academy's Emergency Financial Assistance fund MusiCares. The festival featured over 350 artists from around the globe including Colbie Caillat, Betty Who, Josh Radnor, Waxahatchee, Beach Bunny and Snail Mail. The festival organizers look to keep the festival active until live music returns to music venues.

== Discography ==
=== Albums ===
==== Studio releases ====
Released independently:

- Like Home (2021)
- Brave Enough (2014)
- Whispering Endearments (2008)
- Baby Eyes (2005)

==== Live, single and EP releases ====
Released independently:

- Birthday (2021)
- Drifting (2021)
- Like Home (2021)
- Retrospect (2020)
- Take Allotta Sweat (2018) with Brassroots District
- Repetition (2018) with Brassroots District
- Together (2018) with Brassroots District
- Cabarete (2018)
- Clean Up (2011) – Reached No. 11 on iTunes singer-songwriter charts
- Live at The Pause (2010)
- One Take (2007)
