= Crissey =

Crissey is a surname. Notable people with the surname include:

- Forrest Crissey (1864–1943), American novelist and writer
- John Crissey III (born 1965), Anglo-American film producer
- Marie Skodak Crissey (1910–2000), American psychologist
