= Jill Daley =

Scottish broadcaster, model and journalist

- Born: 1976/77
- Occupation: Radio presenter

Jill Daley (born 1976/77) is a Scottish broadcaster, model and journalist who lost her sight at the age of 19 to a condition called diabetic retinopathy. She presents The Daily Lunch, a weekday lunchtime show on Glasgow's Insight Radio, a radio station for visually impaired listeners. Daley worked as a blind adviser for director Eleanor Yule and producer Oscar van Heek for the film Blinded. Yule and van Heek intend to make a film about Daley's life. In November 2014, she appeared in an episode of BBC Radio Scotland's Skin Deep discussing beauty and body image issues for people with sight loss.
