= Crissey (disambiguation) =

Crissey is a surname.

Crissey may also refer to:

- Crissey, Jura, France, a commune
- Crissey, Saône-et-Loire, France, a commune
- Crissey Airport, an abandoned airfield in Crissey Field State Recreation Site, Oregon, United States
