= Matthew Tonner =

American musician

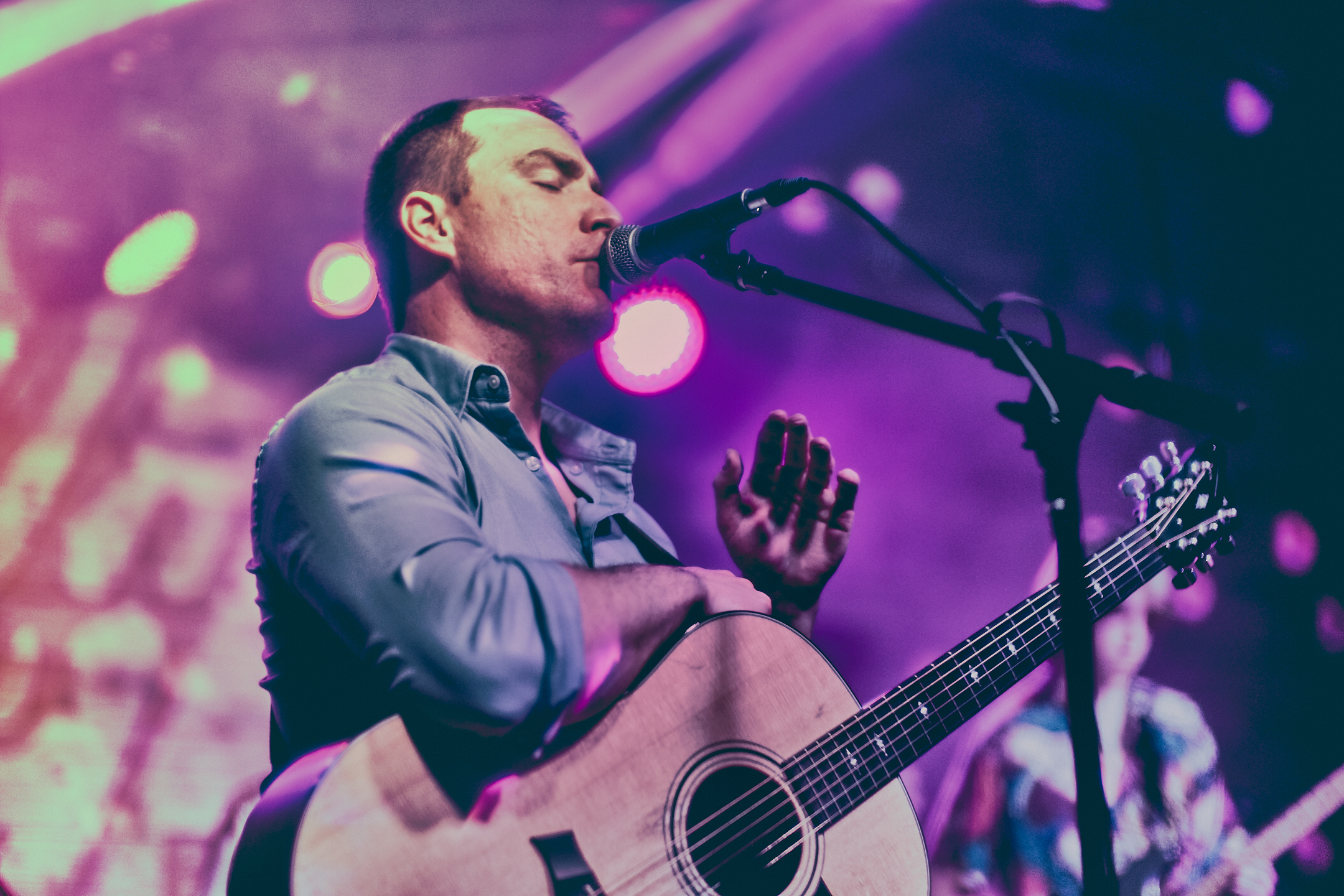

Background information
- Also known as: Tonner
- Born: Shorewood, Wisconsin, U.S.
- Origin: Orlando, Florida, U.S.
- Genres: Indie folk; folk-pop; Americana; indie rock
- Occupations: Singer; songwriter; record producer; multi-instrumentalist
- Instruments: Vocals; guitar; keyboards
- Years active: 2011–present
- Website: www.matthewtonner.com

Matthew Tonner is an American musician and music producer. Tonner is known as a member of Florida-based indie folk band The 502s, producing and performing multiple instruments on their debut album Because We Had To and their breakthrough album Could It Get Better Than This including the band's biggest hit to date "Just a Little While". He is a former member of the electropop duo Destima and of Laney Jones and the Spirits. He is also known for his solo music under the mononym Tonner.

== Biography ==
Tonner was born and raised in Shorewood, Wisconsin. He received a degree in music from Rollins College, where he also met songwriting collaborator Laney Jones. Tonner co-produced and performed on Laney Jones' 2016 self-titled album, which received critical acclaim from Rolling Stone, Paste magazine, and Elmore magazine.

In 2017, Tonner was recruited by The 502s to produce their full-length album “Because We Had To” and joined their live band shortly afterward. The album received critical acclaim from PopMatters and Cowboys and Indians. Also in 2017, Tonner produced the self-titled full-length album for Orlando based folk band Beemo; the lead single from Beemo's album "Did For You" (which featured piano and arrangements from Tonner), later appeared in the 2021 film Red Rocket.

Tonner has continued as an active member of The 502s and produced their follow up album Could It Get Better Than This which included the group’s breakout singles "Magdalene" and "Just A Little While". In a 2024 interview, Tonner cited the album's release during the COVID-19 pandemic as "a big part of what got me through that time."

Reflecting on the group's success in an interview with Forbes at Lollapalooza, Tonner stated "It's just an honor to be on the bill with everybody... our strategy has always been to make songs that we really love and get everybody together and play them live. And ever since we first started doing it... people have always really reacted to it. We started out here in Chicago playing in a living room and now we're at Lollapalooza. So, it's pretty insane."

In 2020, Tonner began releasing music under his own name, culminating in the Whispers in the Dark EP. His debut single “Criminal” was co-produced with Jordan Shih of Orlando electronic band SALES.

In 2022, Tonner released "Suspense", the first single from his upcoming new solo album. In May 2022, Tonner released his next single "Volcano", a song inspired by climate change and the 2021 Gulf of Mexico fires. "Volcano" received critical attention and praise for its melodic songwriting and production. Another single "Castles" was released in July 2022 Tonner also announced the new album will be titled "Walls Come Down", to be released in fall 2022.

== Discography ==
=== with The 502s ===
Title	Album details	Credits
Because We Had To	Release: June 29, 2018; Label: Self-released; Format: Vinyl 12", digital download, CD	Producer; Guitars; Keyboards; Backing Vocals
Could It Get Better Than This	Release: October 15, 2021; Label: Self-released; Format: Vinyl 12", digital download, CD	Producer; Songwriter; Guitars; Keyboards; Backing Vocals
Just Another EP	Release: September 23, 2022; Label: Self-released; Format: digital download, CD	Producer; Songwriter; Guitars; Keyboards; Mandolin; Backing Vocals
Stories To Tell	Release: March 10, 2023; Label: Self-released; Format: digital download, CD	Producer; Songwriter; Guitars; Keyboards; Backing Vocals
Pure Serotonin	Release: August 4, 2023; Label: Self-released; Format: digital download, CD	Producer; Songwriter; Guitars; Keyboards; Backing Vocals
The 502s	Release: April 12, 2024; Label: Mick Music; Format: Vinyl 12", digital download, CD	Producer; Songwriter; Backing Vocals
The 502s Live, 2024	Release: December 13, 2024; Label: Mick Music; Format: Vinyl 12", digital download	Guitars; Keyboards; Backing Vocals

=== as Tonner ===
Title	Album details	Credits
Whispers In The Dark	Release: September 23, 2020; Label: Self-released; Format: digital download	Producer; Songwriter; Guitars; Keyboards; Horns; Vocals
Walls Come Down	Release: April 14, 2023; Label: Self-released; Format: digital download	Producer; Songwriter; Guitars; Keyboards; Horns; Vocals

=== with Laney Jones ===
Title	Album details	Credits
Beyond the Blue	Release: January 1, 2012; Label: Self-released; Format: digital download CD	Producer; Guitars; Backing Vocals
Golden Road	Release: July 12, 2013; Label: Self-released; Format: digital download CD	Producer; Songwriter; Guitars; Keyboards; Backing Vocals
Laney Jones	Release: March 11, 2016; Label: Tone Tree; Format: Vinyl 12", digital download, CD	Executive Producer; Songwriter; Guitars; Keyboards; Clarinet; Backing Vocals
Stories Up High	Release: May 20, 2022; Format: Vinyl 12", digital download, CD	Songwriter ("Secret Weapon")
