= Student activities =

College extracurricular clubs and programs

Student activities (also known as campus activities) are student-focused extracurricular clubs and programs offered at a college or university. Student activities are generally designed to allow students to become more involved on campus. Often, such activities provide the students with opportunities to develop leadership, social responsibility, citizenship, volunteerism, and employment experience. These activities are typically overseen by a director of student activities, student affairs, or student engagement who may hold a master's degree in student development (or a comparable field). The director will guide the clubs and programs in their operations, set the minimum standards that these organizations should achieve, and help these organizations network with similar organizations at other institutions. External organizations like the National Association for Campus Activities (NACA) or the Association for the Promotion of Campus Activities (APCA) are good platforms for such cross-institutional networking to take place.

== Types of student activities ==
Student activities generally fall under one or more of the following categories:

=== Academic ===
Academic student activities refer to clubs and programs specifically focused on helping a student in the academic sense. These can be major-based, area of study-based clubs, or programs and events designed to educate students in any scholarly subject matter.

Some examples of academic student activities include:

- Accounting Society
- Language Clubs
- Art History Club
- Public Relations Student Society
- Pre-Law Society

=== Civic engagement ===
Civic engagement student activities generally refer to clubs and programs focused on creating positive societal change. Some of these activities may also fall under the academic category, as these activities work to educate students about social issues and the importance of getting involved.

Some examples of civic engagement activities include:

- Action in Africa
- Colleges Against Cancer
- Lions Club School Chapters
- Circle K International
- Political Party-Based Clubs
- College/University Day of Service

=== Diversity and culture ===
Diversity or cultural student activities generally refer to clubs and programs focused on the representation of minority groups on campus. These activities may also fall under the academic category as they seek to educate students on cultural differences.

Some examples of diversity/cultural activities include:

- Black Student Union
- Asian Pacific Student Association
- Feminist Club
- LGBT Alliance
- Disability Alliance
- Diversity Training Programs

=== Event planning board ===
A student-run event planning board is a student activity that works under a faculty advisor to plan events for students, including concerts, speakers, dances, movie screenings, etc. Generally, this board is also responsible for hosting specific traditional events. These types of groups are often funded by grants from the college or university. Ralf Georges Mansour notes, "As a student run organization, externals are what gives us support, credibility and recognition. External affairs and internal development are interdependent and symbiotic in their essence.".

=== Fraternities and sororities ===
College fraternities and sororities are exclusive social organizations. These groups are referred to as Greek because their names are made up of two or three Greek letters, and generally focus on the betterment and empowerment of members. Students go through a bidding process in order to be initiated into one of these organizations. Universities and colleges also have Panhellenic and Inter-Fraternity Councils, which act as the governing body over Greek organizations. Some honor societies can also be considered Greek organizations due to their Greek letter affiliation. These organizations, however, tend to be co-ed, while fraternities are all-male groups and sororities are all-female groups.

Some examples of Greek organizations are:

- Alpha Gamma Delta
- Delta Tau Delta
- Pi Beta Phi
- Alpha Epsilon Pi

=== Honor societies ===
Honor societies are student activities that recognize academic excellence among students. These organizations are usually exclusive to students who have excelled academically, based on scholastic ranking and/or grade point average. Honor societies are typically national or even international organizations that have established chapters at certain colleges and universities.

Some examples of honor societies include:

- National Society of Leadership & Success
- National Society of Collegiate Scholars
- Alpha Kappa Delta
- Mortar Board National College Senior Honor Society
- Phi Beta Kappa

=== Leisure ===
Leisure clubs are student activities that give students the opportunity to connect with other students with similar hobbies and are an opportunity to socialize and take a break from the academic side of student life.

Some examples of leisure activities include:

- Acapella/singing groups
- Acting clubs
- Fan clubs
- Cooking clubs

=== Recreational ===
Recreational activities are student activities that involve some form of physical activity.

Some examples of recreational activities include:

- Dance classes
- Intramural Sports teams
- Club sports
- Surfing clubs
- Sports tournaments

Some examples of athletic activities include:

- Football
- Baseball
- Soccer
- Volleyball
- Wrestling
- Basketball
- Golf
- Hockey
- Cricket

=== Religious and spiritual ===
Religious/spiritual student activities refer to clubs and programs that allow students to connect with other students of similar faiths, practice their chosen faith, and/or learn about other faiths. Many schools have a faith center where these sorts of programs take place.

Some examples of religious/spiritual activities include:

- Interfaith Council
- Fellowship of Christian Athletes
- International Justice Mission
- Latter-Day Saint Student Association
- Groups for minorities that may fit into the religion of Pagan, etc.

=== Student-run businesses ===
Student-run businesses are student activities that involve running a business that has an affiliation with the college or university and is almost completely, if not completely, run by student workers.

Some examples of student-run businesses include:

- College/University Radio Stations
- College/University Local Television Stations
- Production Company
- Advertising Firms

=== National clubs ===
National clubs refer to student activities that exist throughout the country.

- Habitat for Humanity
- Honors Across State/Country Borders
- Engineering Without Borders
- Global Brigades

== High school ==
Compared to college, high school provides a platform to experiment and build a foundation for further education. Students can join various clubs such as student government, athletics, and science olympiad to make one well rounded and diversified. Participation in these clubs can support college applications and also provides skills they can use in the future. These skills include teamwork, organizational skills, leadership, critical thinking, and social skills. Early development of these skills allows student to develop them during their time in upper education.

== Benefits ==
Participating in such clubs can impact the academic and social performance of the student involved based on their level of involvement. Skills such as academic autonomy, cultural participation, educational involvement, life management, and establishing and clarifying purpose increase in direct relation to the level of involvement.

Students who participate in club activities in their freshman year have a greater chance of continuing participation throughout their senior year. Due to this increasing time spent interacting within the club, it was also found that students who stay involved are more likely to move up the hierarchical chain of power i.e. member to the treasurer to the president. These board positions, while hard to achieve unless given the position, can lead to substantial benefits to the student in both the long and short term. In the short term, the student will be exposed to unique challenges that will force the student to voice their opinion as well as making critical decisions. By achieving such positions, the students can make positive changes in ways that they see fit or in ways to improve the quality and caliber of the club. Both the student and the club benefit from such actions, the club will build off of the new leadership while the student will mature and develop essential skills. When looking at the long term effects, the skills learned will help the student in upper-level classes as well as applying to jobs and post graduate programs, which is the next step in any student's career.

Engagement in such activities can provides student with more credentials for applying for upper-level positions and schools. In addition, there is greater personal growth both in the workplace and mind as well as giving back to the community in the form of volunteering.

== Disadvantages ==
Spending too much time in a club can potentially have negative effects on the student's studies. Clubs require commitment physically, mentally, and in the value of time. With that being so, taking time and energy away from one's studies in order to fulfill the clubs commitment can hinder academic performance.

Breaking such commitments can lead to one being kicked out or preventing one from participating in future club events. In some cases, clubs may require a travelling aspect where a student must not only devote time but also weekend and breaks due to their commitments. Noting that students do pursue certain clubs for resume purposes, some leaders of the clubs might not be as dedicated as others. Though the lack of quality does leave the door open for the student to correct and improve it, the value of time must still be considered.

While this isn't the case for all clubs, understanding the quality, atmosphere, and emotions the leaders present can give valuable insight on how the club will perform. For clubs that tend to travel within or out of the state are not typically funded by the university or college. Clubs do tend to provide ways for the student to gather money such as fundraising, drives, or club hosted activities. On one hand, it does provide the student to explore the world through a college setting, on the other hand, it does take time and money to complete such trips. Students who are considering joining clubs must ultimately decide whether the trip and accessories of the club are worth those sacrifices.

== How to get involved ==
Campuses offer a variety of ways to introduce incoming and current students to the student activities that are held on campus. Involvement fairs are a common enrollment method where groups have designated a booth, giving them a platform to generate interest in their activities. From there, students are able to walk through these booths, chatting and learning what the clubs do, what their beliefs are, their mission, cost, etc. A quick and efficient way for students to talk to a variety of clubs in a short amount of time to figure out how and what they can get involved in. These fairs are normally held once a year typically in the first half of both semesters. Websites are also used that allow the student to input keywords or phrases to search and filter clubs within the university. From there, the user can then gather contact information, read quick biographies about the club, and look at photos to get a sense of the club. Other ways of getting involved are through friends, word of mouth, other clubs, or through flyers and posters around campus.

== Additional benefits and disadvantages ==
=== Increasing Social Network ===
Students can find it difficult to make friends with random people. Participating in clubs allows students to find common ground between others which can hopefully start a friendship. These friendships are essential in college as they provide a place for social interaction, others to study with, people to eat with, and more.

=== Networking ===
Meeting people and creating connections provide opportunities in the future when searching for jobs. Even if the connection is weak, the more connections one has the higher the chance he/she has when job searching. Those connections can either direct or recommend their friends to those who are hiring in hopes to land a job.

=== Resume ===
A resume is a list of accomplishments an individual has achieved throughout their lifetime that they wish to include when applying for a job. The resume and quality of it are essential when applying as it is a direct representation of the individual it belongs to. Participation in clubs and organizations allows the student to add that information to the resume and in turn making it stronger. If the student can reach upper-level positions within the club, that too can add to the resume.

=== Lack of downtime ===
Not participating in clubs can impact the college experience as it increases the amount of downtime the student has. A deceiving problem to have as if a student feels that they have more time to complete work they might push it back decreasing their use of time and increasing their procrastination. Also, having a more structured schedule allows the student to have consistency and rhythm throughout the week which can aid in planning, time management and ease of mind.
