= Shorewood Village Hall =

- U.S. National Register of Historic Places
- Shorewood Village Hall
- Location: 3930 N. Murray Ave. Shorewood, Wisconsin
- Coordinates: 43.08824°N 87.88472°W
- Architectural style: Neoclassical
- NRHP reference No.: 84003739
- Added to NRHP: September 7, 1984

The Shorewood Village Hall is a historic municipal building in Shorewood, Wisconsin. It was added to the National Register of Historic Places in 1984.

== History ==
The building was originally constructed in 1908, as a school in what was then called East Milwaukee: School House No. 4. By 1915, the community had outgrown the building and the new Atwater Elementary School was built to replace it. In 1916, the village bought the building to use as its village hall. It was Shorewood's first and only seat of local government.

The original schoolhouse was architecturally rather nondescript - a three-story cross-gabled building clad in Milwaukee cream brick. In 1937, aiming to improve the appearance of this symbol of Shorewood and to stabilize Shorewood's economy during the Great Depression, the village and the New Deal Works Progress Administration funded cosmetic upgrades which made the building more grandly Classical Revival in style. They added the Doric order portico and pilasters around the main entrance. Rusticated stone veneer was added at the ground level. Inside, the original woodwork was replaced with knotty pine. All this was financed with about $14,500 from the WPA and $3,500 from the village.
