= Blinded (2004 film) =

2004 by Scottish director Eleanor Yule

Blinded is a 2004 film written and directed by Scottish director Eleanor Yule.

The film was produced by Oscar van Heek and John Crissey III (associate producer). Executive producers are Bill Gore, Steve McIntyre, Carole Sheridan and Agnes Wilkie. To help maintain a high level of authenticity Jill Daley worked as a blind adviser on the film.

== Cast ==
- Anders W. Berthelsen as Mike Hammershoi
- Samantha Bond as Caroline Lamar
- Phyllida Law as Bella Black
- Jodhi May as Rachel Black
- Peter Mullan as Francis Black

== Awards ==
In 2004, the film won the Jury Award at the Celtic Film and Television Festival and it also won the Silver Screen award at the U.S. International Film and Video Festival. It was nominated for the Raindance Award at the 2004 British Independent Film Awards.
