= The 502s =

American indie folk band

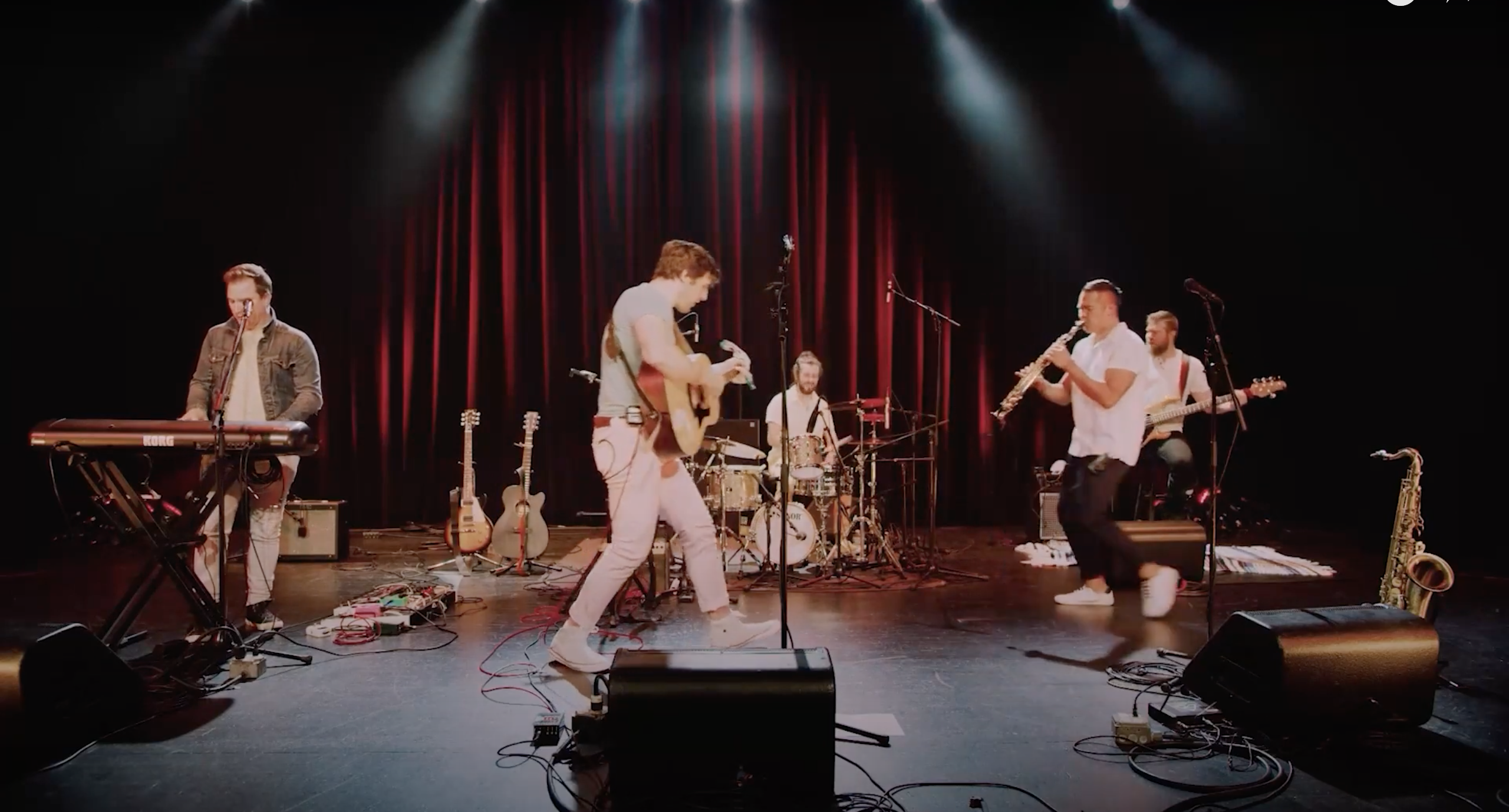
- The 502s performing live in 2021.: (left to right: Matthew Tonner, Eddie Isola, Sean Froehlich, Joe Capati, Nicholas Dallas)

Background information
- Origin: Maitland, Florida, United States
- Genres: Indie folk; folk rock; folk-pop; Americana; indie rock
- Years active: 2015–present
- Members: Eddie Isola; Sean Froehlich; Joe Capati; Nick Melashenko; Graci Phillips
- Past members: Jonathan Ruiz; Jake Isola; Kaleigh LeBeau; Matthew Tonner
- Website: www.the502s.com

The 502s are an American indie folk band from Maitland, Florida formed by Eddie Isola. Their sound has been described as a "folk orchestra", and as a blend of roots, rock, and bluegrass. The 502s refer to themselves as "the happiest band on Earth."

The band's music is often compared to Edward Sharpe and the Magnetic Zeros, The Avett Brothers, and Old Crow Medicine Show, and the band is noted for their eclectic instrumental arrangements involving banjo, piano, and horns. Their live show received praise for "rambunctious energy, stomping sounds... and charismatic personalities" by Cowboys & Indians. Initially consisting of Eddie Isola and his cousins with a rotating cast of musicians, the band's longest standing consistent lineup includes Joe Capati (saxophones), Sean Froehlich (drums and percussion), and Nicholas Melashenko (bass guitar), with their newest member, Graci Phillips (guitar), joining the band in 2023.

== History ==
=== Formation and early history (2015-2016) ===
Influenced by bands such as The Head and the Heart and Bear's Den, Ed Isola began writing songs in college with a $100 banjo and a guitar he borrowed from his roommate. After graduating and returning home, Ed recruited his cousins Jonathan Ruiz on guitar and vocals and Jacob Isola on bass. The band's name was derived from the street number of Isola's childhood home address.

Shortly after the band's inception in 2016, The 502s won a contest to perform at Okeechobee Music & Arts Festival, alongside Mumford and Sons, The Avett Brothers, and Kendrick Lamar, beating out over 800 contest entrants. Their performance at Okeechobee took place before the band had released any recorded material. The 502s released a self-titled EP in 2016. The release has been described as “a rousing debut that personifies the folk explosion from the past few years highlighted by booming stomps, upbeat tunes, and melodious gang vocals that ooze camaraderie.”

The single “Olivia” was highlighted by local NPR radio station WMFE on their “Hold on to Summer” playlist and the band performed headlining slots at Florida Music Festival and Winter Garden Music Festival. Also in 2016, The 502s were invited to perform at Communion Records' NYC showcase alongside up-and-coming artists Salt Cathedral, Overcoats, Ocean Park Standoff, Michael Daves, and Eric Slick.

=== "Because We Had To" (2017-2019) ===
In 2017 the band recruited Matthew Tonner, a childhood friend of the Isola family and a former member of Laney Jones' band, to produce their debut album Because We Had To. The album was recorded in thirty-six hours. Tonner soon joined the band on piano and electric guitar, along with trumpeter Kaleigh LeBeau.

The lead single “What To Do” was released in March 2018 and received a positive review from No Depression, stating “they've got enough energy to take on the world.” The premiere was preceded by a live video featuring six members of the band and their instruments squeezed into Ed's grandfather's 6×10 laundry room. The album has been described by WMNF as "a heartfelt invitation to good old-fashioned fun," and by PopMatters as “sounds of celebration ... an ebullient blend of boisterous Americana, featuring cheery singalong vocals and bubbly trumpet lines that could get anyone off of their feet.”

In 2018, The 502s embarked on a tour of the US and Europe and performed at festivals alongside Jason Isbell and Old Crow Medicine Show. The band also headlined WMNF's Americana Fest in Tampa, FL. In 2019, The 502s touring included performances at Americanafest in Nashville, recording a live session with Jam in the Van, and headlining Steppin' Out Festival in Blacksburg, Virginia. Prior to Americanafest, The 502s solidified a new touring lineup featuring Joe Capati on horns, Sean Froehlich on drums, and Nick Melashenko on bass guitar. The European tour culminated with a gig in Whelans bar in Dublin, during which time the band had their greatest European show.

=== "Could It Get Better Than This" (2020-2022) ===
In a local news interview, Isola and Tonner stated that the band's second album would be released in 2021 and would be called Could It Get Better Than This. During the COVID-19 pandemic, the 502s created an online experience called Camp Feels Good, to allow their fans to listen to the album and access exclusive behind the scenes content ahead of its release.

In November 2020, a video of The 502s performing a new song "Magdalene" was posted to the band's TikTok account and received over 1 Million views in two days. The "Magdalene" video also featured the return of Jake Isola to the band as acoustic guitarist.

In February 2021, Glide Magazine premiered the first single from the album, along with a music video directed by Tonner, for the song "I Keep Rolling". The album's second single “Leading Lady” premiered in March 2021 on The Bluegrass Situation.

Could It Get Better Than This was released on October 15, 2021 and promoted with a US release tour. The album received critical acclaim and over one million streams in its first week of release.

In late 2021, The 502s' song "Just A Little While" became a viral TikTok trend, resulting in over 10 Million streams from December 2021 to January 2022. Also in January 2022, The 502s charted on the Irish Singles Chart Top 50 for the first time with "Just A Little While" debuting at #29. The song ultimately charted on Billboard's Hot Rock and Alternative Charts, as well as the #3 spot on Spotify's Top Viral 50.

In the wake of their viral songs, The 502s embarked on successful tours of the United States and Europe in 2022, including their first ever set at Bonnaroo Music and Arts Festival, a headlining set at the Florida Music Conference in their hometown of Orlando, and the grand opening of Dr. Phillips Center for the Performing Arts' Steinmetz Hall. In 2023, The 502s were added to the lineup of the Okeechobee Music & Arts Festival, returning to festival whose 2016 edition featured the band's first ever live gig.

=== "Just Another EP", "Stories to Tell" and "Pure Serotonin" (2022-2023) ===
The band released their single, "Hey Julia" in June 2022 as the lead-off to Just Another EP. In 2023, The 502s embarked on the "Fresh Squeezed Happiness" tour across the United States, coinciding with the release of new songs "Backstage in Glasgow", "Inside Joke" and more from a second EP titled Stories to Tell.

That summer, The 502s released their third EP in a year, titled Pure Serotonin, coinciding with their performance at Lollapalooza. The 502s also announced a forthcoming new full album and tour in 2024.

Graci Phillips joined the band as acoustic guitarist after The 502s' performance at Theatre of Living Arts in Philadelphia. The 502s closed out 2023 with performances at BottleRock Napa Valley, Moon River Festival, Borderlands Festival, and a headlining tour of UK and the EU.

=== Self-Titled Album & Great American Road Trip Tour (2024) ===
On April 12, 2024 the band released their self-titled, third full-length album, and embarked on a North American tour across 26 cities, produced by Live Nation. During the tour, the band performed a unique improvised setlist each night, pulling from their catalog of over 50 songs.

Coinciding with the announcement of the Great American Road Trip Tour, Westword hailed The 502s as "one of the best live bands of their generation."

The 502s ended 2024 with a headlining tour of Europe and their first tour of Australia, as well as releasing their first live album, The 502s Live, 2024.

== Members ==
=== Current members ===
- Ed Isola – lead vocals, banjo (2016–present)
- Sean Froehlich – drums (2018–present)
- Joe Capati – horns, backing vocals (2018–present)
- Nicholas Dallas – bass, backing vocals (2018–present)
- Graci Phillips – guitar, backing vocals (2023–present)

=== Former members ===
- Jonathan Ruiz – guitar, backing vocals (2016–2019)
- Jake Isola – bass (2016–2018), guitar (2021–2023)
- Kaleigh LeBeau – horns (2016–2018)
- Tristan Smith – drums (2017–2018)
- Luke Wagner – guitar (2019–2020)
- Matthew Tonner – keyboards, backing vocals (2016–2025), guitar (2020–2025)

== Discography ==
=== Studio albums ===
- Because We Had To (2018)
- Could It Get Better Than This (2021)
- The 502s (2024)
- Easy Street (2025)

=== EPs ===
- The 502s EP (2016)
- Just Another EP (2022)
- Stories To Tell (2023)
- Pure Serotonin (2023)

=== Live album ===
- The 502s Live, 2024 (2024)
