= Eleanor Yule =

Scottish film director

Eleanor Yule is a Scottish film director, best known for her feature film Blinded and her television documentaries with Michael Palin. She also directed Ghost Stories for Christmas a TV mini-series with Christopher Lee for BBC2.

== Biography ==
From a family of stage actors, Yule studied film at the University of Glasgow and later at the University of Bristol. Her first film credit was as a director for A Small Deposit, produced by Paul Homes. The film was nominated for a BAFTA award in 1994 in the Short Film Category. In 1996, she directed Weathering the Storm for BBC 2, a documentary produced by May Miller about the lives of painters Joan Eardley and June Redfern and in 1998, she directed A Love Exposed for BBC1, which highlighted the career and relationship of Pierre Bonnard and his painter, muse, wife Marthe de Méligny. In 2000 she directed four episodes — The Stalls Of Barchester, The Ash Tree, Number 13, and A Warning To The Curious — of the BBC Scotland produced series Christopher Lee's Ghost Stories for Christmas.

Yule has worked with Michael Palin, former member of the comedy troupe Monty Python, directing a series of films, Palin on Art about people in the art world whose stories have been untold. Among their topics have been Michael Palin and the Ladies Who Loved Matisse (2003), which highlighted the story of French painter Henri Matisse and the Cone sisters, who collected his works; Michael Palin and the Mystery of Hammershoi (2005), about Danish painter Vilhelm Hammershøi; Moominland Tales: The Life of Tove Jansson (2012), chronicling the life of Finnish storyteller and painter Tove Jansson; Michael Palin in Wyeth's World, which focuses on the life of American painter Andrew Wyeth; and Quest for Artemisia (2015) about Italian painter, Artemisia Gentileschi.

Yule's first feature film was produced in 2004 and was inspired by her work with Palin on Hammershøi. When they had completed that film, he went to the Himalayas to work on another project and she wrote the screenplay for Blinded. Set in Denmark, and with one of the main characters named for the painter she tried to capture his painting imagery in the love story, which starred Peter Mullan and Jodhi May. In addition to her work in film and television, Yule gives lectures and co-wrote The Glass Half Full: Moving Beyond Scottish Miserablism (2014) with David Manderson of the University of the West of Scotland, where she was completing her PhD under his supervision. She completed her PhD in 2017 and became a lecturer at Falmouth University, when she is not working on films.
