= Hubbard Park Historic District =

Historic district in Massachusetts, United States

- U.S. National Register of Historic Places
- U.S. Historic district
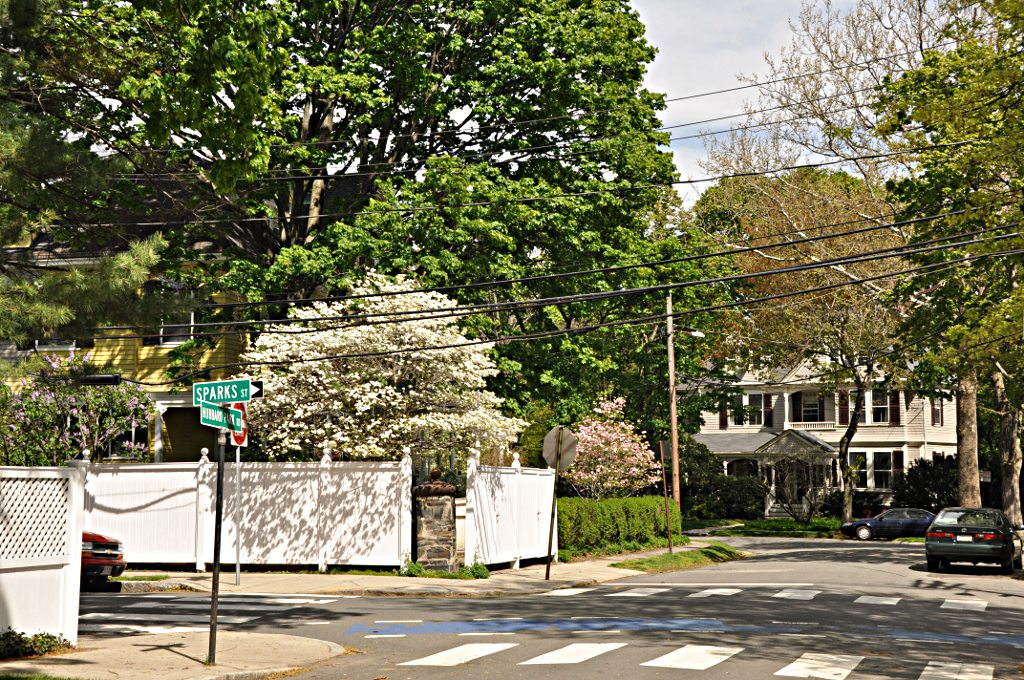

- Location within Massachusetts Location within the United States
- Location: Hubbard Park, Mercer Circle and Sparks Sts., Cambridge, Massachusetts
- Coordinates: 42°22′36″N 71°7′54″W
- Area: 6.8 acres (2.8 ha)
- Built: 1885
- Architect: Multiple
- Architectural style: Colonial Revival, Tudor Revival, Queen Anne
- MPS: Cambridge MRA
- NRHP reference No.: 82001950
- Added to NRHP: April 13, 1982

The Hubbard Park Historic District encompasses a residential development and park west of Harvard Square in Cambridge, Massachusetts. The area was originally the estate of Gardiner Hubbard, who had a 6-acre (2.4 ha) estate and house on nearby Brattle Street. In the 1880s Hubbard commissioned architects to build a ring of high quality homes around his mansion, which was demolished in 1939 and is now the site of Hubbard Park. The houses in this development are now located on Mercer Circle, Sparks Street, and Hubbard Park Road.

The district was listed on the National Register of Historic Places (NRHP) in 1982.

== See also ==
- Hubbard Park in Meriden, Connecticut, also listed on the NRHP
- National Register of Historic Places listings in Cambridge, Massachusetts
