= Forrest Crissey =

American writer

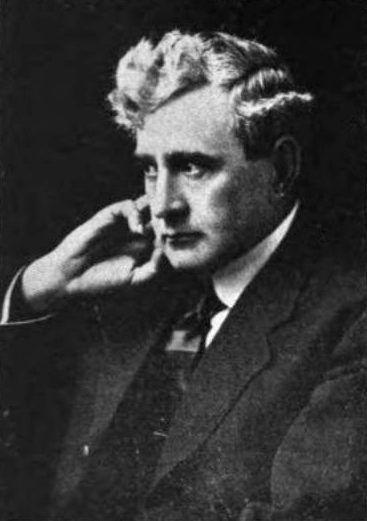
- Born: June 1, 1864; Stockton, New York
- Died: November 5, 1943 (aged 79); Geneva, Illinois
- Occupations: Writer and novelist
- Spouse: Kate Darling Shurtleff (m. 1887)

Forrest Crissey (June 1, 1864 – November 5, 1943), was a prolific early twentieth-century American writer of books and articles. His most famous work was Tattlings of a Retired Politician, a 1904 book which entails the humorous but fictional letters of William Bradley.

Other notable works included The story of foods, 1917; Where Opportunity Knocks Twice, 1914; The Romance of Moving Money (Brink's, Inc.), 1934; Alexander Legge 1866-1933, 1936; stories and articles in The Saturday Evening Post. From 1901 to 1934 he was on their staff while also writing other books, articles, and biographical information of various types.

== Personal life ==
Forrest Crissey was born in Stockton, New York, on June 1, 1864. He married Kate Darling Shurtleff on July 14, 1887, and they remained married until his death. They had one child together. He is a forebear of the businessman and film producer JC Crissey.

Forrest Crissey died in Geneva, Illinois on November 5, 1943.
