= National Association for Campus Activities =

Campus student activities programmers

- Formation: 1960
- Headquarters: Columbia, SC
- Website: www.naca.org

The National Association for Campus Activities (NACA) is an organization that provides resources for student activities programmers throughout the United States and Canada. Formed in 1960, NACA links higher education and entertainment in a business and learning partnership for students and professional staff.

== Mission ==
NACA is a nonprofit organization that provides resources for campus life. It is a member-only organization that provides programs and events focused on student and professional leadership development, program planning, and concert management. NACA connects higher education institutions (called school members) and the entertainment industry (called associate members), hosting events with musical artists, comedians, stage shows, and lecturers at regional events and an annual national event. NACA's national convention is one of the largest campus activities networking resources in the country.

== History ==
The National Association for Campus Activities began in 1960 as a cooperative booking project in North Carolina. In 1964, after a booking meeting is held at North Carolina State University with 28 colleges and universities and 11 agencies in attendance, it is determined that there was a need to add showcases and educational sessions at future events. A two-day conference in 1965 is held at North Carolina State University. Simon & Garfunkel perform, but students do not receive them with enthusiasm. In 1967, after the Block Book Conference is held in Columbia, South Carolina, the decision is made to form a national organization to share information and cooperatively buy talent. The National Entertainment Conference (NEC) is formed and the first volunteer executive director is appointed. The organization is renamed National Entertainment and Campus Activities Association (NECAA) in 1976 and 11 regions are established. In 1982, NECAA becomes the National Association for Campus Activities. The Educational Foundation is also established to provide scholarships and grants to students and student affairs professionals. The regions are reduced to seven in 2002, and in 2017, the NACA board of trustees is formed.

NACA published its first issue of a scholarly peer reviewed academic journal in 2019 called "The Journal of Campus Activities Practice & Scholarship" (JCAPS). It runs a national convention experience called NACA Live, the first of which was held in Denver in February 2020.

== Events ==
Each year there are several regional conferences and one national convention, as well as various workshops and webinars.

NACA Live is hosted each February. The four-day event provides networking opportunities for campus activities professionals, students, and the entertainment industry. About 2,000 people attend the convention each year, with hundreds of colleges and universities attending from around the United States. NACA Live is the nation's largest campus activities marketplace, hosting more than 100 live performances ranging from music and comedy to lecture and interactive programs.

There are educational sessions for students and professional school staff. These sessions focus on professional and student leadership development, programming, multicultural education, campus organization, and trends in the field. The trade show segment of the convention puts campus programmers in direct contact with agents and artists. This allows for artist meet-and-greets, product demonstrations, and experiential activities aimed at college students.

== Regions ==
NACA has seven regions:

NACA West includes Alaska, Hawaii, Washington, Oregon, California, Nevada, Idaho, Arizona, Utah, Colorado, New Mexico, west of the 107th longitude (which roughly parallels the Rocky Mountains) and the Canadian province of British Columbia.

NACA Northern Plains includes Montana, Wyoming, Wisconsin, the Upper Peninsula of Michigan, Nebraska, Iowa, Minnesota, North Dakota, South Dakota, and the Canadian provinces of Alberta, Saskatchewan, Manitoba, and Southwestern Ontario.

NACA Mid America includes Michigan, Indiana, Ohio, West Virginia, Kentucky, and Illinois.

NACA South includes Virginia (south of the Washington metropolitan area), North Carolina, South Carolina, Georgia, Florida, Alabama, Tennessee, Mississippi, and the United States & British Virgin Islands.

NACA Mid Atlantic includes New York, Pennsylvania, New Jersey, Delaware, Maryland, Washington D.C. (and the Washington metropolitan area) and the Canadian province of Eastern Ontario.

NACA Northeast includes Maine, New Hampshire, Vermont, Massachusetts, Rhode Island, Connecticut, and the Canadian provinces of New Brunswick and Quebec.

NACA Central includes Colorado and New Mexico east of the 107th longitude, Kansas, Oklahoma, Missouri, Texas, Arkansas, and Louisiana.
