= Hubbard Park (Shorewood, Wisconsin) =

- Interactive map of Hubbard Park
- Location: Shorewood, Wisconsin
- Coordinates: 43°05′00″N 87°53′30″W
- Area: 5 acres (2.0 ha)
- Created: 1922
- Operator: Shorewood Department of Public Works Forestry & Parks Department
- Website: www.villageofshorewood.org

Hubbard Park is a park in the village of Shorewood, Wisconsin that received landmark status in 2000. It is located on a nearly five-acre, 1,400 feet long strip of land between the Milwaukee River and the former Chicago and North Western Railway, now converted into part of the Oak Leaf Trail. It was named for William J. Hubbard, a former Village Board president. The park also contains Hubbard Park Lodge, a restaurant, and visitors access the park through a pedestrian tunnel running under the Oak Leaf Trail from a parking lot at the intersection of North Morris Blvd and East Menlo Blvd. Although it is located within Milwaukee County, it is not a part of the Milwaukee County Parks System.

== History ==
This riverside site has been home to a resort and a series of amusement parks. Prior to the park's 1922 purchase by Shorewood Village President William J. Hubbard, the land had been used as an Indian hunting grounds, a resort (Ludemnann's-on-the-River), a mineral spring park, an amusement park, a terminal yard, cow barns, fishing shanties, and a distribution route for ice cut from the river. In 1936, the WPA-funded Community Lodge (now called the Shorewood River Club) was built to hold community events, a function it still performs today. North of this is Hubbard Park Lodge, originally the Scoutcraft Cabin, designed for use by Boy Scouts and Girl Scouts. These state-funded workers also graded and terraced the land, created pathways and a spring-fed pool and fountain. In 1962, the Shorewood Women's club remodeled and updated the building.

== Gallery ==
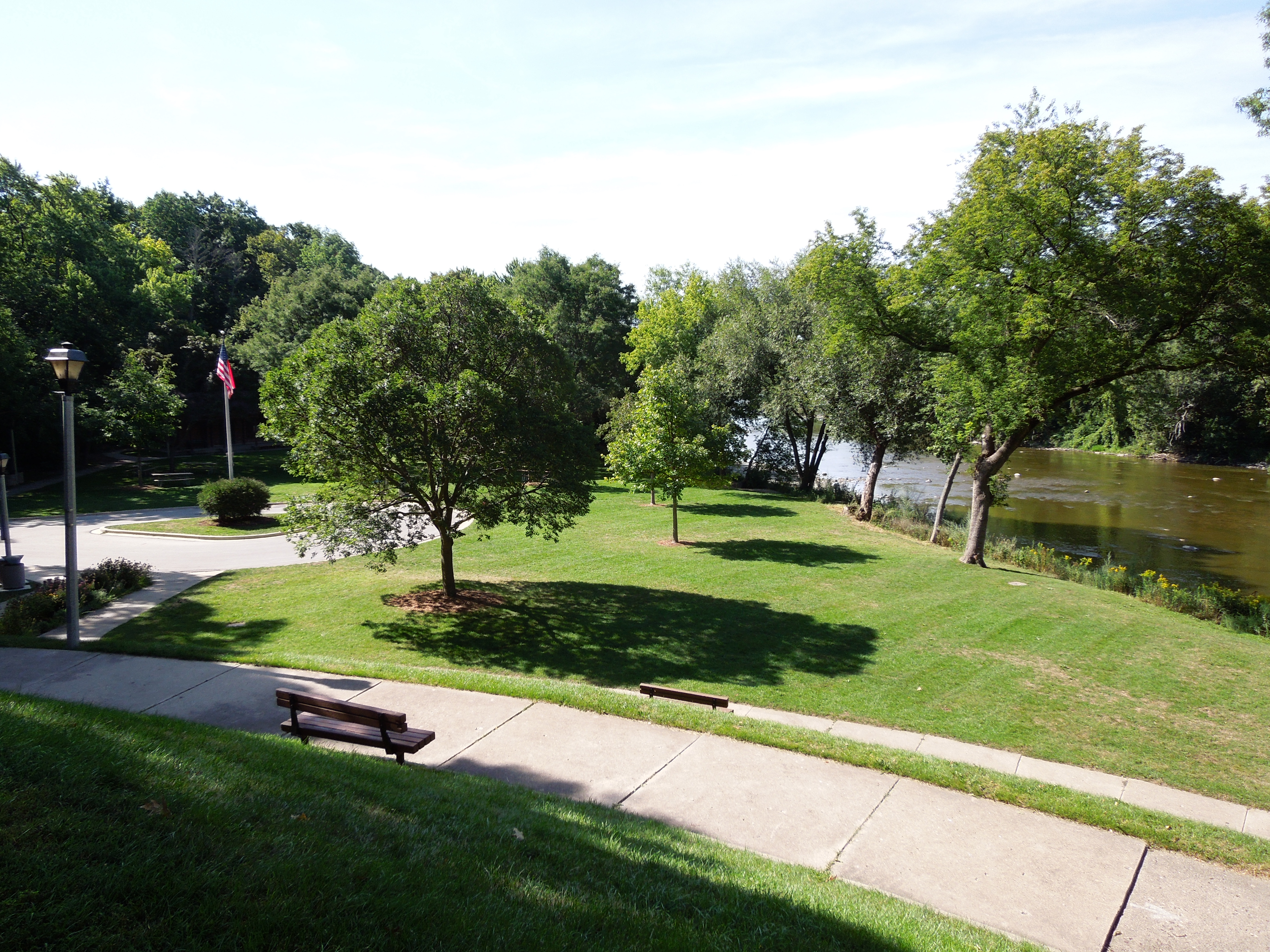
Hubbard Park view (looking south)

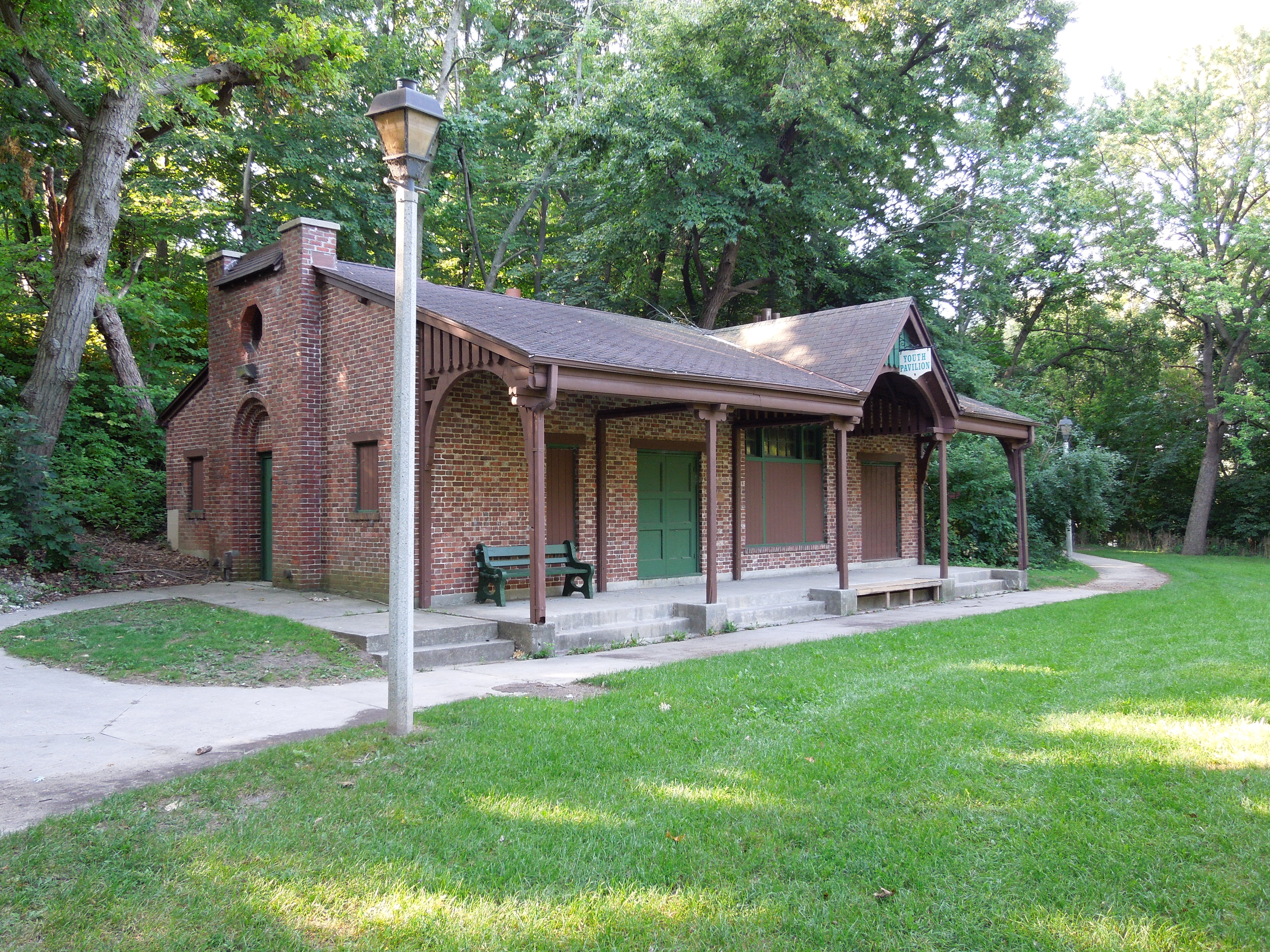
Youth Pavilion

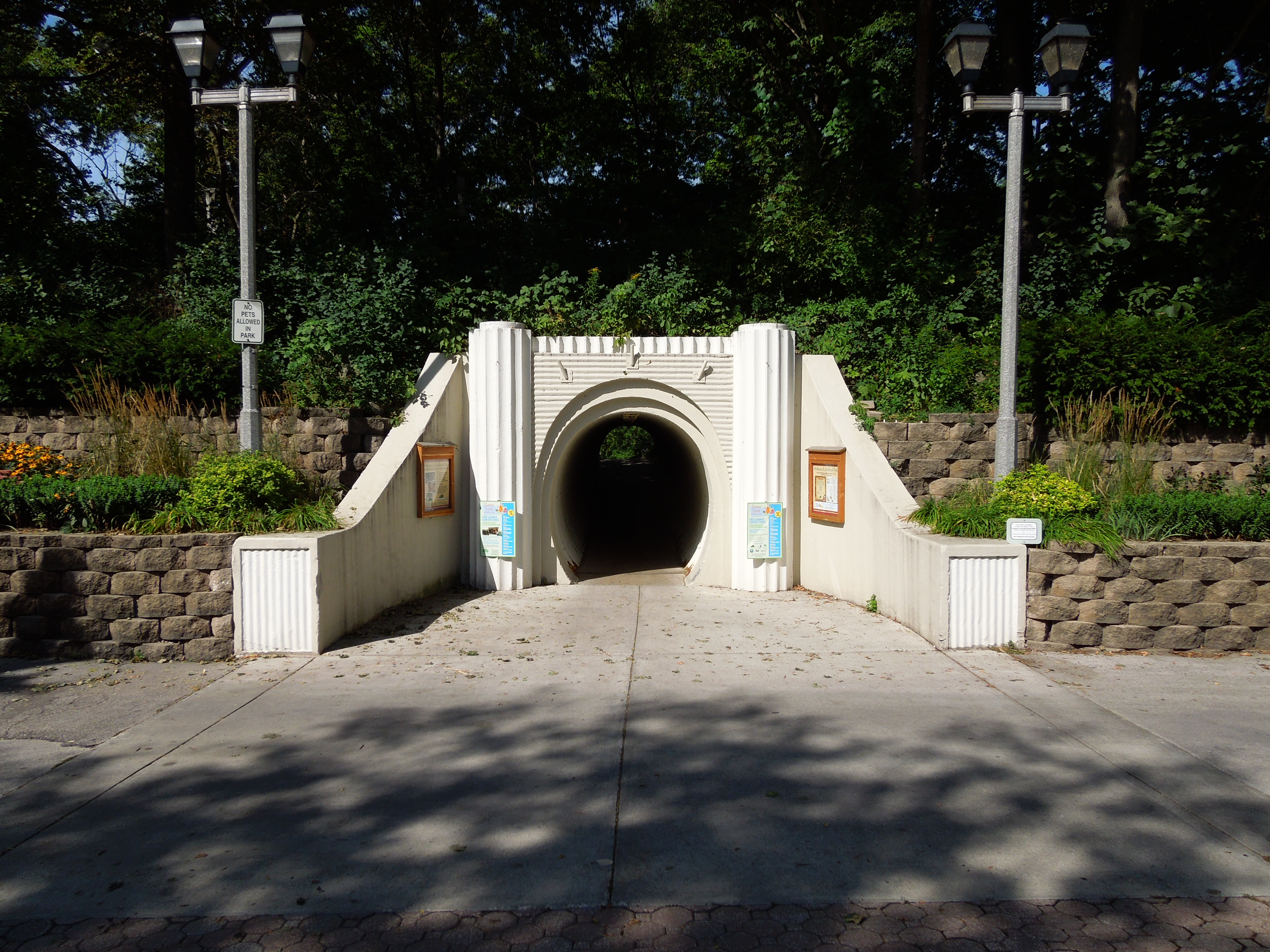
Pedestrian access tunnel (looking east)

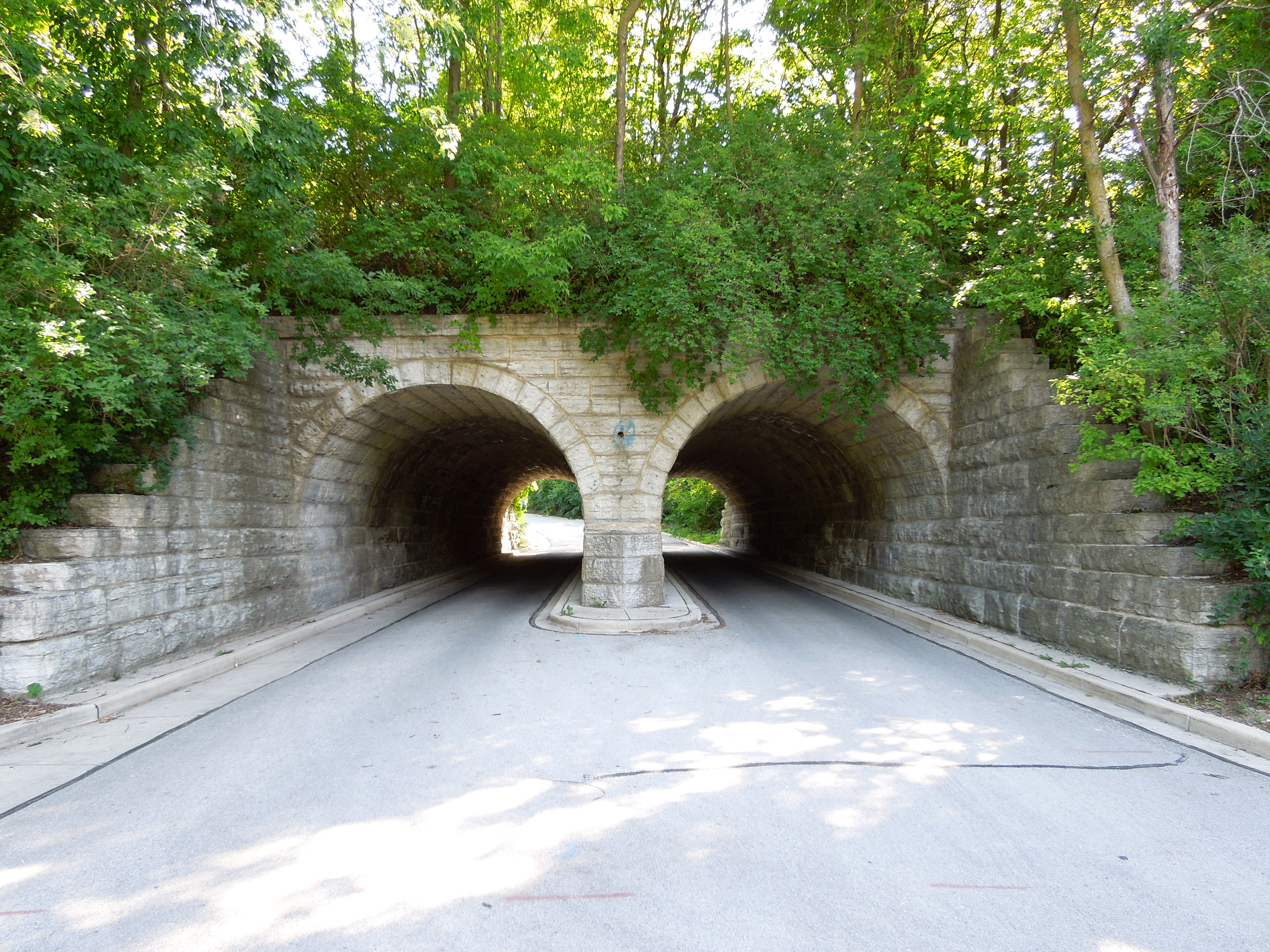
Vehicle access tunnels (looking west)
