= John Crissey III =

British-American film producer

John C. Crissey III
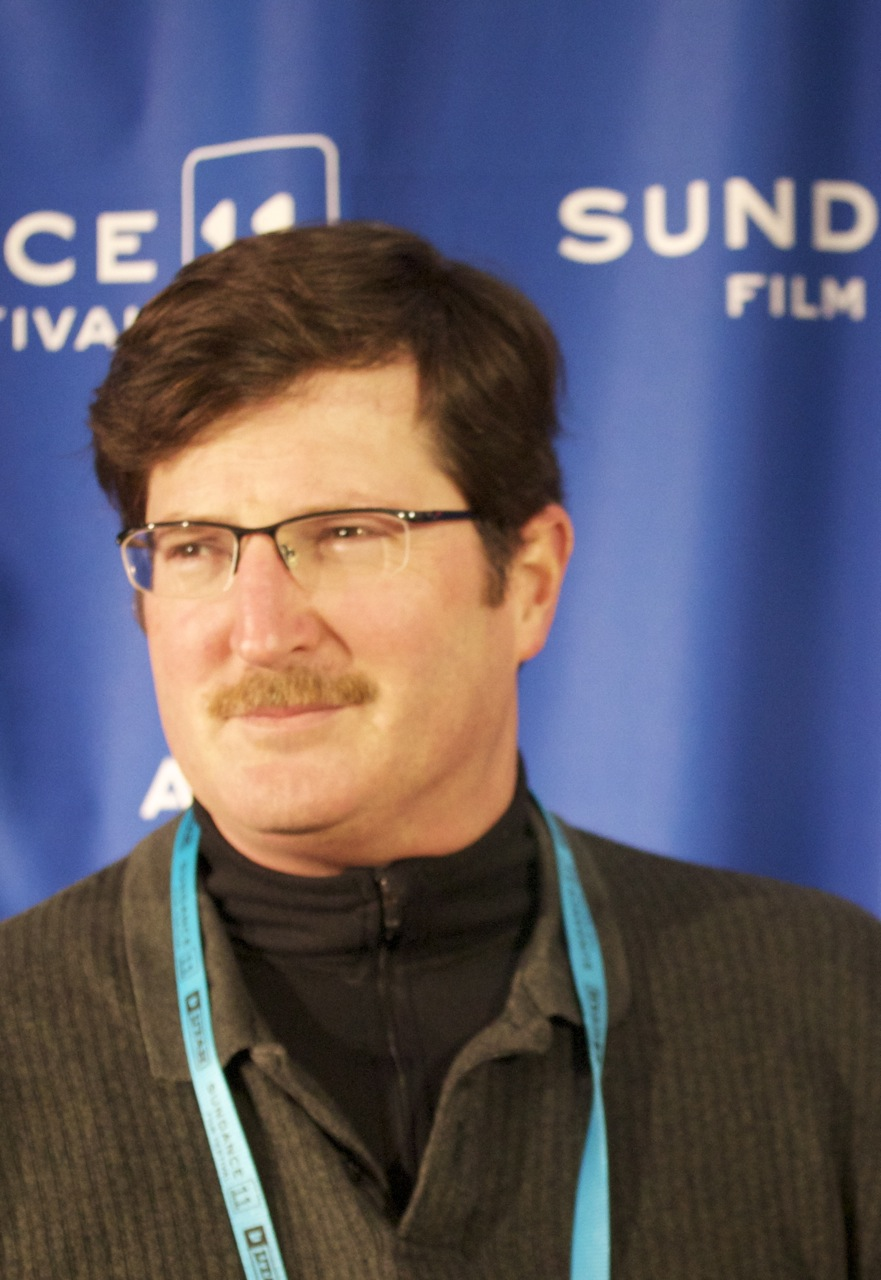
- JC Crissey in 2011
- Born: January 30, 1965 (age 61); Orlando, Florida, US
- Citizenship: United Kingdom; United States; Ireland
- Education: Newbold College, Andrews University (BBA); Rollins College (MBA); Royal Holloway, University of London (PhD)
- Occupations: Film producer (semiretired), lecturer and civic volunteer
- Years active: 1997–present
- Spouse: Jacqueline (m. 1987)
- Children: 2
- Relatives: Forrest Crissey (forebear)

John Chappell Crissey III, also known as JC Crissey, is a British-American businessman and movie producer best known for helping bring to screen the international award-winning film Blinded (2004).

== Early life, education and career ==
JC Crissey was born 30 January 1965 in Orlando, Florida to American and Spanish parents and raised in Winter Park, Florida, United States.

He graduated from Forest Lake Academy high school, obtained a BBA from Newbold College, Andrews University in 1987, an MBA from Rollins College in 1990, a DipM in 1992 and a FCIM Fellowship in 1998 from The Chartered Institute of Marketing and in 2020 a PhD in Media Arts Economics from Royal Holloway, University of London.

Before working in the motion-picture industry he worked for IBM as their EMEA Vice President for Global Business Intelligence Solutions and was a Business Lecturer for Newbold College.

== Film career ==
JC Crissey's filmmaking career is lengthy and eclectic in terms of genre, but is confined to low-budget British films. His credited associations include Blinded, Burning Light, That Samba Thing and Doorways.

He was admitted into the British Academy of Film and Television Arts as a Life Member in 2003 for his services to UK independent movie production.

From 1999 to 2026 he was the CEO of London Pictures Limited.

== Media academic ==
JC Crissey was also an adjunct lecturer at the Screen Academy Scotland from 2008 to 2014 and at the Media Arts Department, Royal Holloway University of London from 2010 to 2014. His PhD thesis is titled The UK low-budget film sector during the ‘digital revolution’ between 2000 and 2012: a quantitative assessment of its technological, economic and cultural characteristics.

== Partial filmography ==
- Blinded (2004), associate producer
- Burning Light (2006), executive/co-producer
- That Samba Thing (2007), co-producer
- K (2008), producer
- Doorways (2014), producer

== Civic career, politics and volunteering ==
JC Crissey has served as a town councillor for Petersfield Town Council from 2019 to 2025 and as town mayor of Petersfield from 2023 to 2024. In addition to these political roles, he has contributed to the British justice system as a magistrate in the County of Hampshire since 2024.

Since 1983 he has been a member of the UK Conservative and Unionist Party and was a Vote Leave campaigner in the 2016 Brexit Referendum.

== Personal life ==
JC Crissey is married to wife Jacqueline Crissey since 1987 and he has two children.
