= Laney Jones =

American singer-songwriter (born 1991)

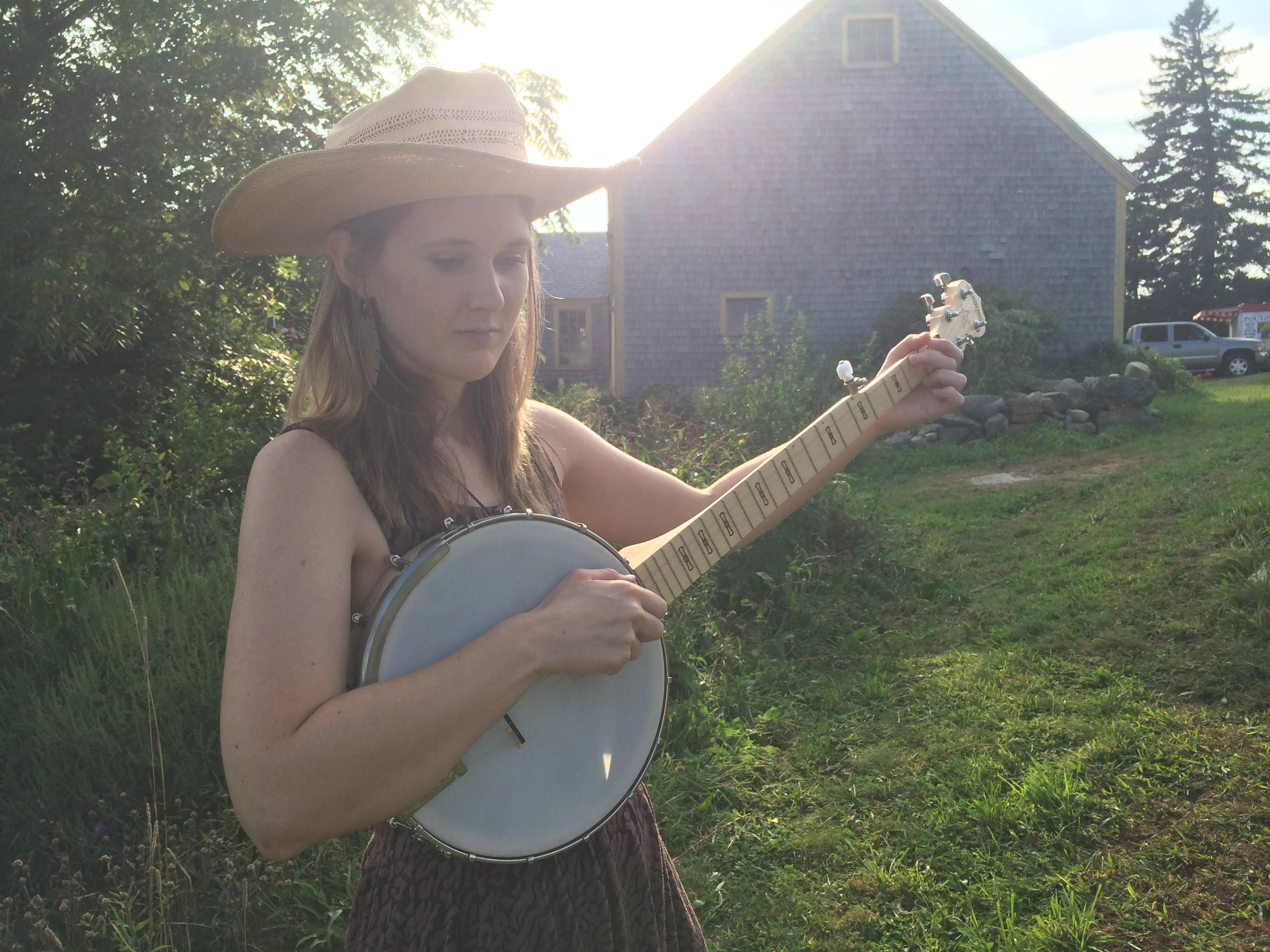
- Laney Jones in 2014

Background information
- Born: October 14, 1991 (age 35); Stevensville, Maryland, USA
- Origin: Mount Dora, Florida, USA
- Genre: Folk rock
- Occupations: Singer, songwriter, multi-instrumentalist
- Instruments: Vocals, banjo, ukulele, guitar, harmonica, saw
- Years active: 2011–present
- Website: www.laney-jones.com

Laney Jones is an American musician, songwriter and frontwoman of the touring band Laney Jones and the Spirits. Jones is a vocalist and multi-instrumentalist and performs on banjo, ukulele, guitar, and harmonica. Her voice was described by the Orlando Weekly as "a thing that brims with as much sweet innocence as it does rich craft."

== Early life ==
Laney Jones was born in Maryland and moved with her family to Florida at age 6, where her parents raised kangaroos, wallabies, fennec foxes and other exotic animals on a 10-acre farm. From a young age, Jones began taking singing lessons and performing in musical theater.

== Music career ==
=== 2011-13: early years and Golden Road ===
Jones first began writing and performing her own music while studying for an international business degree at Rollins College. Jones later attended Berklee College of Music and majored in songwriting. Among her songwriting teachers at Berklee was former American Idol judge Kara DioGuardi whose influence Jones has cited as pivotal in her career.

Jones self-produced and released her first studio album, Golden Road on July 12, 2013. Later that year, she was invited to perform her original song “Broken Hearts” for a masterclass at the John F. Kennedy Center for the Performing Arts. This performance was featured on the American Voices episode of PBS's Great Performances alongside Alison Krauss, Sara Bareilles, Ben Folds, Josh Groban, and Renee Fleming.

=== 2014–present: Laney Jones ===
In 2014 Laney Jones was recognized by the John Lennon Songwriting Contest for a co-written electronic song "Still Want You To Be Mine". The same year, Jones was selected as a winner in the Southern Musician Showcase by Charlotte-based department store Belk Inc. She and her band were official showcase artists at the 2015 Americana Music Festival and Conference. Leading up to the release of her self-titled album, Jones was named one of "10 Country Artists You Need To Know" by Rolling Stone

On March 11, 2016 she released her album Laney Jones, her first effort working with Grammy-nominated producer David Plakon. The album has received critical acclaim. In a positive review of the album, Paste Magazine stated "in a market saturated with unexceptional indie folk singer-songwriters, Jones stands out as a musician who can both pen a pop song and subvert expectations." Elmore Magazine awarded Laney Jones a rating of 95 out of 100, praising Jones songwriting as "packed with power, teeming with lush melodies, sincere songwriting, and rounded, riveting rhythm... Tackling relevant subjects like youth and growing up by mixing Millennial viewpoints with a retro sound, Jones manages to craft an album designed for the past, present, and future."

== Musical style ==
In a 2015 interview with L.A. Record, Laney Jones cited Bob Dylan and Gillian Welch as major influences on her early recordings. She said that modern folk rock bands such as Wilco, Dr Dog, and Lake Street Dive were important influences on her more recent work. Jones has cited Dan Auerbach, Jeff Tweedy and Arcade Fire as her "musical heroes".
In a review of her 2016 self-titled album, Paste Magazine compared Jones to Fleet Foxes and Bon Iver, referring to her as "an indie folk presence with a penchant for experimentation." For her part, Jones has resisted genre categorization, dubbing her musical style "retro majestic"

== Discography ==
Title	Album details
Beyond the Blue	Release: January 1, 2012; Label: Self-released; Format: digital download CD
Golden Road	Release: July 12, 2013; Label: Self-released; Format: digital download CD
Laney Jones	Release: March 11, 2016; Label: Tone Tree; Format: Vinyl 12", digital download, CD
Stories up High	Release: February 15, 2022; Label: AHPO Records; Format: Vinyl 12", digital download, CD
