= Indiana Harbor East Breakwater Light =

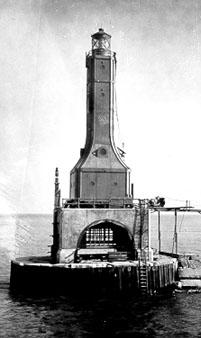
- Location: East side of Indiana Harbor and Ship Canal entrance to Lake Michigan
- Coordinates: 41°40′51″N 87°26′28″W

Tower
- Construction: steel
- Height: 23 m (75 ft)
- Shape: square tower

Light
- First lit: 1935
- Focal height: 78 feet (24 m)
- Lens: fourth-order Fresnel lens
- Range: 12 nautical miles; 23 kilometres (14 mi)
- Characteristic: Isophase green 6s

The Indiana Harbor East Breakwater Light is an active aid to navigation that marks the end of a breakwater on the east side of the Indiana Harbor and Ship Canal where it enters Lake Michigan.

== History ==
According to the Northwest Ordinance of 1787, Michigan's southern boundary should be a line drawn from the southern tip of Lake Michigan east to Lake Erie. Due to errors of cartography, Lake Michigan was charted further north than it really is. This error put Toledo, Ohio and the Maumee River mouth in Ohio. This was one of the bones of contention involved in the “Toledo War”, which was only resolved by Act of Congress, and the related award of the Upper Peninsula to Michigan. All of this had an indirect effect on Indiana's northern border, which now encompassed the southern tip of Lake Michigan.

Indiana Harbor was constructed over several years, beginning in 1901, and this included a breakwater paralleling the east edge of the channel where it enters the lake. In 1914 responsibility for the waterway and its facilities was assumed by the Corps of Engineers, and there is some indication that the Corps erected a lighthouse on the breakwater in 1920; however, information on its construction is lacking.

On 26 March 1901, Inland Steel Company contracted with Lake Michigan Land Company. It accepted fifty acres of dune land near East Chicago and a promise that a harbor and railroad would be built, in consideration of a promise to build a steel plant there that would cost no less than one million dollars. For $500,000, Inland Steel divested itself of Inland Iron and Forge Company, and raised another $500,000 to fund the project.

During 1901 and 1902, Indiana Harbor was dredged and a breakwater built. In 1903, work began on a canal that would eventually linking the Indiana Harbor inland to both the Grand Calumet River and Lake George. Over the next several years, many industries were established there.

In 1914, the federal government assumed responsibility for Indiana Harbor and the canal. The first lighthouse was constructed in the harbor in 1920. The current light was erected in 1935, and is identical to the better known Port Washington Breakwater Light in Wisconsin. It is an Art Deco steel tower standing on a circular pier at the tip of the breakwater. The original lantern, which housed a fourth order Fresnel lens (1 second flash every 7.5 seconds), has been removed and replaced by a modern beacon with a characteristic of three seconds on followed by three seconds off.

It is one of a dozen past or present lighthouses in Indiana.

The prior square light was decommissioned when it became redundant, as the harbor had grown past it.

A contemporary unmanned light in the Art Deco style is the Gravelly Shoal Light in Michigan.

Although it never had a resident lighthouse keeper, this light is a recognized 'significant light" by the National Park Service National Maritime Initiative.

In June, 2009 the Coast Guard proposed changing the light to a green Light emitting diode.

== Getting there ==
The industrial area surrounding the breakwater is private and the area closed. It is best seen from the water. Charters, however, are available.

The lighthouse is owned by the Coast Guard and the tower is closed.

== See also ==
- Lighthouses in the United States
- National Historic Lighthouse Preservation Act
