= Indiana Harbor and Ship Canal =

Artificial waterway on Lake Michigan, USA

Indiana Harbor Canal
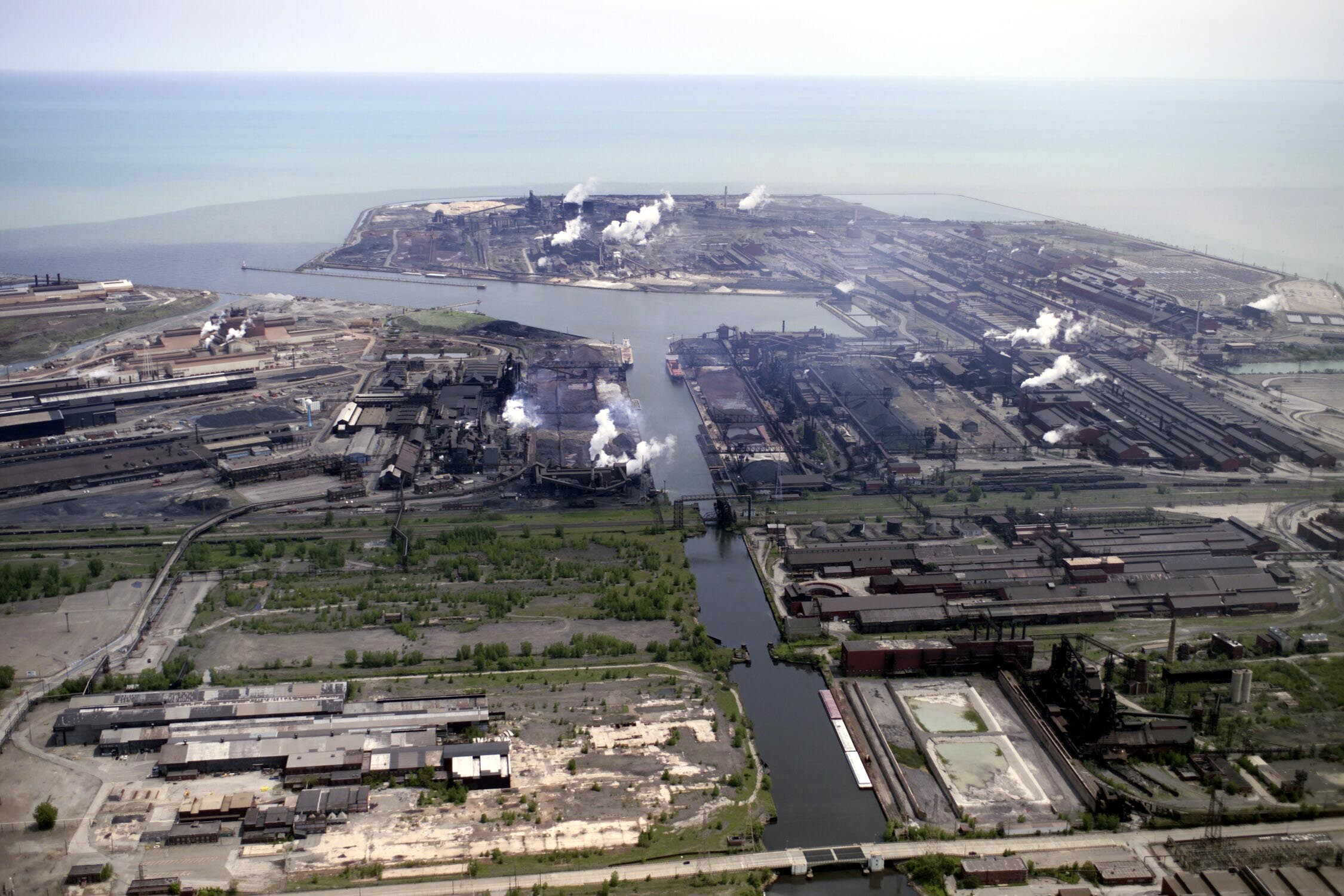
- Aerial view of Indiana Harbor and Ship Canal
- Interactive map of Indiana Harbor Canal
- Location: East Chicago, Indiana
- Country: United States
- Coordinates: 41.6684°N 87.4402°W

Specifications
- Length: 6.75 miles (10.86 km)
- Locks: None
- Status: Open

Geography
- Start point: Lake Michigan
- End point: Grand Calumet River
- Branches: Grand Calumet River Branch; Lake George Branch

The Indiana Harbor and Ship Canal is an artificial waterway on the southwest shore of Lake Michigan, in East Chicago, Indiana, which connects the Grand Calumet River to Lake Michigan. It consists of two branch canals, the 1.25-mile (2 km) Lake George Branch and the 2-mile (3.2 km) long Grand Calumet River Branch which join to form the main Indiana Harbor Canal.

The canal also functions as a harbor (Indiana Harbor). The outer harbor is sheltered by two bulkheads marked by lights including the Indiana Harbor East Breakwater Light. Ships enter the outer harbor from the north. The inner harbor consists of the canal itself. The entrance to the outer harbor lies near Indiana Shoals, which extend up to 5 miles (8 km) offshore, where water depths are as shallow as 15 feet (4.6 m).

In 2002, Indiana Harbor was the 45th busiest harbor in the United States, handling almost 13,300,000 short tons (12,000,000 metric tons) of cargo. Foreign trade accounted for only 500,000 short tons (450,000 metric tons) of that. Indiana Harbor is maintained by the Chicago District of the U.S. Army Corps of Engineers, as authorized by the Rivers and Harbors Act of 1913.

== History ==
The canal and harbor were built over several years beginning in 1901. On March 26, 1901, Inland Steel Company accepted an offer from the Lake Michigan Land Company of 50 acres (20 hectares) of free land along with a promise of construction of a harbor and railroad. For its part, Inland Steel agreed to construct a steel mill there that would cost no less than one million dollars. The shortline railway connecting this area to other rail lines is still known as the Indiana Harbor Belt Railroad.

Marktown, Clayton Mark's planned worker community, is located at Indiana Harbor.

== Economy ==
=== Manufacturing ===
Indiana Harbor and Canal lies in a heavily industrial area which includes Cleveland-Cliffs' two Indiana Harbor Works facilities. On the west side of the canal is the former Youngstown – J & L – LTV Steel – ISG steel mill. On the east side of the canal is the other Indiana Harbor Works, once known as Inland Steel Company, then Ispat Inland. BP's refinery in Whiting is nearby.

The harbor allows transport of iron ore (taconite pellets) and limestone to the steel mills from the mines and quarries of the upper Midwest through the Great Lakes. Other commodities include coke, gypsum, steel, cement and concrete, petroleum products, and miscellaneous bulk products.

The harbor is ranked first in tonnage among the 25 federal commercial harbors on Lake Michigan, and second in tonnage of the 55 Federal commercial harbors on the Great Lakes.

== Environmental issues ==
Ninety percent of the water which passes through the Canal originates as industrial outflow or stormwater overflow. Historic contamination by polychlorinated biphenyls (PCBs), polycyclic aromatic hydrocarbons (PAHs) and heavy metals has put the canal under the EPA's Grand Calumet River Area of Concern (AoC)—the only AoC to be listed impaired in all 14 beneficial use categories. Because of this sediment contamination, no dredging has taken place in the harbor since 1972, when the USEPA determined the previous sediment disposal method of open water disposal in Lake Michigan to be unacceptable. Lacking any alternative disposal location, the harbor and canal have accumulated a backlog of approximately 1,000,000 cubic yards (760,000 m^{3}) of sediment, which hinders deep draft commercial navigation. Shipping capacity has been reduced by 15%, increasing shipping costs. The contaminated sediment also leads to further pollution of Lake Michigan, as sediments containing 67,000 pounds (30,000 kg) of chromium, 100,000 pounds (45,000 kg) of lead, and 420 pounds (190 kg) of PCBs reach the lake each year through the waterway.

The Chicago District of the U.S. Army Corps of Engineers, in partnership with the East Chicago Waterway Management District, initiated plans for a dredging and disposal project for sediment at the harbor in the 1990s. The nearby site of a former Energy Cooperative, Inc. (ECI) refinery, which is also an open USEPA Resource Conservation and Recovery Act (RCRA) site, was selected as the location for a confined disposal facility (CDF) to safely contain the contaminated sediment. Despite some local environmental justice concerns over the close proximity of the CDF to two low-income public schools, construction of the facility began in spring 2002. Dredging activities were set to begin upon completion of the CDF, and planned to be carried out over a period of 10 years to finally return the harbor to its authorized dredge depths, with an additional 20 years of maintenance dredging to remove future accumulated sediments. The total cost of the project was originally estimated at $180 million. Dredging did not, however, commence until 2012, fully forty years after the canal was last dredged. Phase 1 dredging was completed in November 2020. Construction of Phase 2 began in July 2021 and is expected to continue until November 2023.

== See also ==
- Calumet River – Grand Calumet River Area of Concern
