= Port Washington Light =

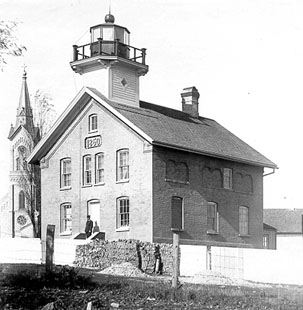
- Undated photograph of the Port Washington Light (USCG)
- Location: Overlooking Port Washington harbor
- Coordinates: 43.391°N 87.8677°W

Tower
- Constructed: 1849
- Foundation: Stone
- Construction: Brick (first); Brick (second)
- Height: 11 m (36 ft)
- Shape: Round tower (first); Rectangular house with tower on roof (second)
- Heritage: National Register of Historic Places listed place

Light
- First lit: 1849 (first tower); 1860 (second tower)
- Deactivated: 1903
- Focal height: 34 m (112 ft)
- Port Washington Light Station
- U.S. National Register of Historic Places
- Location: 311 E. Johnson St., Port Washington, Wisconsin
- Architectural style: Greek Revival
- NRHP reference No.: 99001222
- Added to NRHP: September 29, 1999

The Port Washington Light is a historical lighthouse in Port Washington, Wisconsin. Replaced by the Port Washington Breakwater Light and converted to a normal dwelling, it was restored with the assistance of the Grand Duchy of Luxembourg and currently serves as a museum.

== History ==
Requests for a lighthouse for the harbor were first presented to Congress in 1845, and in 1848 $3,500 was appropriated for construction. This light was completed in 1849 and consisted of a tower and separate keeper's house, both constructed of Cream City brick. The tower was somewhat over 35 feet (11 m) tall and was equipped with an array of five Lewis lamps with 14-inch (360 mm) reflectors. It was lit for the first time on May 8, 1849. In 1856 a sixth-order Fresnel lens was installed. This lamp was 36 feet (11 m) from the ground and 109 feet (33 m) above the water.

Starting in 1859 the lighthouse was "rebuilt". In fact, a more or less entirely new brick structure was constructed, reusing some elements and materials of the older dwelling. The design of the new house, of two-stories with roof tower, was also used for the Pilot Island Light and others in the area. A sixth-order lens was to be installed, thought to be retained from the previous light; However, it is known that a fourth order lens was installed in 1870. This lens, at 113 feet (34 m) above the water, gave the light a range of 16 nautical miles; 29 kilometres (18 mi).

The 1859 building housed one keeper and his family. An office was on the first floor and a watch room on the second. Charles Lewis Sr. was the keeper from 1874 to 1880, when he died. His wife took over briefly, then his son Charles Lewis Jr. maintained Port Washington's lights for many years.

With the dredging and enlargement of the harbor in the late 1800s, the Port Washington Breakwater Light was first lit in 1889. This tower was unmanned and was maintained by the keepers of the older light. By 1903, it was clear that only one light was needed, and the old Port Washington Light was discontinued. Keeper Charles Lewis, Jr. retired in 1924 upon the electrification of the pierhead light, but apparently continued to live in the old house. In 1934, however, a new steel tower was installed on the breakwater, and this light required manual maintenance of its foghorns. The old light was remodeled to house the new set of keepers, including the removal of the tower and all its interior supports. When the breakwater light was fully automated in 1975–76, the old light continued to house other Coast Guard personnel until 1993, when the building was turned over to the Port Washington Historical Society, first on a leased basis and then in 1997 in full ownership.

== Restoration ==
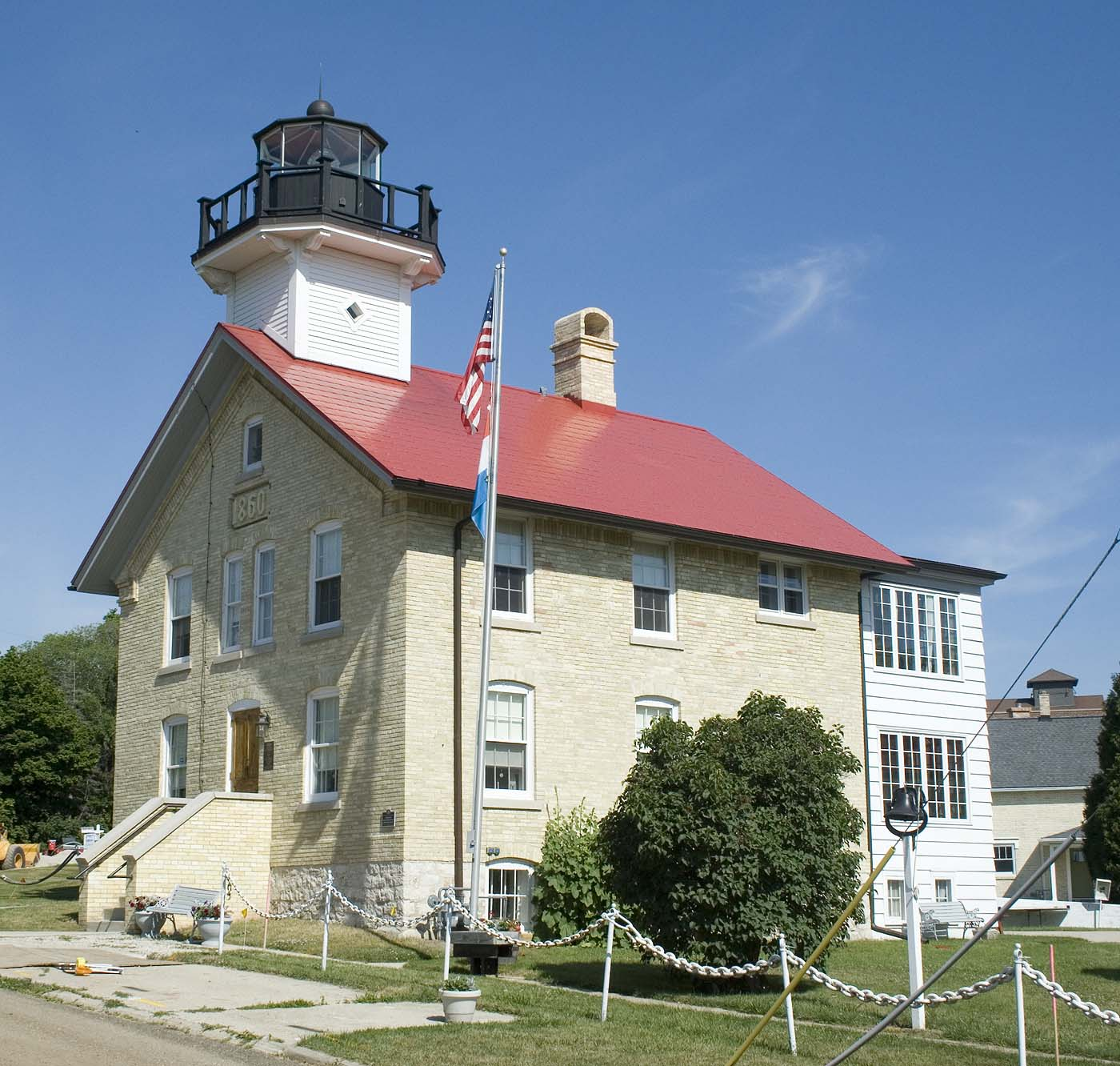
The restored lighthouse

The Port Washington area was home to many Luxembourgish immigrants, and in 2000 the Luxembourg Minister of Sites and Monuments visited the area. Upon touring the old light, he offered, on behalf of the Grand Duchy, to provide a replacement tower and lantern in order to restore the light to its original appearance, as a memorial to United States servicemen who fought in the tiny country in World War II. The historical society succeeded in raising the necessary funds to complete restoration, and in March 2002 the new tower arrived from Luxembourg and was installed; the restored light was dedicated on June 16, 2002. A replacement, newly made Fresnel lens was installed in 2007. The restored lighthouse contains a museum of lighthouse-keeping life.

The building was placed on the National Register of Historic Places in 1999.
