= Charity Island Light =

Lighthouse in Michigan, United States

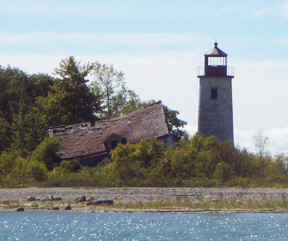
- Historic deteriorated Charity Island Light (before the rebuilding)
- Location: Big Charity Island, Michigan
- Coordinates: 44°01′53″N 83°26′08″W

Tower
- Constructed: 1857
- Construction: Brick
- Height: 45 feet (14 m)
- Shape: Frustum of a cone
- Markings: White with black lantern

Light
- First lit: 1857
- Deactivated: 1939
- Focal height: 45 feet (14 m)
- Lens: Fourth-order Fresnel lens
- Range: 13 nautical miles (24 km; 15 mi)

Charity Island Light is a lighthouse on Big Charity Island in Lake Huron just off the coast of Au Gres, Northern Michigan.

== History ==
In 1838, the region was the source of lumber being removed from Lower Michigan via the rivers that enter the lower end of Saginaw Bay. The shoals around Charity Island were a major source of problems, posing an obstacle to lumber vessels. It was not until 1856, however, that funds were allocated to establish a light on the island.

The octagonal cast iron lantern displayed a fixed white Fourth Order Fresnel lens light which was constructed in 1857 with a 39-foot (12 m) tower which provided a 13-nautical-mile (24 km; 15 mi) range of visibility. The Lighthouse Board was in the process of constructing a set of lights up and down the coast, and 13 nautical miles was considered adequate both to keep boats off the island and to navigate from one light to the next.

It was originally equipped with a white, Fourth Order Fresnel lens. Fourth order Fresnel lenses were 28 inches (710 mm), with a focal length of 9.8 inches (250 mm), and used 5 ounces (140 g) of oil per hour. Although a lens in that configuration had a range of up to 15 nautical miles (28 km; 17 mi), the Charity Island lens had a range of 13 nautical miles. In 1900, an acetylene lens replaced the 4th order lens. The lights characteristic changed from steady white light to a flashing light, at 10 second intervals. "Charity Island lighthouse was the first on the Great Lakes to receive such a light

The light was fully automated in 1900.

The original lighthouse keeper’s quarters was a wood duplex; attached by a walkway was the tower. In 1907, the tower was extended to 45 feet (14 m) and the dwelling gained a second story. In 1917 the site was the first to be automated with an acetylene lamp.

The light was abandoned since 1939 when Gravelly Shoal was lit, and it rapidly fell apart. It wound up on the Lighthouse Digest "Doomsday List" and required rehabilitation.

The Nature Conservancy is said to own the tower.

Alternatively, another source states that the tower is owned by the U.S. Fish & Wildlife Service and operated by the Arenac County Historical Society.

== Present status ==
The Charity Island Preservation Committee of the Arenac County Historical Society is restoring the tower. The original keeper's house was razed, and a new restored private residence has been built in its place and on its foundation. It is being operated as a restaurant and a bed and breakfast. A full list of past keepers of the light is maintained for historical reference.

== Access ==
It is hard to get close enough to this light to see it. In this area, Lake Huron is quite shallow and rocky, and the light is too far out to be seen from shore. Getting a boat near it requires a motor, oars or a long paddle, and considerable care.

However, tours of the island are commercially available on a vessel named the Miss Charity Isle. Previously, dinner trips through Charity Island Transport Inc. in Au Gres used to allow people to see Gravelly Shoal Light up close, tour the light keeper’s house on the island (before it became an Airbnb), and eat dinner on the island. Today, the day trips now leave from Brown’s Landing RV Park in Alabaster. More details on a day trip to the island can be found at CharityIsland.net.

== See also ==
- Lighthouses in the United States
