= Gravelly Shoal Light =

Lighthouse in Michigan, United States

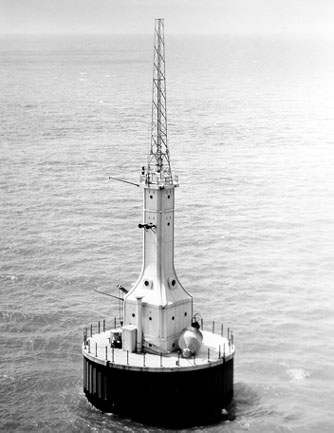
- Undated USCG photo
- Location: Saginaw Bay, Michigan
- Coordinates: 44°1′6″N 83°32′14″W

Tower
- Constructed: 1939
- Foundation: 50-foot (15 m) diameter concrete pier
- Construction: Steel-sided tower
- Height: 65 feet (20 m)
- Shape: Art Deco
- Markings: white, gray scaffold atop
- Fog signal: Every 30 seconds, operates year round. Radio beacon signal transmitted at 296 kHz, and emitted a group of 0.5 -second dashes for 15.5 seconds, followed by 14.5 seconds of silence.
- Racon: oui

Light
- First lit: 1939
- Focal height: 75 feet (23 m)
- Lens: 14.8-inch (375 mm) lens
- Intensity: 15,000 candela
- Range: 9.6 nautical miles; 18 kilometres (11 mi)
- Characteristic: red flash every 6 seconds

Gravelly Shoal Light is an automated lighthouse that is an active aid to navigation on the shallow shoals extending southeast from Point Lookout on the western side of Saginaw Bay. The light is situated about 2.7 miles (4.3 km) offshore and was built to help guide boats through the deeper water between the southeast end of Gravelly Shoals and Charity Island. Architecturally this is considered to be Art Deco style.

== History ==
As part of President Roosevelt's New Deal and its program to "Put America Back to Work" the new light tower was put up for bid, and built in 1939. It replaced an earlier gas-lit buoy. It also displaced the Charity Island Light, which was constructed in 1857, and operated until 1930.

Contemporary unmanned lights in the Art Deco style are the Indiana Harbor East Breakwater Light and its twin, the better known Port Washington Breakwater Light in Wisconsin.

When built according to its original specifications, the contractor warned that the foundation was inadequate to withstand the buildup of ice, and put in a bid for a contract modification. However, at the time jurisdiction over the light had just been transferred to the Coast Guard from the United States Lighthouse Service, and they chose to disregard the warning, and to accept the light as built. This resulted in substantial additional expense in due course, as the light had to be retrofitted.

This light is designed as an autonomous automated electrified station. It is under the control and maintenance of Coast Guard Station in Tawas City, Michigan. Ordinarily it displays a 15,000 candela 14.8 inches (375 mm) light powered by a 120 volt electric lamp. Power is supplied through a submarine cable, which crosses the shoal from Point Lookout. The 75-foot (23 m) focal plane makes its flash (1-second every 5 seconds) visible for 14 nautical miles; 26 kilometres (16 mi). It is supplemented by a standby 110 candela acetylene light with a half second flash every three seconds—which activates automatically if there is a power failure. In foggy weather, mariners are warned by twin compressed-air two-tone #3 diaphones, which operate on a 30-second cycle (3-second blast followed by 27 seconds of silence).

The National Data Buoy Center lists the Site Elevation as 588 feet (179.2 m) above sea level; an automatic readout for wind, waves and weather is operated there.

The National Weather Service operates an automated weather observing station at the lighthouse.

An added large steel tower atop the light is a radio beacon. The 1953 Coast Guard Light List indicates that the signal transmitted at 296 kHz, send forth a group of half-second dashes for 15.5 seconds, followed by 14½ seconds of silence. As of 2001, both the light and radio beacon served as active navigational aids.

Although it never had a resident lighthouse keeper, this light is a recognized 'significant light" by the National Park Service National Maritime Initiative.

In July 2015, the light was for sale through an online GSA auction process.

== Viewing ==
A good passing view of the light can be had while riding the ferry from Au Gres to Charity Island, which is 10 miles (16 km) to the east in the middle of Saginaw Bay. Tours of Charity Island are available, which include seeing the rebuilt Charity Island Light lightkeeper's house (currently an Airbnb) and seeing the native plants and birds on the western part of the island. More information about a tour to Charity Island can be found at CharityIsland.net.

It is also possible to take a telephoto shot from the shore of mainland Arenac County.

US 23 north from Au Gres, 4.8 miles (7.7 km) to Point Lookout Road. Turn right to its end; turn left onto Michigan Ave. Through a break in the houses one can see Saginaw Bay and the light.

== See also ==
- Lighthouses in the United States
