= Charity Island (Michigan) =

Island in Saginaw Bay, Michigan, US

- Location within Michigan

Geography
- Location: Saginaw Bay
- Coordinates: 44°01′53″N 83°26′08″W
- Area: 0.347 sq mi (0.90 km^{2})
- Coastline: 3 mi (5 km)

Administration
- United States
- State: Michigan
- County: Arenac County
- Township: Whitney Township

Charity Island, also known as Big Charity Island, is the largest island in Saginaw Bay, in the Michigan waters of Lake Huron. The island is 222 acres (0.90 km^{2}) in area and has about 3 miles (4.8 km) of shoreline. It is part of Whitney Township, in Arenac County. The island also contains an 11-acre (0.04 km^{2}) pond, literally a 'lake within a lake', fed by springs.

The island was named by lake mariners for its location, placed 'through the charity of God' at the entrance to Saginaw Bay midway between the city of Au Gres, Michigan and "The Thumb". The islands were not known as the Charity Islands until after 1845. Maps before 1800 show the islands unnamed. According to an 1839 map, Big Charity Island was referred to as Shawangunk, while Little Charity Island was known as Ile de Traverse.

The island is largely forested, mainly with mixed hardwoods. The humid ecoclimate is friendly to a diverse herbarium, including some rare plant species. Its isolated beaches and unique hardwood forest provides excellent habitat for a variety of plants and animals. Many rare and protected species of plants grow on the Island including Pitcher's thistle, acres of Trillium, Jack in the Pulpit, and Pink Lady Slippers. The island is best known among mariners for its former lighthouse. Charity Island Light was constructed in 1857. It operated in 1857-1930 and was then replaced by the Gravelly Shoal Light.

The island was offered for sale in 1987 for $750,000. In 1993 it was purchased by Standish real estate broker Robert Wiltse and other investors with plans consisting of 24 large houses. After accepting 15 deposits and constructing a harbor, Wiltse changed his mind about the development. In 1997, he sold more than 80% of the island to the U.S. Fish and Wildlife Service as an addition to the Michigan Islands National Wildlife Refuge (MINWR) system, and a few acres to The Nature Conservancy (which also bought the lighthouse from the government).

Geologically, the island contains pockets of chert that are believed to have been quarried by Native Americans. Offshore, the gravel reefs to the south creates a shallow-water channel separating Charity Island from its smaller neighbor, Little Charity Island. The area between the two islands is a favorite spot for fishing. On the northeast end of the island, a small bay is lined with limestone bedrock, offering good holding ground as a place to anchor during storms. The harbor of refuge is accessible by small boat, though access is controlled by the U.S. Fish and Wildlife Service.

A day trip to the island is available through CharityIsland.net. The tour departs from Brown’s Landing RV Park in Alabaster. They used to run a dinner trip to the island from both Au Gres and Caseville, but it was discontinued in the late 2010’s. Today, the day trip consists of walking through the woods, seeing the historic lighthouse (now an Airbnb), and eating at the pavilion nearby. More details about going on a day trip to the island can be found at CharityIsland.net.
