= Port Washington Downtown Historic District =

Historic district in Wisconsin, US

- U.S. National Register of Historic Places
- U.S. Historic district
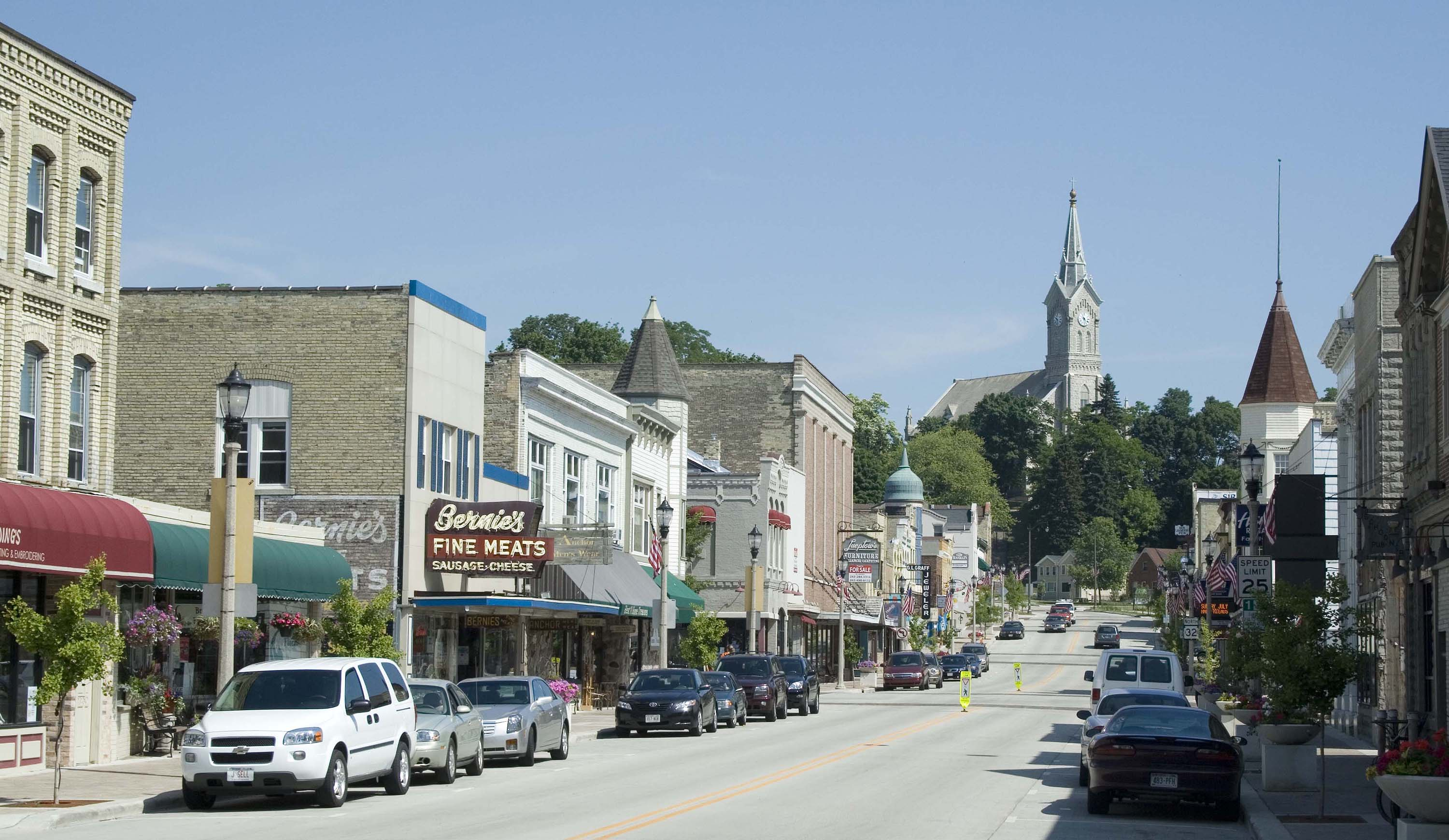
- A portion of the district.

- Location within Wisconsin
- Location: Port Washington, Wisconsin
- Coordinates: 43.388987°N 87.869303°W
- NRHP reference No.: 00001070
- Added to NRHP: September 8, 2000

The Port Washington Downtown Historic District is the largely intact remainder of the old commercial downtown of Port Washington, Wisconsin, United States. It consists of about 40 contributing buildings built from the 1850s to the 1950s in various styles. The district was added to the National Register of Historic Places in 2000 for significance to both architecture and the history of commerce.

Port Washington was founded in 1835, when Wooster Harrison and several other land speculators laid out a town on the sheltered slope where Sauk Creek flows into Lake Michigan. After some early growing pains, it became a village in 1848, and in 1851 740 ships docked at the pier. By 1853 the population was 1500. In 1873 the village was reached by the Milwaukee, Lakeshore and Western Railroad. In 1882 the city incorporated, and in 1889 the Wisconsin Chair Co. was founded, which was the major employer for many years.

Here is a sample of interesting buildings in the district:

- The 1854 Barnum Blake building at 201 N Franklin St is a 2-story brick building in Italianate style, but its round arches seem to fit the Rundbogenstil designs then fashionable with German immigrants in Milwaukee.
- The Wisconsin House Hotel at 308-312 N Franklin St is a 3-story Italianate brick hotel built in 1855. By 1885 a saloon occupied the north half and a harness shop the south. The 1-story section to the south was added in 1926.
- The Theodore Nosen Building at 329-333 N Franklin St is a 3-story brick Federal Style building, built in 1857.
- The 1891 Michael Bink saloon at 231 N Franklin St is a very intact 2-story Queen Anne-styled building with a two-story corner turret topped by an onion dome and a finial.
- The 1891 Wilson Hotel at 200-202 N Franklin St is a 3-story Queen Anne building, also with a corner turret and final.
- The Martin Zimmerman saloon at 114 N Franklin St is built of concrete block, with a Richardsonian Romanesque influence.
- The First National Bank at 122 N Franklin St is a Neoclassical bank designed by William Hilgen of Cedarburg and built in 1909, covered with white terra cotta tiles.
- The Matthew Schumacher Monument Co. at 302 N Franklin St is a 1-story Art Deco building built in 1930. It was designed by Edgar Berners, a native son of Port Washington and a partner in Foeller, Schober & Berners of Green Bay.
- The Schanen office building at 125 E Main St was designed in Art Moderne-style by Foeller, Schober and Berners and built in 1942. It housed William F. Schanen's law office and the Ozaukee Press, which was run by his son.
- The Smith Bros. Restaurant at 100 N Franklin St is a late Colonial Revival building designed by William J. Ames of Milwaukee and built in 1954.

Leland Stanford, who went on to become a U.S. Senator and Governor of California and found Stanford University, once practiced law in the district.
