= Port Washington, Wisconsin =

City and county seat of Ozaukee County, Wisconsin

- City
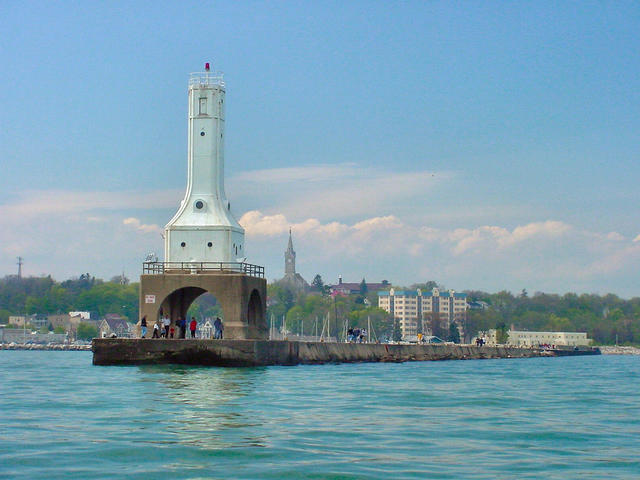
- Port Washington Pierhead Light, as viewed from Lake Michigan

- Flag

- Location of Port Washington in Ozaukee County, Wisconsin.

- Location within Wisconsin Location within the United States
- Coordinates: 43°23′36″N 87°52′52″W
- Country: United States
- State: Wisconsin
- County: Ozaukee
- Settled: 1835; 191 years ago
- Incorporated: 1882; 144 years ago

Government
  - Type: Mayor-council
  - Mayor: Ted Neitzke IV
  - Administrator: Melissa Gossett
  - Clerk: Susan Westerbeke
  - Treasurer: Mark Emanuelson
  - City council: Aldermen: Deborah Postl; Paul Neumyer; Michael Gasper; Dan Benning; Jonathan Pleitner; Patrick Tearney; John Sigwart

Area
  - Total: 5.86 sq mi (15.19 km^{2})
  - Land: 5.86 sq mi (15.19 km^{2})
  - Water: 0 sq mi (0.00 km^{2})

Population (2020)
  - Total: 12,353
  - Density: 2,031.3/sq mi (784.29/km^{2})
- Time zone: UTC-6 (Central (CST))
  - Summer (DST): UTC-5 (CDT)
- ZIP Code: 53074
- Area code: 262
- FIPS code: 55-64450
- Website: portwashingtonwi.gov

Port Washington is a city in Ozaukee County, Wisconsin, United States, and its county seat. Located on Lake Michigan's western shore east of Interstate 43, the community is a suburb in the Milwaukee metropolitan area 27 miles (43 km) north of Milwaukee. The city's artificial harbor at the mouth of Sauk Creek was dredged in the 1870s and was a commercial port until the early 2000s. The population was 12,353 at the 2020 census.

When French explorers arrived in the area in the 17th century, they found a Native American village at the mouth of Sauk Creek—the present location of historic downtown Port Washington. The United States Federal Government forcibly expelled the Native Americans in the 1830s, and the first settlers arrived in 1835, calling their settlement "Wisconsin City" before renaming it "Port Washington" in honor of President George Washington. In the late 1840s and early 1850s, the community was a candidate to be the Washington County seat. Disagreements between municipalities and election fraud prevented Washington County from having a permanent seat of government until the Wisconsin State Legislature intervened, creating Ozaukee County out of the eastern third of Washington County and making Port Washington the seat of the new county.

For much of its history, Port Washington has been tied to the Great Lakes. Early settlers used boats to transport goods including lumber, fish, and grains, although the community's early years were marred by shipwrecks, which led the U.S. Federal Government to construct Port Washington Harbor in 1871. Commercial fishing prospered in Port Washington until the mid-20th century, and beginning in the 1930s, the Port Washington Generating Station used the harbor to receive large shipments of coal to burn for electricity. The commercial harbor closed in 2004 when the power station switched to natural gas for fuel, but the community maintains an active marina for recreational boaters. In the 21st century, Port Washington celebrates its lacustrine heritage with museums, public fish fries, sport fishing derbies, and sailboat races.

== History ==
=== Early history and settlement ===
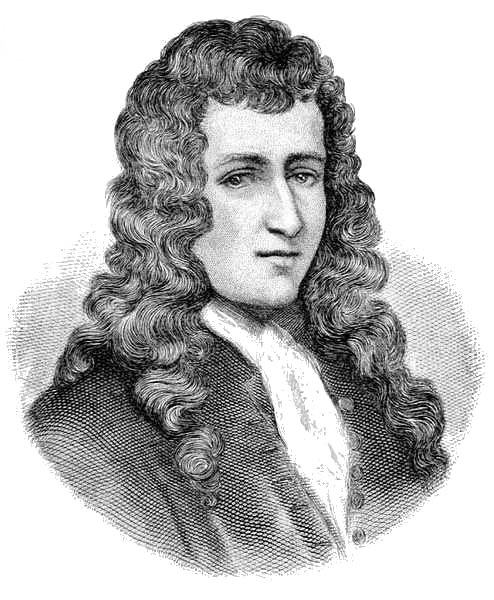
René-Robert Cavelier, Sieur de La Salle was one of the first Europeans to visit Port Washington.

The area that became Port Washington was originally inhabited by the Menominee, Potawatomi, and Sauk Native Americans. In 1679, the French explorers Louis Hennepin and René-Robert Cavelier, Sieur de La Salle described stopping at the first landing north of the Milwaukee River to procure provisions at a Potawatomi village at the mouth of a small river, which may have been Sauk Creek, a stream that empties into the present-day Port Washington's artificial harbor.

The 1830s saw the forced removal of Wisconsin's Native American population, followed by land speculation by merchants and investors. One of these land speculators was Wooster Harrison, who purchased the land that would become Port Washington in 1835, which he originally named "Wisconsin City." Harrison's wife, Rhoda, died in 1837 and was the first white settler to be buried in the town. The settlement was abandoned that same year.

In 1843, Harrison returned with a party of settlers. The Town of Port Washington was formed in January 1846 and until 1847 included the surrounding areas of Fredonia, Saukville, and Belgium. At the time, the land was part of Washington County, and in the late 1840s, Port Washington was a candidate for the county seat. However, the community was far from the county's other early settlements, including Mequon, Grafton and Germantown. In 1850, the Wisconsin legislature voted to bisect Washington County into northern and southern counties, with Port Washington and Cedarburg as the respective county seats. County residents failed to ratify the bill, and in 1853, the legislature instead bisected the county into eastern and western sections, creating Ozaukee County. Port Washington became the seat of the new county, and the Washington County seat moved to West Bend. The bisection was controversial. When Washington County officials from West Bend arrived in Port Washington to correct relevant county records, they were run out of town, and Ozaukee County officials refused to hand over the records for several months.

=== 19th century growth and industrialization ===
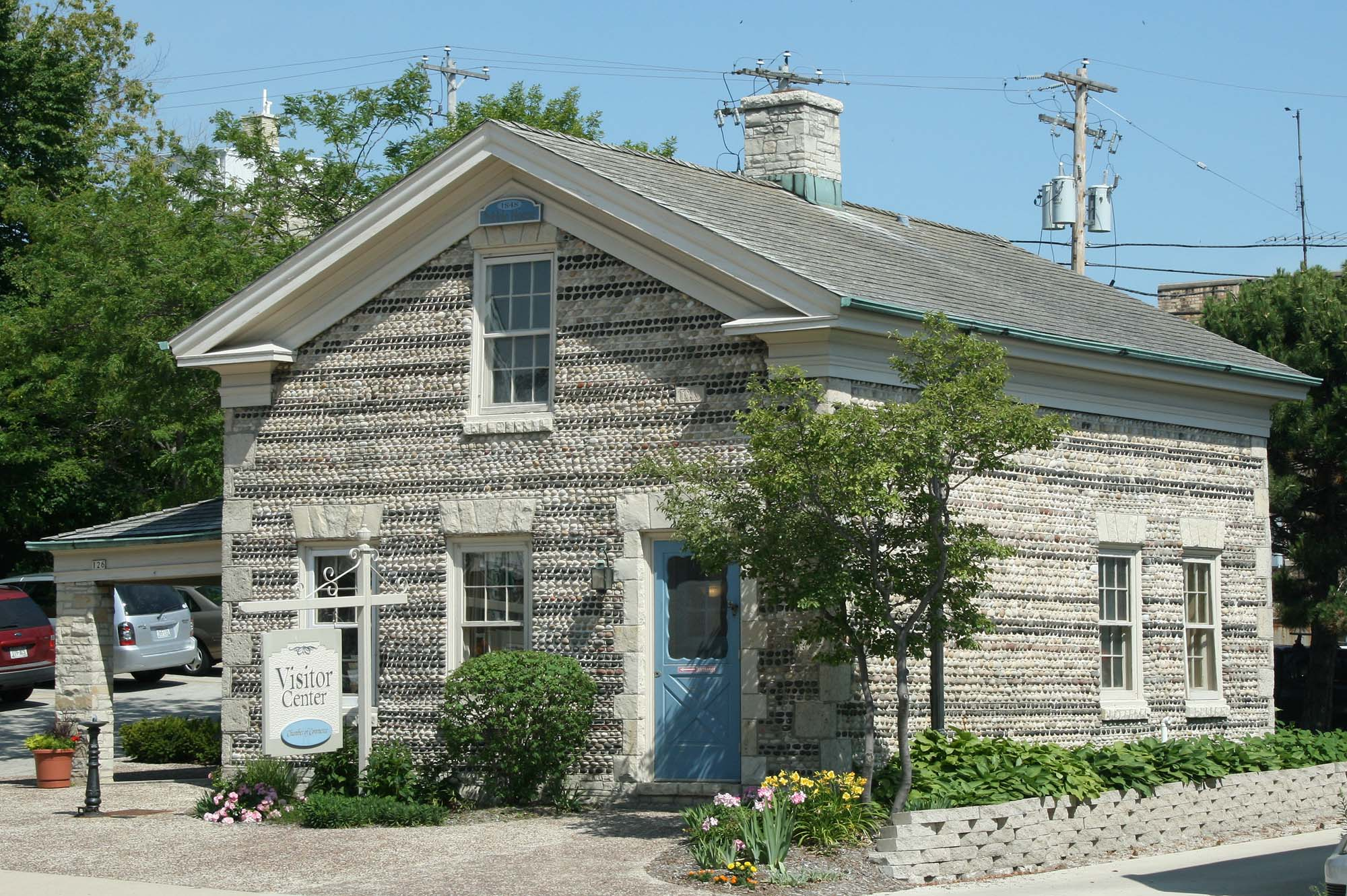
Historic Edward Dodge House, constructed in 1848

The early settlers saw potential in the community's lakeside location and built piers to make their city into a port on Lake Michigan. The city exported cord wood, wheat and rye flour, bricks, fish, and hides, among other things. However, Port Washington did not have a natural harbor and its first decades were marred by shipwrecks, including the 1856 Toledo disaster, in which between 30 and 80 people died.

In 1843, the first Christian religious services were held by the Methodist Episcopal Church in private homes. The first Catholic Church services were held in a similar manner in 1847. The Washington Democrat, the town's first newspaper, was started in 1847 by Flavius J. Mills.

The population reached 2,500 in 1853 and continued to increase, with an influx of immigrants from Germany and Luxembourg between 1853 and 1865. When the American Civil War started, some of these immigrants found themselves in opposition to the federal government. The United States Congress implemented the draft in 1862, and Port Washington's immigrants, particularly those from Prussia and Luxembourg, were unpleasantly reminded of mandatory conscription in the countries they had left behind. On November 10, 1862, several hundred Port Washington residents marched on the courthouse, attacked the official in charge of implementing the draft, burned draft records, and vandalized the homes of Union supporters. The riot ended when eight detachments of Union troops from Milwaukee were deployed.

The early 1870s saw improvements to the community's transportation infrastructure. In 1870, Port Washington became a stop on the Lake Shore Railroad, which was later incorporated into the Chicago and North Western Railway. In response to the numerous shipwrecks in the area, local officials also petitioned the federal government for assistance to dredge and create an artificial harbor. When the project was completed in 1871, the harbor was a channel 14 feet (4.3 meters) deep and 1,500 feet (460 meters) long in which ships could dock to unload as well as shelter during storms.

The City of Port Washington was incorporated in 1882. In the 1880s and 1890s, a large number of French and Belgian immigrants arrived in Port Washington. Between 1900 and 1910, two relatively large groups of English immigrants also arrived in Port Washington. One group came directly from England and the other group had previously been residents of Canada.

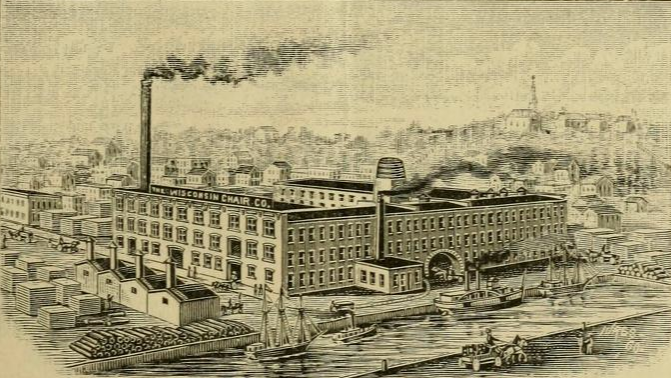
The Wisconsin Chair Company's original factory was destroyed in a massive fire on February 19, 1899. The company rebuilt and stayed in business until 1954, holding the status of the county's largest employer in the early 20th century.

The last years of the 19th century saw Port Washington's economy become more industrial. In September 1888, J. M. Bostwick opened the Wisconsin Chair Company in the city. At its height, the company employed 30% of the county's population and accounted for roughly half of Port Washington's jobs. Between 1890 and 1900, Port Washington's population nearly doubled due to the company's success. Additionally, the Bolens tractor company built its main factory in the city in 1894, and in 1896, Delos and Herbert Smith brought their commercial fishing business to Port Washington. The Smith Bros. company grew to a fleet of gillnetting fishing tugs, and they sold fish, whitefish caviar, and burbot oil in addition to operating restaurants and a hotel.

On February 19, 1899, the Wisconsin Chair Company's factory caught fire. The building was destroyed and the conflagration spread, burning nearly half of Port Washington. The damages were covered by fire insurance, and the company built an even bigger factory on the waterfront with direct rail access.

=== 20th century industrial decline and suburbanization ===
In the early 20th Century, the Wisconsin Chair Company opened additional factories in neighboring communities and bought tracts of forest in Green Bay, Chambers Island, Harbor Springs, Michigan, and the Upper Peninsula of Michigan to supply wood. During the Panic of 1907 when there were currency shortages, the company's checks were treated as an informal currency in the community. Among its products, the company manufactured phonographs for Thomas Edison. In an effort to boost sales, the company also started its Paramount Records subsidiary, which was one of the first record labels devoted to African-American music. Paramount operated in neighboring Grafton until it closed in 1935 during the Great Depression. The Wisconsin Chair Company closed in 1954.

In November 1907, Port Washington became a stop on the Milwaukee-Northern interurban passenger line, and a power station on the lakefront provided electricity for the trains. The community was the halfway point between Milwaukee and the line's northern terminus in Sheboygan. In the 1920s, The Milwaukee Electric Railway and Light Company purchased the line and continued to operate it until March 28, 1948, when the Ozaukee County line declined due to increased use of personal automobiles and better roads.

Wisconsin Electric Power Company, now known as We Energies, built the Port Washington power plant in 1931. The project included an expansion of Port Washington's harbor and the construction of a large coal dock to accommodate the daily coal shipments the station received.

The mid-20th century saw a decline in commercial fishing on the Great Lakes. Populations of fish including herring, lake trout, lake whitefish, and yellow perch declined due to decades of overfishing, pollution, and the arrival of invasive species, such as the alewife, the parasitic sea lamprey, and the zebra mussel. The Smith Bros. fishing company closed in 1988, and when the Port Washington power station took its coal-fired boilers out of service in 2004 and converted to natural gas, Port Washington's harbor closed as a commercial port.

Despite the decline of decades-old industries, Port Washington experienced significant population growth during the suburbanization that followed World War II. Between 1940 and 1970, the population more than doubled, from 4,046 to 8,752, and the City of Port Washington annexed rural land from the surrounding Town of Port Washington and Town of Grafton for residential subdivisions. The construction of Interstate 43 west of Port Washington in the mid-1960s connected the city to neighboring communities and allowed more residents to commute for work.

On August 22, 1964, an F4 tornado touched down in Port Washington, totally destroying twenty houses and causing severe damage to thirty-four others in a newly constructed subdivision. No one died, but thirty people were reported to have been injured. There were approximately $2 million in damages, which would have been over $16 million as of November 2019, if adjusted for inflation.

== Geography ==
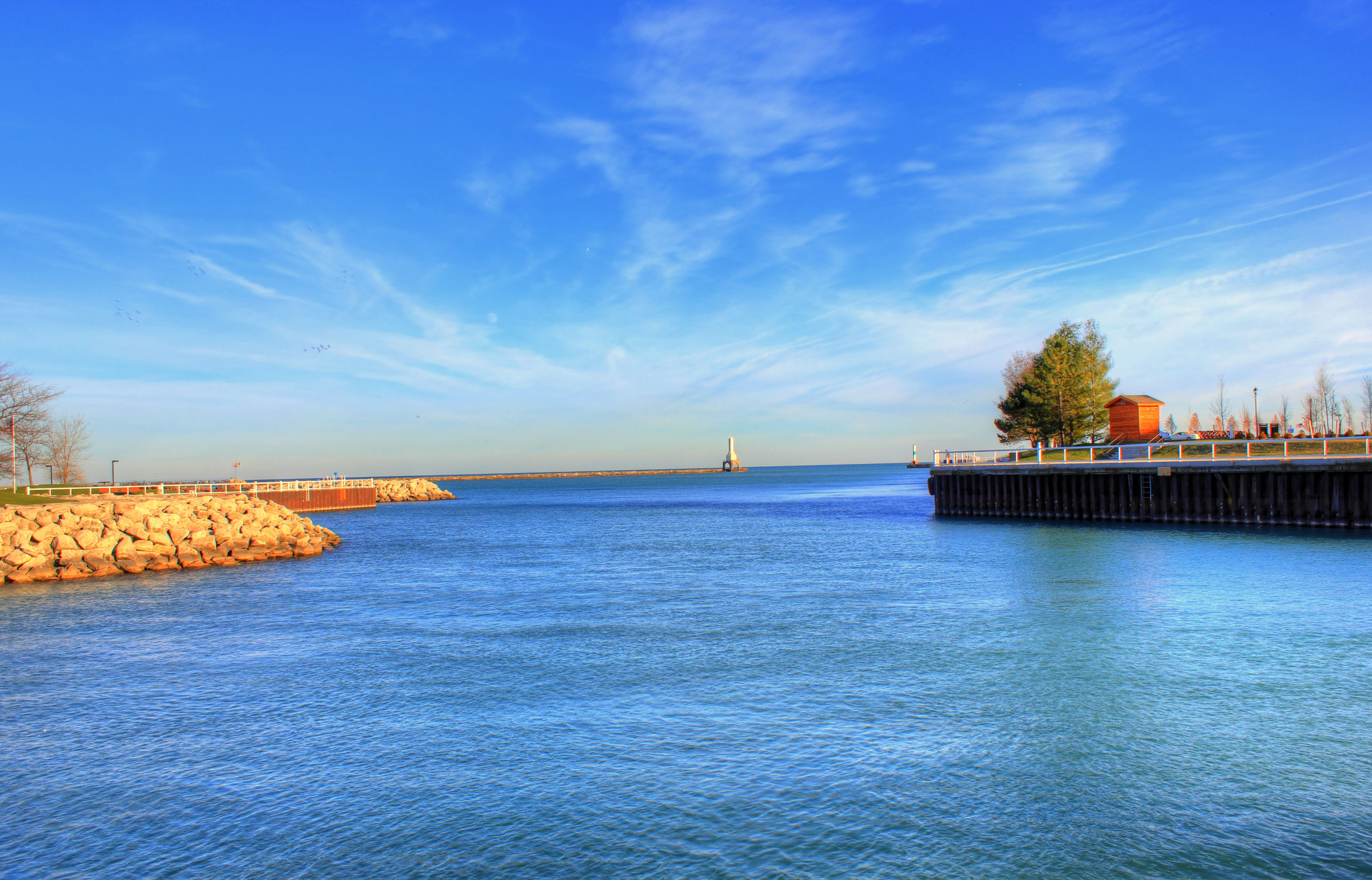
Port Washington harbor is surrounded by breakwaters to protect ships from strong waves.

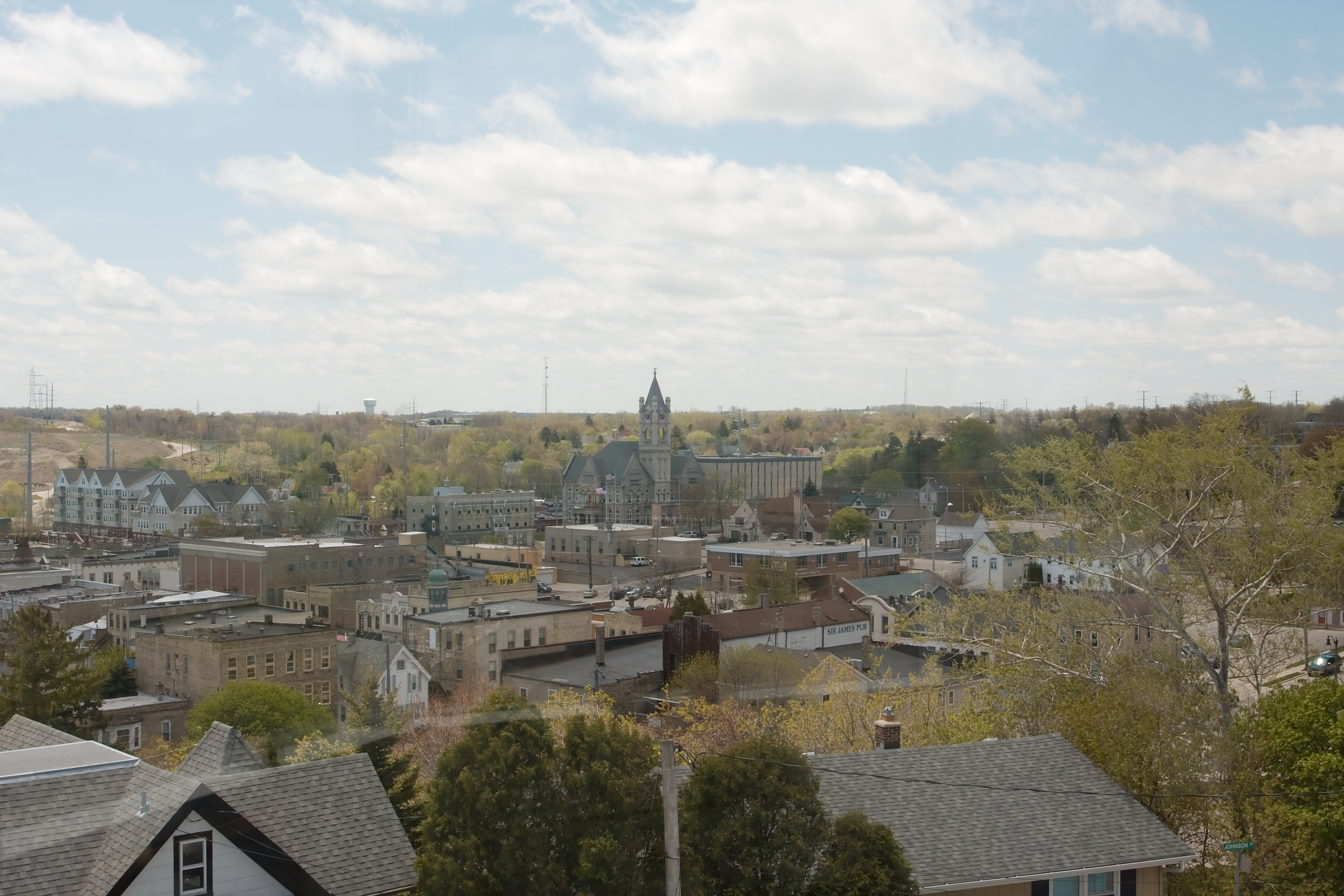
Downtown Port Washington as seen from one of the bluffs overlooking the city.

According to the United States Census Bureau, the city has a total area of 7.08 square miles (18.34 km^{2}), of which 5.82 square miles (15.07 km^{2}) is land and 1.26 square miles (3.26 km^{2}) is water. The city is bordered by the Town of Port Washington to the north and west, the Town of Grafton to the south, and Lake Michigan to the east.

The city is located on the western shore of Lake Michigan. In northern and southern parts of the city, the coastline is characterized by clay bluffs ranging from 80 feet (24 meters) to 130 feet (40 meters) in height with deep ravines where streams flow into the lake. Clay bluffs are a geological formation characteristic of the Lake Michigan shoreline, and are found in few other areas of the world. Much of the coastline adjacent to the bluffs has mixed gravel and sand beaches. Port Washington's historic downtown in the central part of the city is in the Sauk Creek valley, at a lower elevation than the rest of the city. The valley is a break in the bluffs, providing easy access to the lakeshore, which attracted early settlers to the area. Port Washington's artificial harbor, dredged in 1871 with subsequently constructed breakwaters, is located at the mouth of Sauk Creek, adjacent to downtown.

The city is located in the Southeastern Wisconsin glacial till plains that were created by the Wisconsin glaciation during the most recent ice age. The soil is clayey glacial till with a thin layer of loess on the surface. The Wisconsin Department of Natural Resources considers the city to be in the Central Lake Michigan Coastal ecological landscape.

As land development continues to reduce wild areas, wildlife is forced into closer proximity with human communities like Grafton. Large mammals, including white-tailed deer, coyotes, and red foxes can be seen in the city. There have been infrequent sightings of black bears in Ozaukee County communities, including a 2010 sighting of a bear in a Port Washington residential neighborhood.

The region struggles with many invasive species, including the emerald ash borer, common carp, reed canary grass, the common reed, purple loosestrife, garlic mustard, Eurasian buckthorns, and honeysuckles.

=== Climate ===
Climate data for Port Washington, Wisconsin (1991–2020 normals, extremes 1893–present)
| Month | Jan | Feb | Mar | Apr | May | Jun | Jul | Aug | Sep | Oct | Nov | Dec | Year |
|---|---|---|---|---|---|---|---|---|---|---|---|---|---|
| Record high °F (°C) | 59 (15) | 63 (17) | 82 (28) | 92 (33) | 95 (35) | 102 (39) | 106 (41) | 103 (39) | 100 (38) | 89 (32) | 76 (24) | 68 (20) | 106 (41) |
| Mean daily maximum °F (°C) | 30.8 (−0.7) | 33.5 (0.8) | 41.9 (5.5) | 51.0 (10.6) | 61.3 (16.3) | 71.5 (21.9) | 78.7 (25.9) | 78.4 (25.8) | 71.3 (21.8) | 59.2 (15.1) | 46.4 (8.0) | 35.8 (2.1) | 55.0 (12.8) |
| Daily mean °F (°C) | 22.7 (−5.2) | 24.6 (−4.1) | 33.7 (0.9) | 43.2 (6.2) | 53.0 (11.7) | 63.2 (17.3) | 70.1 (21.2) | 70.0 (21.1) | 62.5 (16.9) | 50.4 (10.2) | 38.5 (3.6) | 28.2 (−2.1) | 46.7 (8.2) |
| Mean daily minimum °F (°C) | 14.6 (−9.7) | 15.7 (−9.1) | 25.4 (−3.7) | 35.4 (1.9) | 44.8 (7.1) | 54.8 (12.7) | 61.5 (16.4) | 61.6 (16.4) | 53.7 (12.1) | 41.6 (5.3) | 30.6 (−0.8) | 20.5 (−6.4) | 38.4 (3.6) |
| Record low °F (°C) | −26 (−32) | −29 (−34) | −15 (−26) | 10 (−12) | 18 (−8) | 29 (−2) | 40 (4) | 36 (2) | 27 (−3) | 11 (−12) | −10 (−23) | −22 (−30) | −29 (−34) |
| Average precipitation inches (mm) | 1.76 (45) | 1.48 (38) | 1.91 (49) | 3.78 (96) | 3.90 (99) | 4.17 (106) | 3.61 (92) | 3.68 (93) | 3.08 (78) | 2.56 (65) | 2.13 (54) | 1.82 (46) | 33.88 (861) |
| Average snowfall inches (cm) | 13.2 (34) | 10.7 (27) | 6.0 (15) | 0.8 (2.0) | 0.0 (0.0) | 0.0 (0.0) | 0.0 (0.0) | 0.0 (0.0) | 0.0 (0.0) | 0.0 (0.0) | 0.9 (2.3) | 10.7 (27) | 42.3 (107) |
| Average precipitation days (≥ 0.01 in) | 8.1 | 6.7 | 7.7 | 9.9 | 11.1 | 10.4 | 8.7 | 8.1 | 7.8 | 9.1 | 7.6 | 7.8 | 103.0 |
| Average snowy days (≥ 0.1 in) | 6.4 | 5.1 | 2.7 | 0.5 | 0.0 | 0.0 | 0.0 | 0.0 | 0.0 | 0.0 | 0.9 | 4.6 | 20.2 |
Source: NOAA

== Demographics ==
Historical population
| Census | Pop. | Note | %± |
|---|---|---|---|
| 1880 | 1,386 | | — |
| 1890 | 1,649 | | 19.0% |
| 1900 | 3,010 | | 82.5% |
| 1910 | 3,792 | | 26.0% |
| 1920 | 3,340 | | −11.9% |
| 1930 | 3,693 | | 10.6% |
| 1940 | 4,046 | | 9.6% |
| 1950 | 4,755 | | 17.5% |
| 1960 | 5,984 | | 25.8% |
| 1970 | 8,752 | | 46.3% |
| 1980 | 8,612 | | −1.6% |
| 1990 | 9,338 | | 8.4% |
| 2000 | 10,467 | | 12.1% |
| 2010 | 11,250 | | 7.5% |
| 2020 | 12,353 | | 9.8% |
U.S. Decennial Census

=== 2020 census ===
As of the 2020 census, Port Washington had a population of 12,353. The median age was 41.0 years. 21.6% of residents were under the age of 18 and 19.4% of residents were 65 years of age or older. For every 100 females there were 95.2 males, and for every 100 females age 18 and over there were 92.6 males age 18 and over.

99.6% of residents lived in urban areas, while 0.4% lived in rural areas.

There were 5,221 households in Port Washington, of which 27.6% had children under the age of 18 living in them. Of all households, 48.9% were married-couple households, 17.0% were households with a male householder and no spouse or partner present, and 27.6% were households with a female householder and no spouse or partner present. About 32.0% of all households were made up of individuals and 14.4% had someone living alone who was 65 years of age or older.

There were 5,456 housing units, of which 4.3% were vacant. The homeowner vacancy rate was 0.7% and the rental vacancy rate was 3.2%.

Racial composition as of the 2020 census
| Race | Number | Percent |
|---|---|---|
| White | 11,220 | 90.8% |
| Black or African American | 256 | 2.1% |
| American Indian and Alaska Native | 42 | 0.3% |
| Asian | 153 | 1.2% |
| Native Hawaiian and Other Pacific Islander | 2 | 0.0% |
| Some other race | 99 | 0.8% |
| Two or more races | 581 | 4.7% |
| Hispanic or Latino (of any race) | 453 | 3.7% |

=== 2010 census ===
As of the census of 2010, there were 11,250 people, 4,704 households, and 2,956 families residing in the city. The population density was 1,933.0 inhabitants per square mile (746.3/km^{2}). There were 5,020 housing units at an average density of 862.5 per square mile (333.0/km^{2}). The racial makeup of the city was 95.0% White, 1.6% African American, 0.4% Native American, 0.7% Asian, 0.8% from other races, and 1.4% from two or more races. Hispanic or Latino of any race were 3.1% of the population.

There were 4,704 households, of which 29.2% had children under the age of 18 living with them, 51.0% were married couples living together, 8.3% had a female householder with no husband present, 3.5% had a male householder with no wife present, and 37.2% were non-families. 31.0% of all households were made up of individuals, and 11.9% had someone living alone who was 65 years of age or older. The average household size was 2.31 and the average family size was 2.91.

The median age in the city was 39.5 years. 22.4% of residents were under the age of 18; 7.6% were between the ages of 18 and 24; 28.2% were from 25 to 44; 27% were from 45 to 64; and 14.7% were 65 years of age or older. The gender makeup of the city was 49.0% male and 51.0% female.

=== 2000 census ===
As of the census of 2000, there were 10,467 people residing in Port Washington. The racial makeup of the city was 97.0% White, 0.7% Black or African American, 0.5% Asian, 0.4% Native American, 0% Pacific Islander, 0.6% from other races, and 0.89% from two or more races. 1.5% of the population were Hispanic or Latino of any race.

There were 3,244 families and 4,763 households, of which 34.0% had children under the age of 18 living with them, 57.5% were married couples living together, 7.4% had a female householder with no husband present and 31.9% were non-families. The householder lives alone in 26.3% of all households, and 10.5% of householders were aged 65 or older. The average household size was 2.49 and the average family size was 3.05.

In the city, the population was spread out, with 6.6% under the age of 5, 74.2% aged 18 and over, and 13.2% 65 years and over. The median age was 36.7 years. The population is 50.4% female and 49.6% male.

In 1999 the median income for a family was $62,557. The per capita income for the city was $24,770. About 2.6% of families and 4.0% of the population were below the poverty line.

== Economy ==
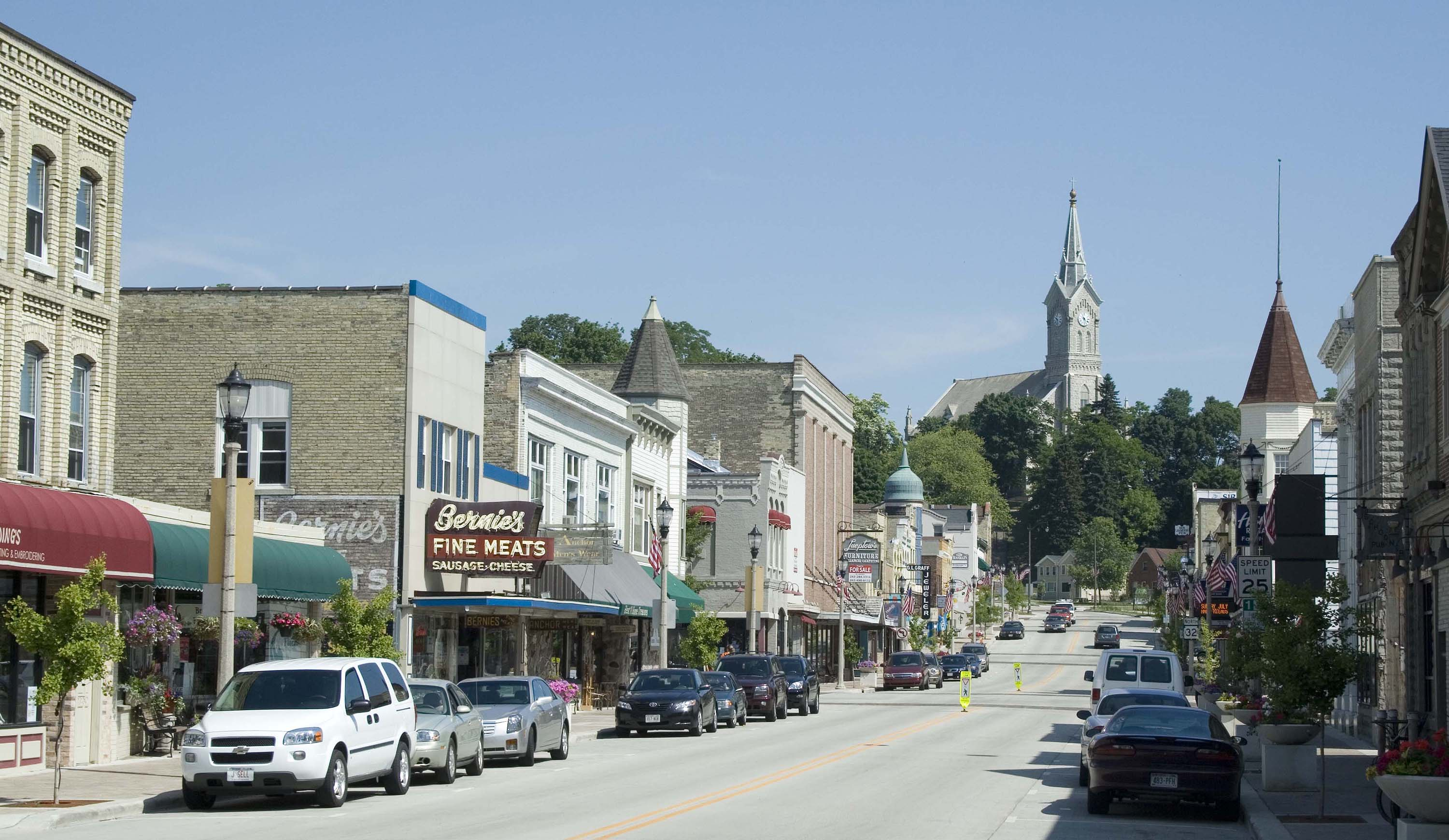
Downtown Port Washington includes many small businesses, including restaurants and retail stores.

Port Washington's early economy was heavily based on harvesting and shipping raw materials from natural resources, including lumber, fish, fur, wheat and rye, and beginning in the 1870s, dairy farming played an increasingly important role in the Town of Port Washington's economy with creameries and cheese factories in rural hamlets like Knellsville. By the mid-20th century, dairy farming accounted for 80% of agriculture in the Port Washington area.

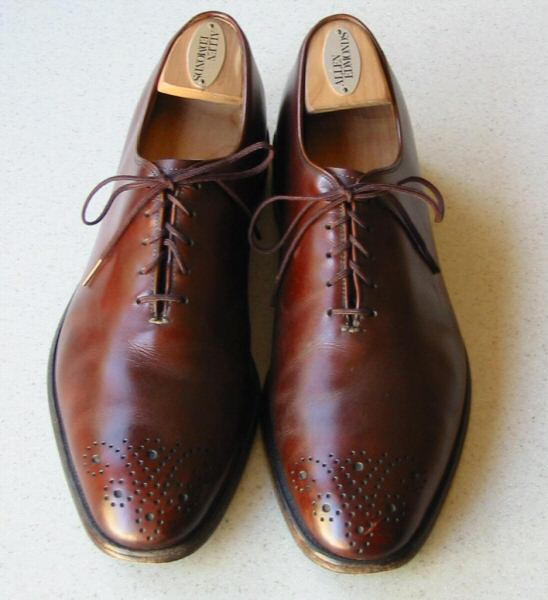
Allen Edmonds has its headquarters and shoe-assembly plant in Port Washington.

In the 1880s and 1890s, Port Washington became increasingly industrial, with the Wisconsin Chair Company being the largest employer. In the 20th century, other manufacturers in the community included Allen Edmonds, Bolens Corporation, Koering Co., Simplicity Manufacturing Company, and Trak International. While Allen Edmonds continues to manufacture high-end shoes in the city, many of the other manufacturers closed or were purchased by larger companies between the 1970s and 2000s. In 2001, MTD Products acquired the Bolens Corporation. In 2004, Briggs & Stratton purchased Simplicity Manufacturing and closed the Port Washington plant in October 2008. As of 2015, manufacturing accounted for approximately 25% of Port Washington's jobs, a significant decrease from the early 20th century when the Wisconsin Chair Company alone accounted for 50% of the city's jobs.

In the early 21st century, public administration plays a significant role in Port Washington's economy, accounting for approximately 20% of jobs. Port Washington is the Ozaukee County seat, and the county government is the largest employer in the city. The Port Washington city administration is also a major employer.

Largest Employers in Port Washington, 2015
| Rank | Employer | Industry | Employees |
|---|---|---|---|
| 1 | Ozaukee County | Public administration | 500–999 |
| 2 | Kleen Test Products | Cleaning product manufacturing | 250–499 |
| 3 | Allen Edmonds | Footwear and high-end apparel manufacturing | 250–499 |
| 4 | Kickhaefer Manufacturing Company | OEM metal fabrication and stamping | 250–499 |
| 5 | Port Washington-Saukville School District | Primary and secondary education | 100–249 |
| 6 | City of Port Washington | Public Administration | 100–249 |
| 7 | Franklin Energy Services | Energy efficiency consultant | 100–249 |
| 8 | Construction Forms Inc. | Pipe and pipe fitting manufacturing | 50–99 |
| 9 | Aurora Health Care | Health care | 50–99 |
| 10 | Heritage Nursing & Rehabilitation | Nursing care facility | 50–99 |

== Culture ==
=== Events ===
Port Washington hosts many annual events tied to the community's maritime heritage. Each year on January 1, the city is the site of a polar bear plunge in which over 100 people jump into Lake Michigan. Fish Day, billed as the "world's largest one-day outdoor fish fry," has been held annually since 1964 on the third Saturday in July. Hosted by several area philanthropic organizations, the event is a charity fundraiser. In the summer, Port Washington hosts a Festival of the Arts, as well as several yacht races and sport fishing competitions, one of which is part of the festival hosted by the area Lions Club.

The city also hosts public celebrations for Independence Day, Labor Day, Halloween, and Christmas.

=== Museums ===
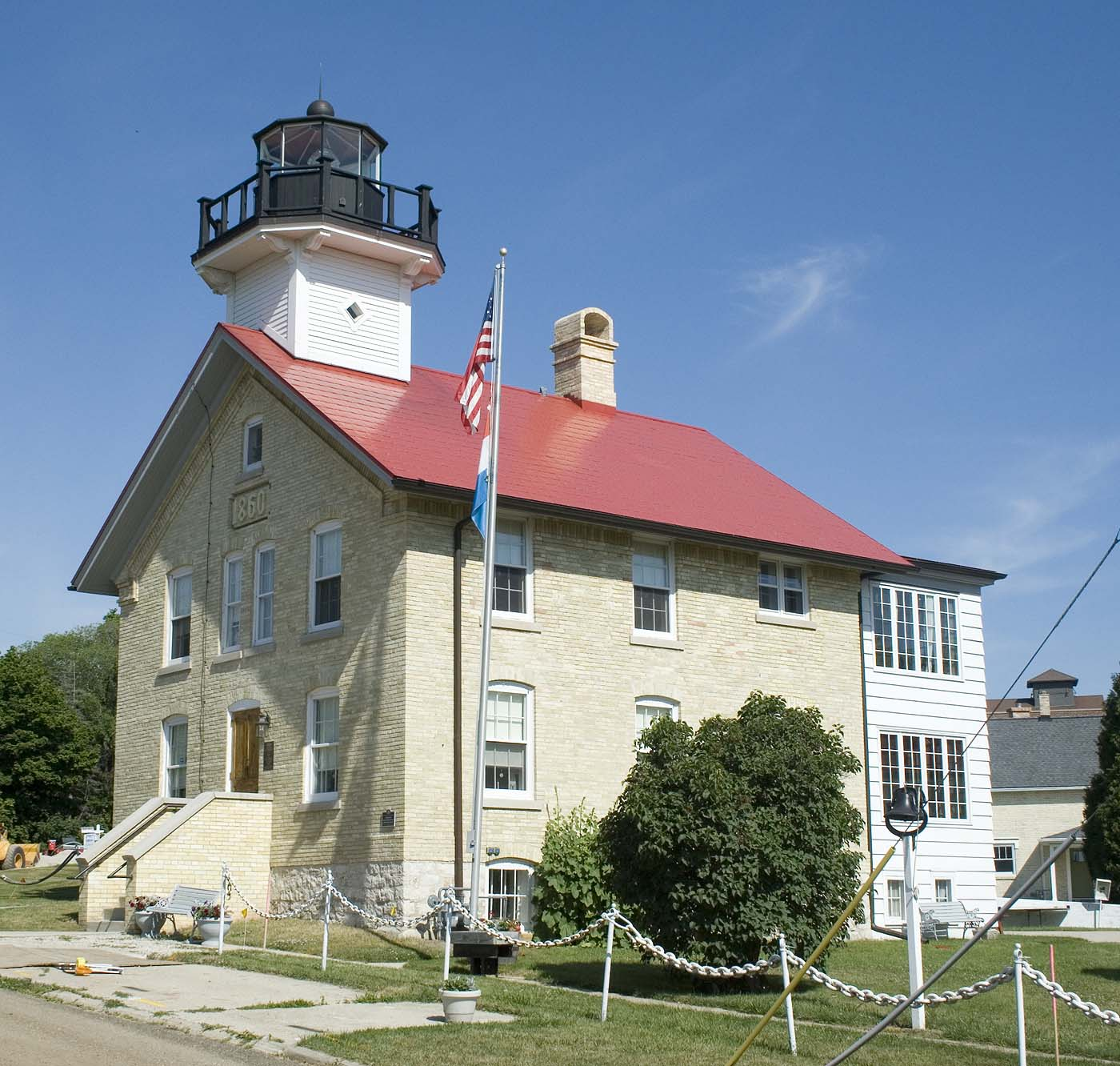
The 1860 Port Washington Light is a museum of maritime history and lighthouse-keeping, which includes a reproduction of a Fresnel lens.

- Judge Eghart House: Built in 1872, the Judge Eghart House museum is furnished with Victorian era artifacts to provide a snapshot of what life was like in late 19th century Port Washington.
- Port Washington Light: Port Washington's light station was constructed in 1860 to replace and earlier structure and is listed on the National Register of Historic Places. The government of the Grand Duchy of Luxembourg paid to restore the lighthouse in 2000, because of the cultural ties between northern Ozaukee County and Luxembourg. The building is a museum of 19th-century lighthouse keeping, and the Port Washington Historical Society runs tours on summer weekends.

=== Religion ===
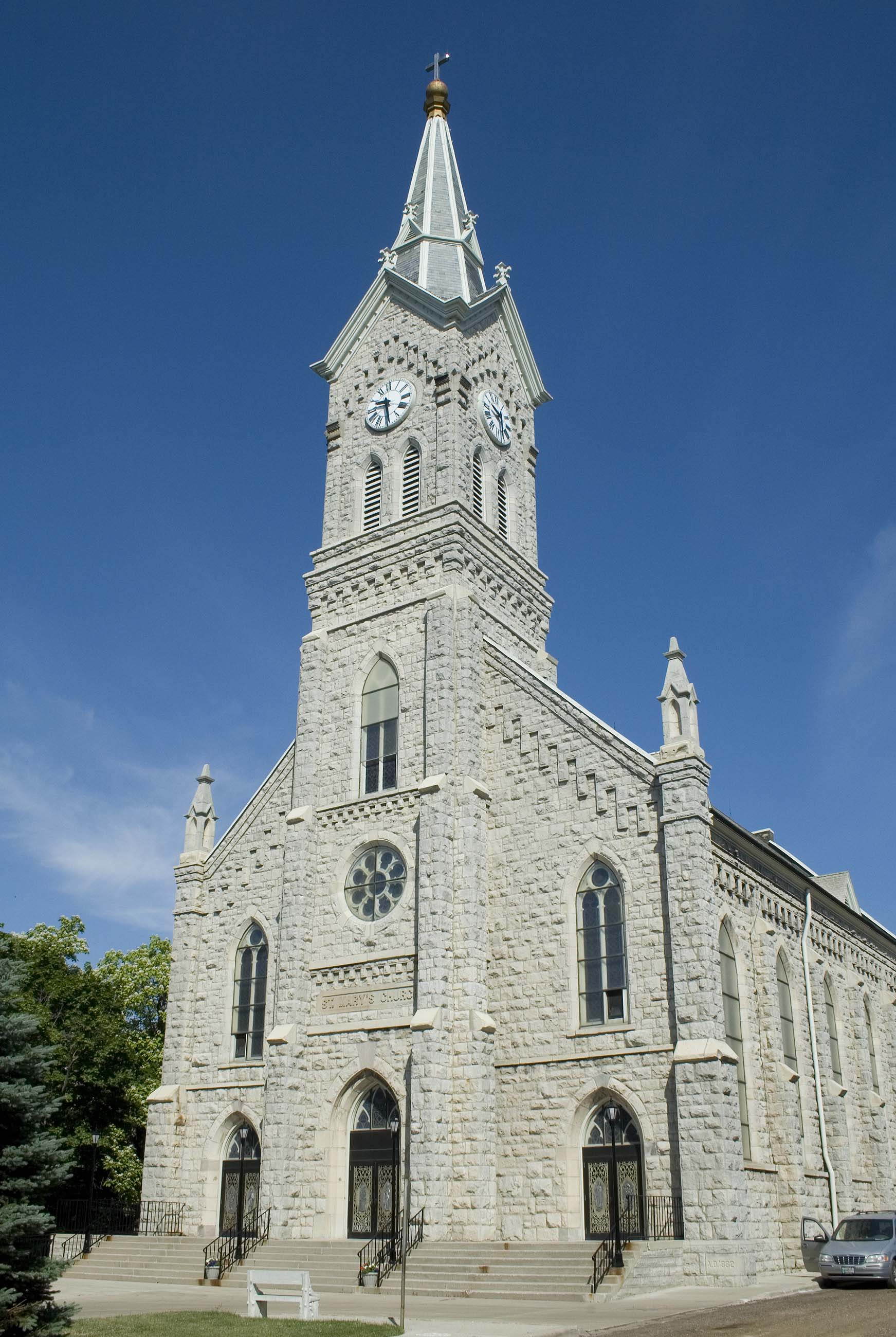
St. Mary's Catholic Church was built in 1882, although the congregation had existed since the late 1840s. In 2016, St. Mary's merged with two other area Catholic parishes to form St. John XXIII Catholic Parish.

The Port Washington area has three Lutheran congregations: Christ the King Lutheran Church, which is affiliated with the Evangelical Lutheran Church in America; St. John's Lutheran Church, which is affiliated with the Missouri Synod; and St. Matthew Evangelical Lutheran Church, which is affiliated with the Wisconsin Evangelical Lutheran Synod. In addition to Christ the King Lutheran Church, other mainline Protestant congregations include the First Congregational Church of Port Washington, Grand Avenue United Methodist Church, and St. Simon the Fisherman Episcopal Church. Faith Baptist Church is a denominational Protestant church in the community in the Continental Baptist tradition.

St. John XXIII Catholic Parish formed in 2016 from the merger of Port Washington's two historic Catholic churches—St. Mary's Church and St. Peter of Alcantara Church—with Immaculate Conception Catholic Church in neighboring Saukville. While the parish is one financial entity, the three church buildings remain in use, and the parish operates a parochial school for students from kindergarten through eighth grade.

There are two evangelical churches in the area: the Evangelical Free Church of America-affiliated Friedens Church and Portview Church. Open Door Bible Church is a Christian fundamentalist congregation in the community affiliated with IFCA International.

Port Washington also has a Church of Jesus Christ of Latter-day Saints and a Jehovah's Witnesses Kingdom Hall.

=== W. J. Niederkorn Library ===
The Port Washington Woman’s Club established the city's first public library in 1899, which got its own building in 1961, when area resident W. J. Niederkorn paid to construct it on Grand Avenue. It provides books, magazines, computers, printers, study rooms, databases, audiobooks, e-books, and language-learning software. It is a member of the Monarch Library System, comprising thirty-one libraries in Ozaukee, Sheboygan, Washington, and Dodge counties.

== Law and government ==
Port Washington has a mayor–council government. The mayor is Ted Neitzke IV, who was elected to his first term on April 6, 2021. Seven aldermen sit on the city council. A full-time staff of unelected administrators manage the city's day-to-day operations.

As part of Wisconsin's 6th congressional district, Port Washington is represented by Glenn Grothman (R) in the United States House of Representatives, and by Ron Johnson (R) and Tammy Baldwin (D) in the United States Senate. Jodi Habush Sinykin (D) represents Port Washington in the Wisconsin State Senate, and Paul Melotik (R) represents Port Washington in the Wisconsin State Assembly.

List of Mayors
| # | Mayor | Term in Office | Notes |
|---|---|---|---|
| 1 | James W. Vail | 1882–1883 | |
| 2 | Henry B. Schwin | 1883–1887 | |
| 3 | Henry W. Lyman | 1887–1888 | |
| 4 | Reinhard Stelling | 1887–1888 | |
| 5 | Charles A. Mueller | 1888–1892 | |
| 6 | Reinhard Stelling | 1892–1893 | |
| 7 | B. Biedermann | 1893–1895 | |
| 8 | Edward B. Bostwick | 1895–1896 | |
| 9 | Charles A. Mueller | 1896–1906 | |
| 10 | Harry W. Bolens | 1906–1908 | |
| 11 | Rheinhold E. Maercklein | 1908–1910 | |
| 12 | Harry W. Bolens | 1910–1914 | |
| 13 | John Kaiser Jr. | 1914–1923 | |
| 14 | George H. Adams | 1923 – August 9, 1923 | Resigned. |
| - | Adolph H. Kuhl | August 9, 1923 – January 9, 1924 | Acting mayor. |
| 15 | Albert W. Grady | January 9, 1924 – April 16, 1929 | |
| 16 | August F. Kruke | April 16, 1929 – April 18, 1939 | |
| 17 | John Kaiser Jr. | April 18, 1939 – April 17, 1945 | |
| 18 | George S. Cassels | April 17, 1945 – April 15, 1947 | |
| 19 | Charles Larson | April 15, 1947 – April 19, 1949 | |
| 20 | John Kaiser Jr. | April 19, 1949 – April 19, 1955 | |
| 21 | Paul Schmit | April 19, 1955 – April 25, 1961 | |
| 22 | Frank Meyer | April 25, 1961 – April 20, 1971 | |
| 23 | James R. Stacker | April 20, 1971 – April 13, 1977 | Died. |
| - | Robert Lorge | April 13, 1977 – May 17, 1977 | Acting. Resigned. |
| 24 | George Lampert | May 17, 1977 – April 19, 1988 | Acting mayor until April 1978. |
| 25 | Ambrose Mayer | April 19, 1988 – April 16, 1991 | |
| 26 | Mark Dybdal | April 16, 1991 – April 19, 1994 | |
| 27 | Joseph Dean | April 19, 1994 – April 1997 | |
| 28 | Mark Gottlieb | April 1997 – April 2003 | |
| 29 | Scott A. Huebner | April 2003 – April 2012 | |
| 30 | Tom Mlada | April 2012 – April 2018 | |
| 31 | Martin Becker | April 2018 – April 2021 | |
| 32 | Ted Neitzke IV | April 2021 – present | |

=== Mayoral Election Results ===
2009
| Candidates | Votes | Percentage |
|---|---|---|
| Scott A. Huebner (incumbent) | 1,434 | 97.41% |
| Write-in Votes | 38 | 2.59% |

2012
| Candidates | Votes | Percentage |
|---|---|---|
| Jim Vollmar | 1,370 | 46.66% |
| Tom Mlada | 1,555 | 52.96% |
| Write-in Votes | 11 | 0.37% |

2015
| Candidates | Votes | Percentage |
|---|---|---|
| Tom Mlada (incumbent) | 2,128 | 97.97% |
| Write-in Votes | 44 | 2.03% |

2018
| Candidates | Votes | Percentage |
|---|---|---|
| Martin Becker | 1,922 | 67.20% |
| Adele Richert | 928 | 32.45% |
| Write-in Votes | 10 | 0.35% |

2021
| Candidates | Votes | Percentage |
|---|---|---|
| Ted Neitzke IV | 1,796 | 64.63% |
| Dan Benning | 979 | 35.23% |
| Write-in Votes | 4 | 0.14% |

=== Fire department ===
The Port Washington Fire Department formed in 1852. The department operates one fire station on Washington Street and had fifty-nine personnel as of December 31, 2018. Mark Mitchell serves as fire chief. The department has four divisions: fire, emergency medical services, dive team, and rescue task force. The rescue task force was formed in 2016 as a collaboration between law enforcement and paramedics to prepare for a mass-casualty active shooter situation. It was the first such task force in Ozaukee County.

The department operates three ambulances, four fire engines, a water tanker, a Pierce heavy rescue truck, a Pierce ladder truck, a dive rescue boat, and a fireboat.

=== Police department ===
The Port Washington Police Department was established in 1882 when the city incorporated. The police station is located on Wisconsin Street in Downtown Port Washington. The department employs twenty sworn officers, including police chief Kevin Hingiss who has served with the department since 1984 and was appointed chief in 2012. Additionally, the department has a civilian support staff of three full-time records management employees, one municipal court clerk, one administrative assistant, one parking enforcement officer and one custodian.

== Education ==
Port Washington is served by the joint Port Washington-Saukville School District. The district has three elementary schools for kindergarten through fourth grade. Students in northern and eastern Port Washington attend Lincoln Elementary, while students southern and western neighborhoods attend Dunwiddie Elementary. Saukville Elementary serves students in the western parts of the Town of Port Washington and the Town and Village of Saukville. All students in the district attend Thomas Jefferson Middle School for fifth through eighth grades, and Port Washington High School for ninth through twelfth grades.

The district is governed by a nine-member elected school board, which meets on Mondays at 6 p.m. in the District Office Board Room, 100 W. Monroe Street, Port Washington. The district also has a full-time superintendent: Michael R. Weber.

Additionally, St. John XXIII Catholic Parish (of the Roman Catholic Archdiocese of Milwaukee) operates a parochial school in the city for students from kindergarten through eighth grade.

== Transportation ==
Interstate 43 passes around Port Washington to the city's west and north with access via Exit 100. Wisconsin Highway 32 passes north to south through the city while Wisconsin Highway 33 travels from the west before it terminates downtown. Wisconsin Highway 57 runs several miles west of Port Washington with a junction with Interstate 43 in the Village of Saukville.

Port Washington Harbor was constructed by the U.S. Federal Government in the early 1870s as a commercial port. Because Port Washington does not have a natural harbor, the government must dredge the harbor every few decades to prevent the twelve-foot-deep channels from filling with sediment. The Port Washington Generating Station on the southern shore received daily shipments of coal through the harbor until 2004, when it became a natural gas power plant. When the coal shipments stopped, the commercial port closed, but the community continues to operate a marina for recreational boaters from April 1 through November 1.

Port Washington has limited public transit compared with larger cities. Ozaukee County and the Milwaukee County Transit System run the Route 143 commuter bus, also known as the "Ozaukee County Express," to Milwaukee via Interstate 43. The closest stop is the route's northern terminus at the Saukville Walmart parking lot, near Interstate 43 Exit 96. The bus operates Monday through Friday with limited hours corresponding to peak commute times. Ozaukee County Transit Services' Shared Ride Taxi is the public transit option for traveling to sites not directly accessible from the interstate. The taxis operate seven days a week and make connections to Washington County Transit and Milwaukee County Routes 12, 49 and 42u. Unlike a typical taxi, however, the rider must contact the service ahead of time to schedule their pick-up date and time. The taxi service plans their routes based on the number of riders, pick-up/drop-off time and destination then plans the routes accordingly.

The City of Port Washington has sidewalks in most areas for pedestrian traffic. Additionally, the Ozaukee Interurban Trail for pedestrian and bicycle use runs north-south through the city and connects Port Washington to the neighboring communities of Grafton in the south and Belgium in the north. The trail continues north to Oostburg in Sheboygan County and south to Brown Deer where it connects with the Oak Leaf Trail. The trail was formerly an interurban passenger rail line that ran from Milwaukee to Sheboygan with a stop in Port Washington, which was the halfway point between the northern and southern terminuses. The train was in operation from 1907 to 1948, when it fell into disuse following World War II. The old rail line was converted into the present recreational trail in the 1990s.

The city does not have passenger rail service, but the Union Pacific Railroad operates freight trains in the community.

== Parks and recreation ==
The City of Port Washington maintains twenty-nine public parks with amenities including picnic shelters, baseball and softball fields, tennis courts, nature preserves, and a public pool. The parks and recreation department offers recreation programs for residents and facilitates men's basketball and softball leagues as well as women's volleyball and fastpitch leagues. The City also has Possibility Playground, an accessible playground designed to be used by children with special needs.

The Port Washington marina is open for recreational boaters from April through November. Fishers can also use the breakwaters to catch lake trout and Chinook salmon. Each summer the Port Washington Yacht Club hosts a double-handed (two-person crew) sailboat race in late June and the across-the-lake "Clipper Club" sailboat race on the second Friday in August. The Great Lakes Sport Fishermen—Ozaukee Chapter hosts the Great Lakes Sport Fishing Derby in Port Washington from July 1 through July 3, and the local chapter of the Lions Club hosts a fishing contest on the last weekend in July.

The Ozaukee Interurban Trail runs through the City of Port Washington, following the former route of the Milwaukee Interurban Rail Line. The southern end of the trail is at Bradley Road in Brown Deer which connects to the Oak Leaf Trail (43°09′48″N 87°57′39″W), and its northern end is at DeMaster Road in the Village of Oostburg Sheboygan County (43°36′57″N 87°48′08″W). The trail connects the community to neighboring Grafton and Belgium.

The Wisconsin Shipwreck Coast National Marine Sanctuary, established in 2021 and the site of a large number of historically significant shipwrecks, lies in the waters of Lake Michigan off Port Washington.

== In popular culture ==
The television sitcom Step by Step was set in a fictionalized version of Port Washington. The show was filmed at Warner Bros. Studios in Burbank, California, and the establishing shots of the main characters' home were actually of a house in South Pasadena, California, not Port Washington.

== Notable people ==
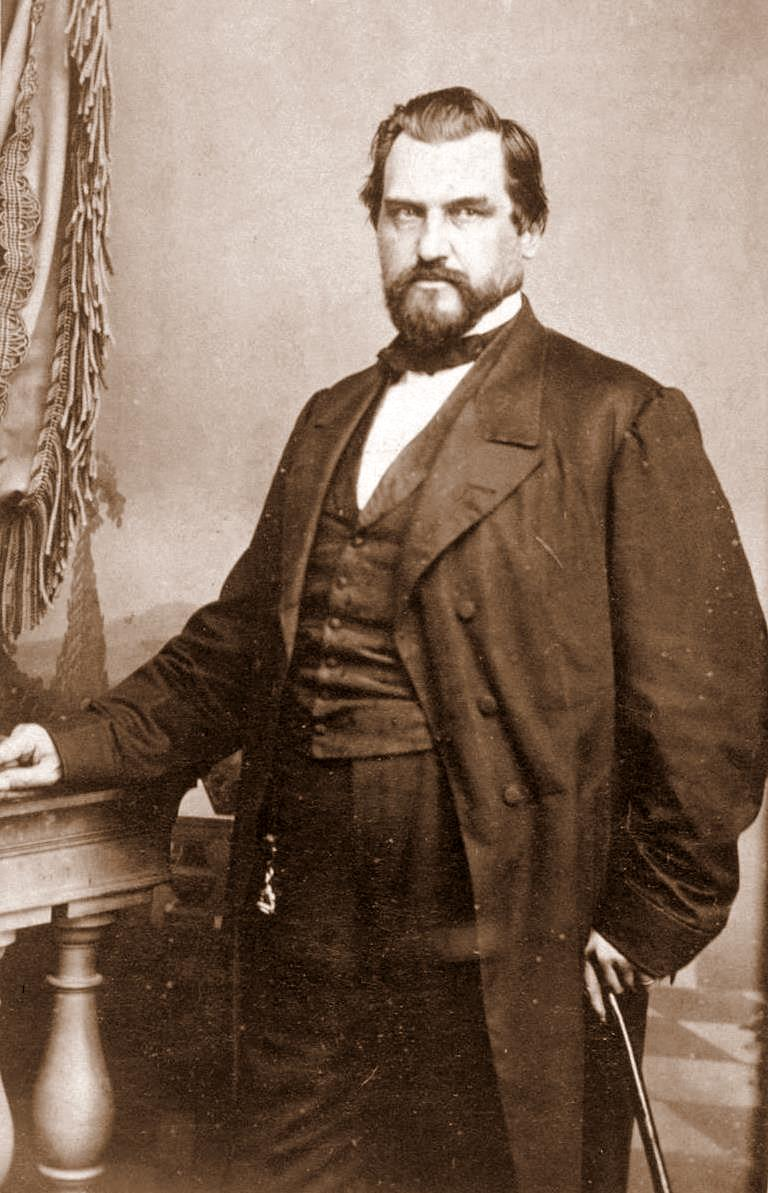
Leland Stanford (1824–1893) had a law practice in Port Washington in the early 1850s before moving to California, where he built a business empire and was involved in the construction of First transcontinental railroad. He later served as a United States Senator and Governor of California, and used his considerable fortune to create Stanford University.

- A. Manette Ansay, writer
- Vernon Biever, photographer
- Edward Reed Blake, politician
- John R. Bohan, politician
- Harry W. Bolens, politician
- Alice Duff Clausing, politician
- John DeMerit, Major League Baseball player
- Peter V. Deuster, U.S. diplomat and politician
- Dustin Diamond, actor
- Alex Dieringer, folkstyle and freestyle wrestler
- Marc C. Duff, politician
- Josh Gasser, professional basketball player
- Janine P. Geske, jurist
- Warren A. Grady, politician
- Henry Hase, politician
- Adolph F. Heidkamp, politician
- William E. Hoehle, politician
- Beany Jacobson, Major League Baseball player
- Mitch Jacoby, National Football League player
- David W. Opitz, politician
- M. Rickert, writer
- Mike Seifert, National Football League player
- Leland Stanford, United States Senator, 8th Governor of California, and founder of Stanford University
- Donald K. Stitt, Chairman of the Republican Party of Wisconsin
- Rich Strenger, National Football League player
- Eugene S. Turner, legislator
- Samuel A. White, politician
- Al Wickland, Major League Baseball player
- Albert J. Wilke, politician

== Sister city ==
Port Washington's sister city is Sassnitz, Mecklenburg-Vorpommern, Germany (since 2017).
