= William E. Hoehle =

American politician

William E. Hoehle was a member of the Wisconsin State Assembly.

== Biography ==
Hoehle was born on March 17, 1866, in Kings County, New York. In 1869, he moved to Port Washington, Wisconsin. After residing in Green Bay, Wisconsin, Oshkosh, Wisconsin, Appleton, Wisconsin, and Sheboygan, Wisconsin, Hoehle became a lawyer in 1887 and settled in West Superior, Wisconsin.

== Political career ==
Hoehle was a member of the Assembly during the 1899 session. Previously, he was President of the West Superior Board of Education in 1893 and City Attorney of West Superior in 1895. He was a Republican.
