= Little Charity Island =

Island in Michigan, United States

- Location within Michigan

Geography
- Location: Saginaw Bay
- Coordinates: 44°00′09″N 83°27′58″W
- Area: 5.4 acres (2.2 ha)

Administration
- United States
- State: Michigan
- County: Arenac County
- Township: Sims Township

Demographics
- Population: Uninhabited

Little Charity Island is a small island in Saginaw Bay, Lake Huron. The 5.4-acre (0.02 km^{2}) island is located in Sims Township, Arenac County in the U.S. state of Michigan. Acquired by the U.S. Fish and Wildlife Service in 1999, it is administered by staff from the Seney National Wildlife Refuge as a unit of the Michigan Islands National Wildlife Refuge.

Little Charity Island is located in the middle of the bay, inland from its larger neighbor, Big Charity Island. It rises approximately halfway between "Point Lookout" to the northwest and "Sand Point" to the southeast. The island is home to some riparian tree life, and is home to colony-nesting waterbirds, including double-crested cormorants. Many bay fishermen use the island as a navigation point.

Little Charity Island was once called Ile de Traverse, according to an 1839 map of Michigan. In the 19th century and early 20th century Little Charity was owned by Bay Port Fish Company, a commercial fishing company in Saginaw Bay, for its riparian water rights. After the 1940s, when Michigan law changed, the island was sold as were other islands in the bay.
