= St. Mary's Roman Catholic Church (Port Washington, Wisconsin) =

Historic church in Wisconsin, United States

- U.S. National Register of Historic Places
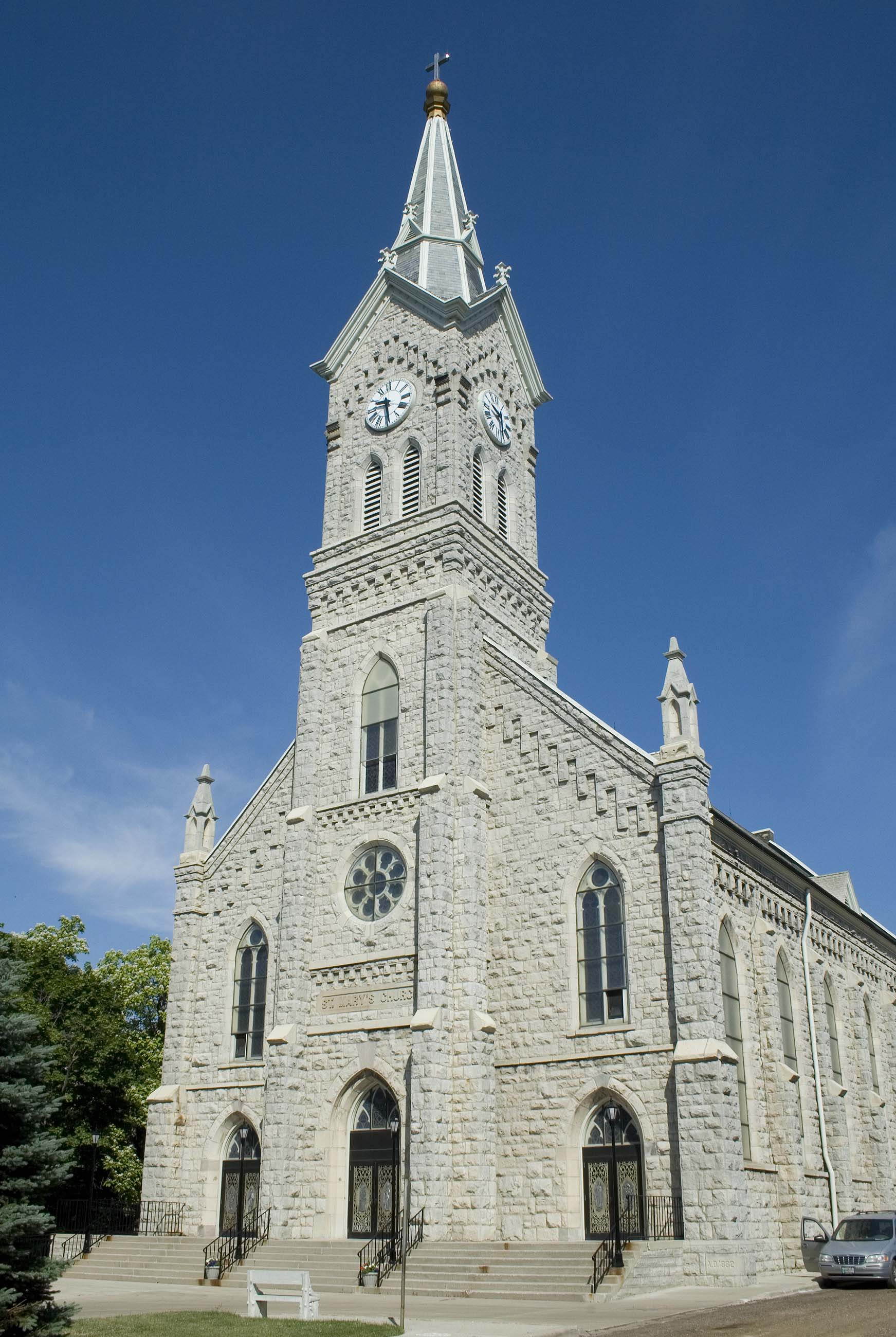
- St. Mary's Roman Catholic Church

- Location within Wisconsin
- Location: 430 N. Johnson St. Port Washington, Wisconsin
- Coordinates: 43.39196°N 87.86956°W
- Built: 1882
- Architect: Henry Messmer
- Architectural style: Gothic Revival
- NRHP reference No.: 77000042
- Added to NRHP: December 12, 1977 Height-189 ft

St. Mary's Roman Catholic Church is a Roman Catholic church located in Port Washington, Wisconsin. Its congregation is part of the parish of St. John XXIII in the Archdiocese of Milwaukee. The church was added to the National Register of Historic Places in 1977 for its architectural and religious significance.

== History ==
The first Catholic Mass in Port Washington was read in Franz Gengler's home in 1847. In 1849 the growing parish built a tiny wooden church on "Lighthouse Hill." Since then the hill has also been called "Church Hill." In 1860 they built a larger stone church. By 1881 the parish had grown to 250 families, and they built the current church.

In 2016, St. Mary's officially merged with St. Peter of Alcantara in Port Washington and Immaculate Conception in Saukville to become St. John XXIII Parish. The traditional name of the site remains, and is now referred to as St. John XXIII Parish: St. Mary's Site.

== Architecture ==
Henry Messmer of Milwaukee designed the new church building in Gothic Revival style, with walls of random ashlar limestone quarried three miles north of the building. A large tower is in the front center, with the main entrance at its base and a rose window above it. The square tower rises to an octagonal spire topped with various crosses. The building is decorated with wall buttresses, corbels, and corner parapets. Some parts of the exterior are trimmed in light-colored marble.

The inside is decorated with tall double lancet stained glass windows. An ornate high altar was built by E. Hackner and Son of La Crosse in 1912. The apse behind it is decorated with pastels and gold leaf.

In 1883 at the new church's dedication, a speaker described the building as "a splendid structure, an ornament not only to the city, but the entire state." Today the building, on its prominent hill, is still a focal point of the downtown.
