= Wisconsin Chair Company =

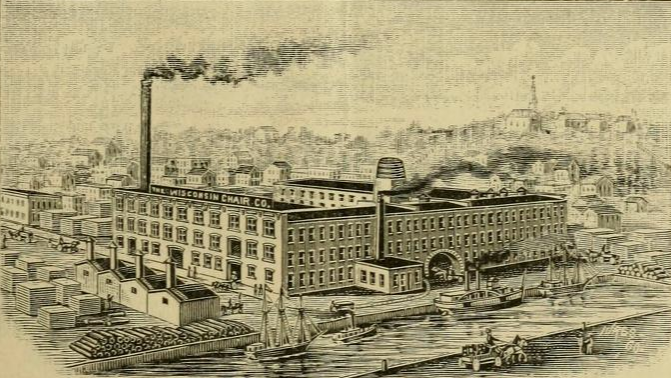
- Main Factory
- Type: Private company
- Industry: General manufacturing
- Predecessor: 1886 as chair company in Sheboygan, Wisconsin (name unknown)
- Founded: 1888 in Port Washington, Wisconsin
- Founders: Fred A. Dennett
- Defunct: 1954
- Fate: Defunct
- Headquarters: Port Washington, Wisconsin, United States
- Key people: John Bostwick (as vice president in 1899 and president in 1920); George B. Mattoon (as co-founder of predecessor)
- Products: Furniture & Records
- Number of employees: 800 (1899)

The Wisconsin Chair Company was a manufacturer of furniture and crafted wood products from the late 19th to the mid-20th century. It ran a large factory that for over half a century was the economic backbone of Port Washington, Wisconsin. The factory was destroyed twice: the first time by a huge, devastating fire in 1899 and the second time by demolition in 1959.

== Formation ==
In 1886, Frederick A. Dennett and his partner George B. Mattoon originally founded a chair manufacturing company in Sheboygan, WI. A fire destroyed the factory in 1887, which ended Dennett's partnership with Mattoon. Dennett reorganized the company and moved it to Port Washington, and it was established as The Wisconsin Chair Company on October 15, 1888. Unfortunately, the factory was destroyed once again in 1899. However, Dennett was able to rebuild with the help of investor, John M. Bostwick, a local jeweler and son-in-law of Barnum Blake. Bostwick became the company's vice president until Dennett's death in 1920, after which he became the president.

The first plant built by the Wisconsin Chair Co. became the largest employer in the area, providing work for one-sixth of the Ozaukee County work force. Its presence was most likely the chief reason that the city's Port Washington population increased from 1,659 in 1890 to more than 3,000 by 1900.

== 1899 fire ==
Surviving its first financially difficult years, the Chair company suffered its worst blow in 1899 when it was totally leveled by fire. The fire engulfed much of downtown Port Washington and engines from Sheboygan and Milwaukee were called in to help contain the blaze. The glow from the fire could be seen as far away as Whitefish Bay.

The company showed its resiliency by immediately rebuilding, and for many years remained the backbone of Port Washington's economy. The incredible success story eventually ended as sales and profits became smaller and production slowed down.

== 20th century ==
Phonographs and Records

In 1915, the Wisconsin Chair Company began producing cabinets for Edison's diamond disc phonograph. Shortly after, they incorporated the United Phonographs Corporation (UPC) as a subsidiary to produce phonograph cabinets for other companies, as well as their own.

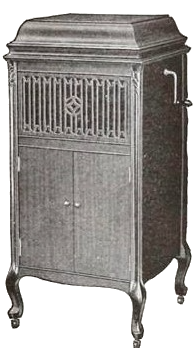
Model 30 Paramount

The UPC produced several different brands, including United, Paramount, Puritan, Vista, and Colonial. They also controlled the New York Recording Laboratories as a subsidiary to produce Paramount Records and Puritan Records, to help boost phonograph sales. Additionally, the company made unbranded phonographs to be sold to local businesses: department stores, music shops, or any business wanting to sell their own house brand, for which they could apply their own tag or decal.

The phonograph slump of 1922-1924, caused by an oversaturated market and the rise of early radio, led the UPC to abandon most phonograph production. Only the Paramount brand survived into the Orthophonic era, with the label continuing into the early 1930s. While production of Puritan phonographs ceased between 1922-1923, the Puritan record label lasted until the late 1920s. The Great Depression ultimately ended all phonograph and record production for the Wisconsin Chair Company.

Post-Depression

After Bostwick's death in 1935, Wisconsin Chair was run by Otto Moeser, a company trustee. The company almost failed during the Depression, surviving in part by limiting mass production and instead producing craft pieces for the luxury market.

The company had a number of specialized divisions. One, the National School Equipment Co., manufactured school chairs and desks, usually under government contracts.

The plant was a union shop under the United Brotherhood of Carpenters and Joiners.

== Closure ==
By 1954, the company had closed its sprawling but inefficient 1900 plant, which, like the 1889 plant, was located behind and east of the N. Franklin Street business district, partially encircling the city's inner harbor. It has now been demolished.

There is a historic plaque in the area where the plant once stood detailing the 1899 fire.
