= Adolph F. Heidkamp =

American politician

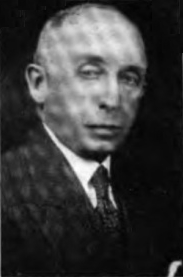
Michigan State Senator Adolph F. Heidkamp

Adolph F. Heidkamp was a member of the Michigan Senate.

== Biography ==
Heidkamp was born in Port Washington, Wisconsin. He would become a banker.

Heidkamp was the son of Adolph N. Heidkamp, a newspaper publisher and Probate Judge in Ozaukee County who immigrated from Odenthal Germany in 1852; and Anne-Marie Hansen from Redange, Everlange in the Grand Duchy of Luxembourg. His Mother was previously married to Francois (Franz) Gengler, with whom she had three children: John, Marguerite and Elizabeth. She married Senator Heidkamp's father in 1854 and bore him four children who survived into adulthood: Louise (married to Nicholas Watry), Anna Elizabeth (married to William Diederich), Adolph F. and Emil Michael (married to Rose Isabel Young). Senator Heidkamp remained a bachelor his entire life.

Senator Heidkamp served as President of the village of Lake Linden in northern Michigan for 24 years before serving in the Michigan Senate. He was also Secretary-Treasurer of Bosch Brewery in Houghton prior to serving in the Michigan State Senate

During his term as President Pro Temp of the Michigan State Senate, Heidkamp authored the motion that allowed the Michigan Assembly to hold a special convention on April 10, 1934, so it would become the first state to ratify the 21st Amendment (which nullified the 18th Amendment and Prohibition).

== Political career ==
Heidkamp was a member of the Senate from 1929 to 1936. Previously, he was an unsuccessful candidate for the Senate in 1924 and 1926 and was one again in 1938 and 1940. He was a Republican.
