= Vernon Biever =

American photographer

- Born: Vernon Joseph Biever; May 21, 1923 Port Washington, Wisconsin, US
- Died: October 13, 2010 (aged 87) Port Washington, Wisconsin, US
- Occupation: Sports Photographer
- Notable awards: Green Bay Packers Hall of Fame (2002); NFL Photographer of the Year (1984)

Vernon Joseph Biever (May 21, 1923 – October 13, 2010) was an American photographer, most notably with the Green Bay Packers.

Biever covered his first Packers game in 1941 for The Milwaukee Sentinel while a student at St. Norbert College. He served in the United States Army during World War II. Later, he owned a Ben Franklin store and a travel agency in Port Washington, Wisconsin. He was the official team photographer from 1946 until his retirement in 2006. He was inducted into the Green Bay Packers Hall of Fame in 2002.

His photographs were collected in The Glory of Titletown (ISBN 0878339906). Biever's photographs have been featured in books, television shows, and movies.

Biever's son John is a photographer for Sports Illustrated. His other son, James, and grandson, Michael, also were photographers for the Packers.
