= Possibility Playground =

Playground in Port Washington, Wisconsin, United States

Coordinates: 43.39501°N 87.86537°W

Possibility Playground is a playground in Port Washington, Ozaukee County, Wisconsin built to accommodate children with special needs and used by children of all abilities. The playground was the brainchild of Mardy McGarry, a special education teacher at Lincoln Elementary School.

With donations from several local organizations and many individuals, McGarry was able to raise enough money for the building materials. The actual construction was done by thousands of volunteers, beginning in September 2008 and completed within six days. Opened in October 2008, the playground has equipment that accommodates the disabilities of special needs children so that they can navigate the playground with ease.

== Planning ==
The idea of Possibility Playground, a playground where "all kids can play", was contrived by Mardy McGarry, a special education teacher at Lincoln Elementary School, an elementary school in Port Washington, Wisconsin. The design of many playgrounds prevented her students from playing on them. McGarry saw how the sand and woodchips hindered the movement of wheelchairs. The playground was christened "Possibility Playground" because it is a playground for all children, for those who have special needs and those who do not. McGarry contacted design companies and sought advice from therapists who work with special needs children. The Port Washington City Council allocated a piece of land for the project, with the condition that McGarry build the playground.

== Donations and building ==
The building materials for Possibility Playground had a cost of $450,000. However, construction costs would have placed a further $900,000 price tag on the project.

McGarry's local Kiwanis Club donated $7,000 to the project. Then, a woman contributed $25,000 and her company matched the gift. Money was raised through a number of fundraisers, such as "Run, Walk and Roll", which raised $15,000. Other events include a Guitar Hero contest and a silent auction.

On September 16, 2008, volunteers began constructing the playground. Volunteers worked for four-hour shifts. The workers consisted of 30 members of the United States Navy from Milwaukee, children from Mukwonago and college students from the Milwaukee School of Engineering, as well as church groups. Save for three "build captains" from Leathers & Associates, the design firm, none of the workers were paid.

The playground was completed on September 21, 2008, after six days of volunteer work by thousands of local citizens. Possibility Playground was officially opened on October 11, 2008.

== Playground equipment and structure ==
Possibility Playground has a "poured-rubber surface", while the equipment is formed from structural plastic. This allows children in wheelchairs to navigate around the playground more easily. The playground is surrounded by a picket fence to prevent children from straying off.

The playground has a pirate ship that is adorned with a Lake Michigan design. It is also outfitted with a lighthouse, monkey bars, swings, a sandbox, balance beams, as well as tunnels and a police car. Some of the swings are specially fashioned to give more support to children who have little muscle strength.

Possibility Playground is about the size of a football field.
