= Saginaw Bay =

Bay in Lake Huron, Michigan, U.S.

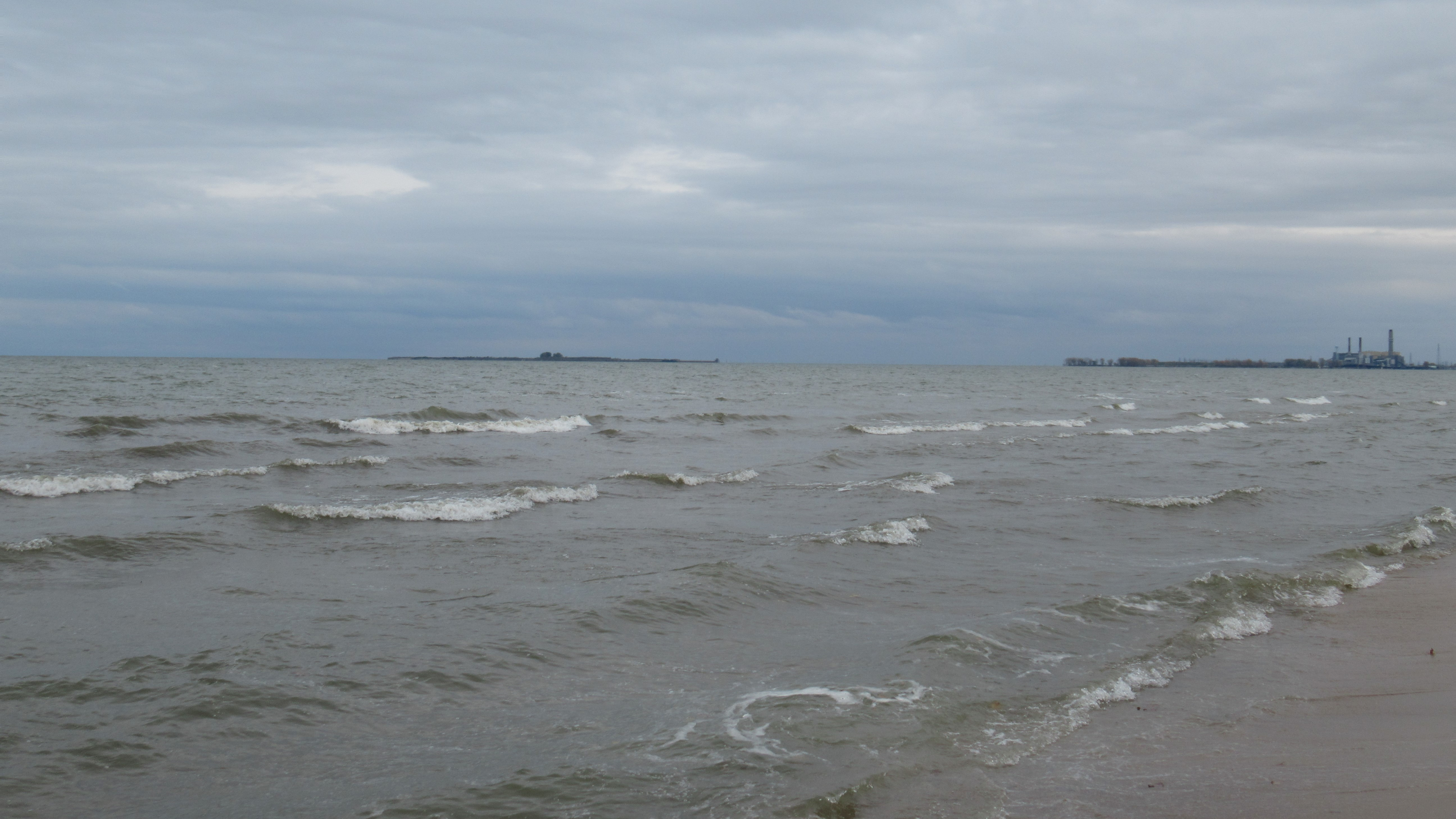
- View from Bay City State Park

- Location within the state of Michigan Location within the United States
- Location: Lake Huron; Lower Peninsula of Michigan
- Coordinates: 43°55′N 83°35′W
- Type: Bay
- Basin countries: United States
- Surface area: 1,143 square miles (2,960 km^{2})
- Surface elevation: 581 feet (177 m)

Saginaw Bay is a bay within Lake Huron located on the eastern side of the U.S. state of Michigan. It forms the space between Michigan's Thumb region and the rest of the Lower Peninsula of Michigan. Saginaw Bay is 1,143 square miles (2,960 km^{2}) in area. It is located in parts of five Michigan counties: Arenac, Bay, Huron, Iosco, and Tuscola.

== Watershed ==
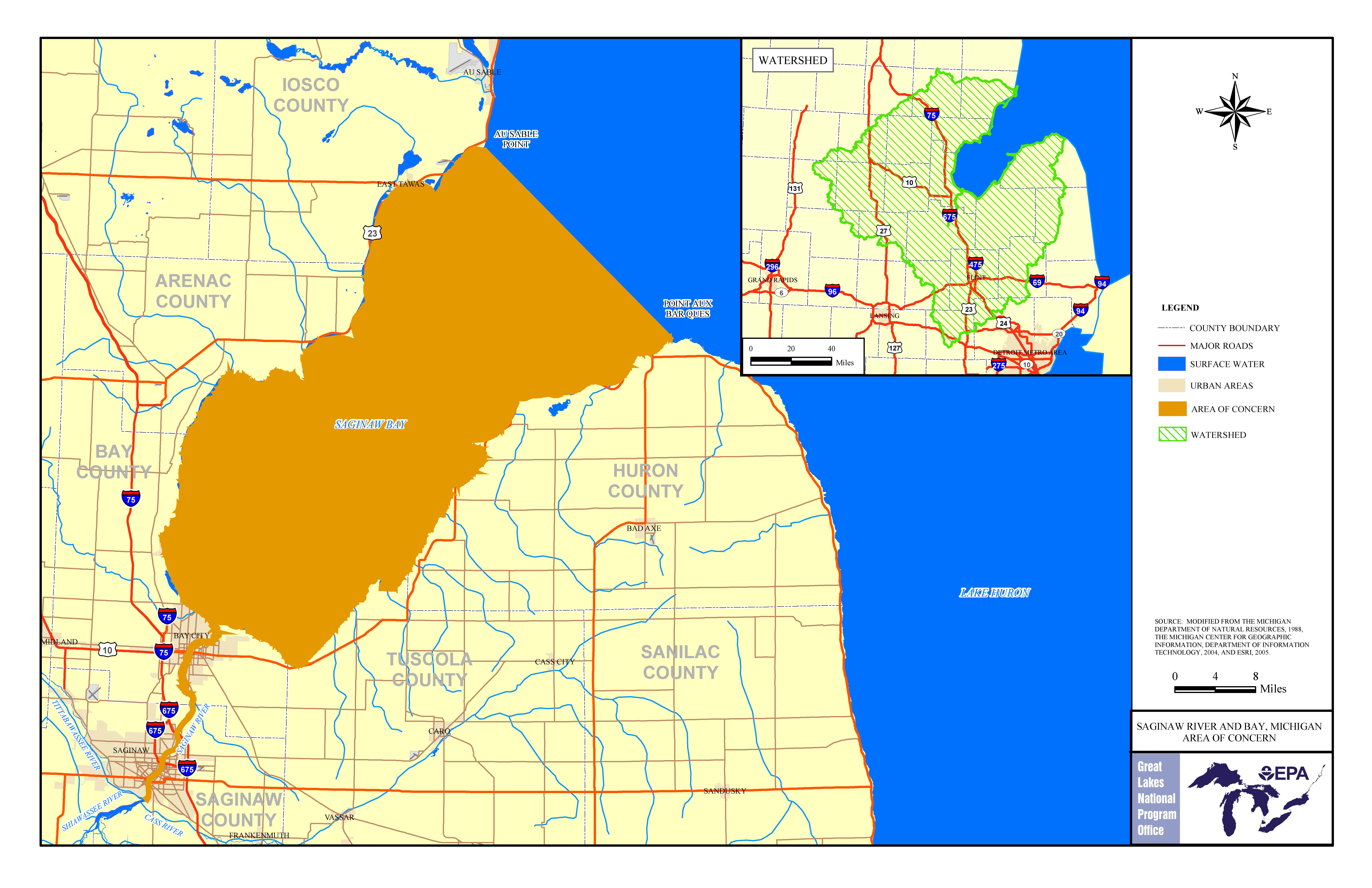
Location of Saginaw Bay watershed

The Saginaw Bay watershed is the largest drainage basin in Michigan, draining approximately 15% of the total land area. The watershed contains the largest contiguous freshwater coastal wetland system in the United States. The Saginaw Bay Watershed Initiative Network leads the effort to promote sustainable development in the Saginaw Bay Watershed by coordinating watershed programs and providing grants to innovative projects across the region. It is currently listed as an Area of Concern by the Environmental Protection Agency.

== Etymology ==
Possible origins for the name "Saginaw" could be from the Ojibwe words O-Sag-e-non (Ozaagiinaang) or Sag-in-a-we (Zaagiinaang), meaning "to flow out". It may refer to the Saginaw River, which flows out into Saginaw Bay and eventually into Lake Huron.

== History ==
Saginaw Bay Informational Designation
- Interactive map of Saginaw Bay Informational Designation

Michigan State Historic Site
- Designated: October 30, 1956

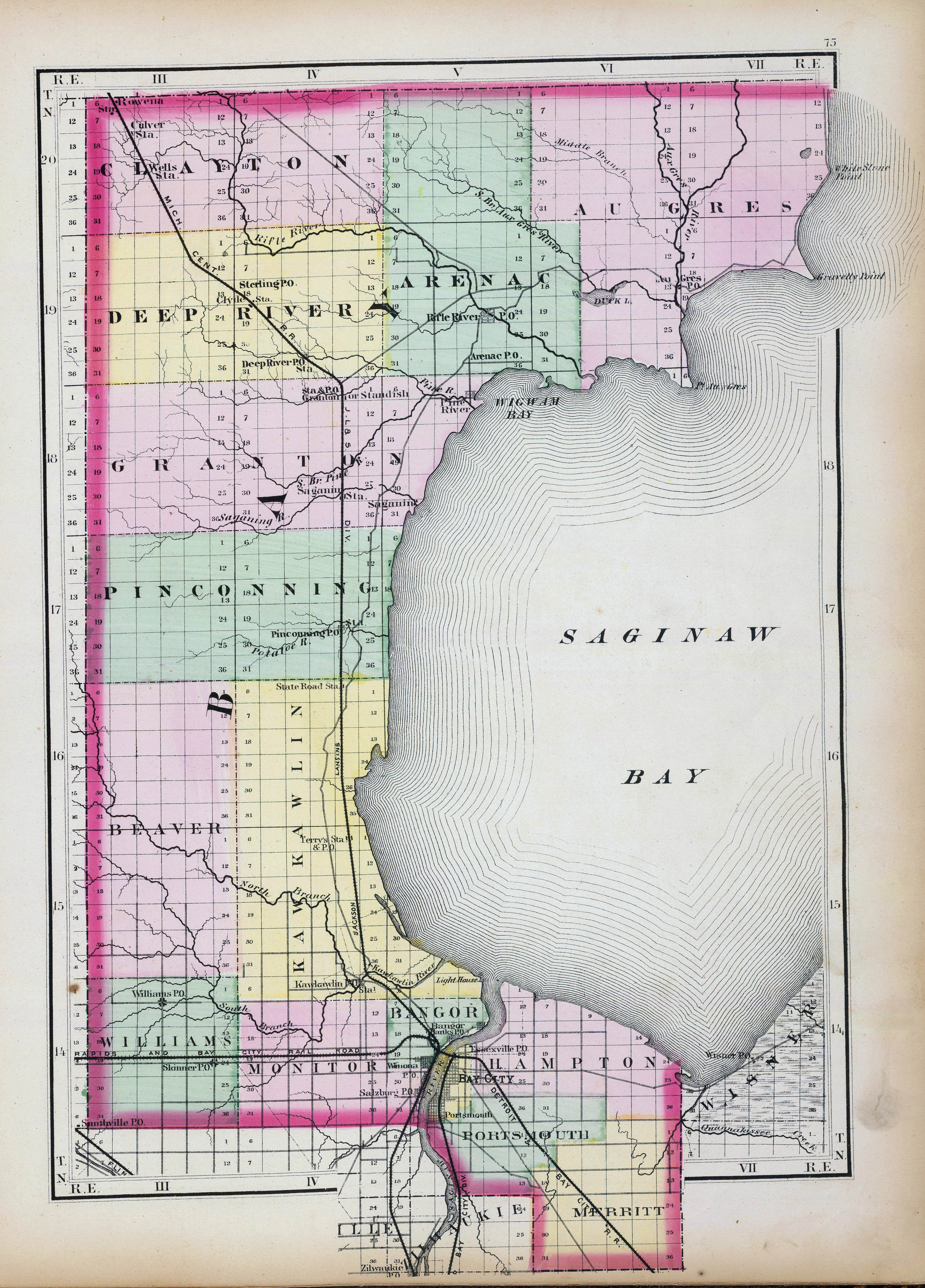
1873 map of Saginaw Bay and Bay County, Michigan

This area was long settled by indigenous peoples, lastly by bands of the Ojibwe people prior to European exploration. They dominated the areas around the Great Lakes. In the early 17th century, French explorers were the first Europeans to visit the Great Lakes region. The first to visit the Saginaw Bay area was Father Jacques Marquette, a French Jesuit missionary priest, who went there in 1668 after establishing a mission in St. Ignace. In 1686, Father Jean Enjalran arrived in the valley to establish an Indian mission, but his efforts failed.

France ceded its nominal control of the region to Great Britain under the terms of the Treaty of Paris of 1763 following Britain's victory in the Seven Years' War. Twenty years later, Britain ceded it to the newly independent United States. It became part of the Michigan Territory in 1805 and later was admitted to the Union as the State of Michigan.

During development of natural resources in the 19th century, Saginaw Bay was busy with shipping of lumber and other commodities to eastern markets.

== Settlements ==
About 1813, Louis Campau erected an Indian trading post along the Saginaw River, which led to the development of Saginaw City, Michigan, in 1816 (which was combined with East Saginaw City in March 1890 to form Saginaw, Michigan). The history of other settlements of the Saginaw Bay area was connected to this. Bay City, Michigan is a major port at the lower end of the bay. The two islands in the middle of the bay, Charity Island and Little Charity Island, are excellent fishing grounds.

== Fisheries ==
Because Saginaw Bay is shallower and warmer than the main basin of Lake Huron, its fish community is also different. Both recreational and commercial fisheries operate in Saginaw Bay. Walleye and yellow perch are the primary sport species while the commercial fishery primarily targets lake whitefish and yellow perch. The commercial fishery is a state of Michigan licensed fishery as opposed to tribal based fisheries that operate in other parts of Lake Huron. The recreational fishery became more prominent in the last half of the 20th century. Prior to that, the bay's fisheries were almost entirely commercial. Like much of the Great Lakes, the fisheries collapsed or became severely degraded around the middle part of the 20th century. This was attributed mainly to habitat degradation (dam construction, sedimentation of off shore spawning areas), pollution, cultural eutrophication, and the effects of invasive species. The relatively intense exploitation of the commercial fisheries that operated at the time probably hastened the declines but was not believed to be the main cause since they had operated there since the late 17th century.

Resurgence of the fisheries began after passage of clean water legislation like the Clean Water Act and the Great Lakes Clean Water Pact. The walleye fishery began a resurgence in the early 1980s when the Michigan Department of Natural Resources initiated a fingerling stocking program. The sport fishery soon remerged, but the commercial fishery for walleye which was formally closed in 1970, remained closed. The recreational fishery harvest averaged 80,000 walleyes annually from 1986 to 2002 but was hatchery dependent with as much as 80% of the harvest being hatchery fish. A profound food web shift in Lake Huron took place in 2003 with the near disappearance of the invasive alewife. Alewives used Saginaw Bay's near-shore waters as spawning and nursery grounds and were a formidable predator and competitor on newly hatched percid (walleye and yellow perch) fry. In the absence of alewives, walleye and yellow perch reproductive success greatly increased. The Michigan Department of Natural Resources discontinued stocking in 2006, and walleye recovery targets were formally met in 2009. Recreational harvest since then has ranged from about 150,000 per year to as much as 350,000 per year. The Michigan Department of Natural Resources liberalized walleye recreational harvest (higher daily possession limit and lower minimum length limit) in 2015. Although yellow perch also benefitted from the absence of alewives with greater reproductive success, the numbers of adults has declined and remained depressed. This is because of a high mortality rate in their first year of life, believed to be predation from walleye and other predators.

Other historically important species in Saginaw Bay include lake sturgeon and cisco (lake herring). Until the middle of the 20th century, Saginaw Bay supported an enormous cisco commercial fishery. They declined throughout much of the lake and have not recovered in Saginaw Bay. A cisco fingerling stocking program aimed at restoring a breeding population in the bay was initiated in 2017, a joint exercise by the U.S. Fish and Wildlife Service, the Michigan Department of Natural Resources and other partner agencies of the Great Lakes Fishery Commission. Lake sturgeon, which mainly spawn in rivers, are also the subject of a restocking effort led by the Michigan Department of Natural Resources, with plantings taking place in the Saginaw River system.

== Weather ==
Saginaw Bay Light No. 1, a navigational light 11 nautical miles northeast of the mouth of the Saginaw River, houses NOAA weather equipment providing weather conditions for the bay. Gravelly Shoal Light, located near Charity Island, also houses a weather station.

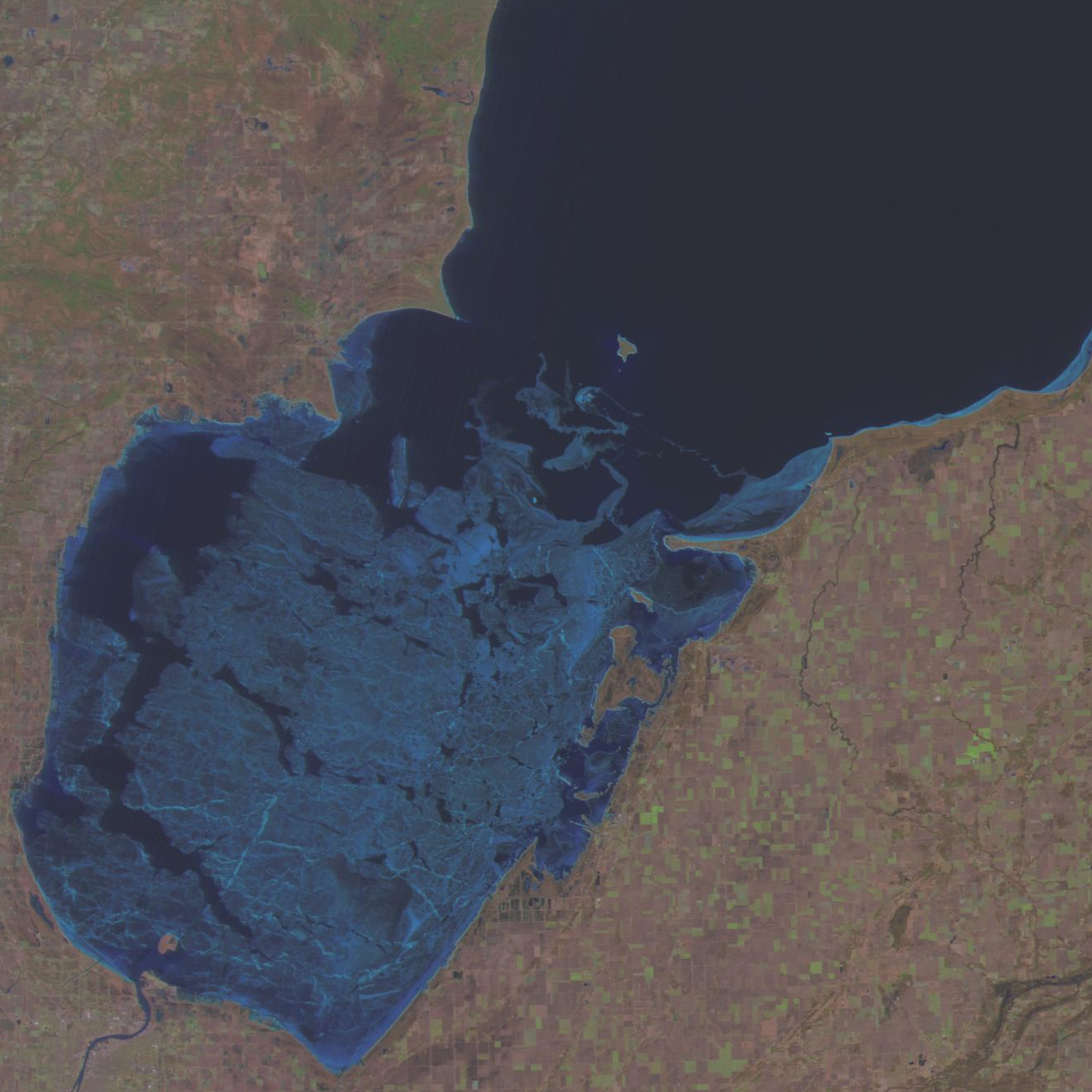
Taken with Resourcesat-2 on March 20, 2022

== See also ==
- USS Saginaw Bay
- Saginaw Bay Yacht Club
