= Lake George (Hammond, Indiana) =

Lake in Hammond, Indiana

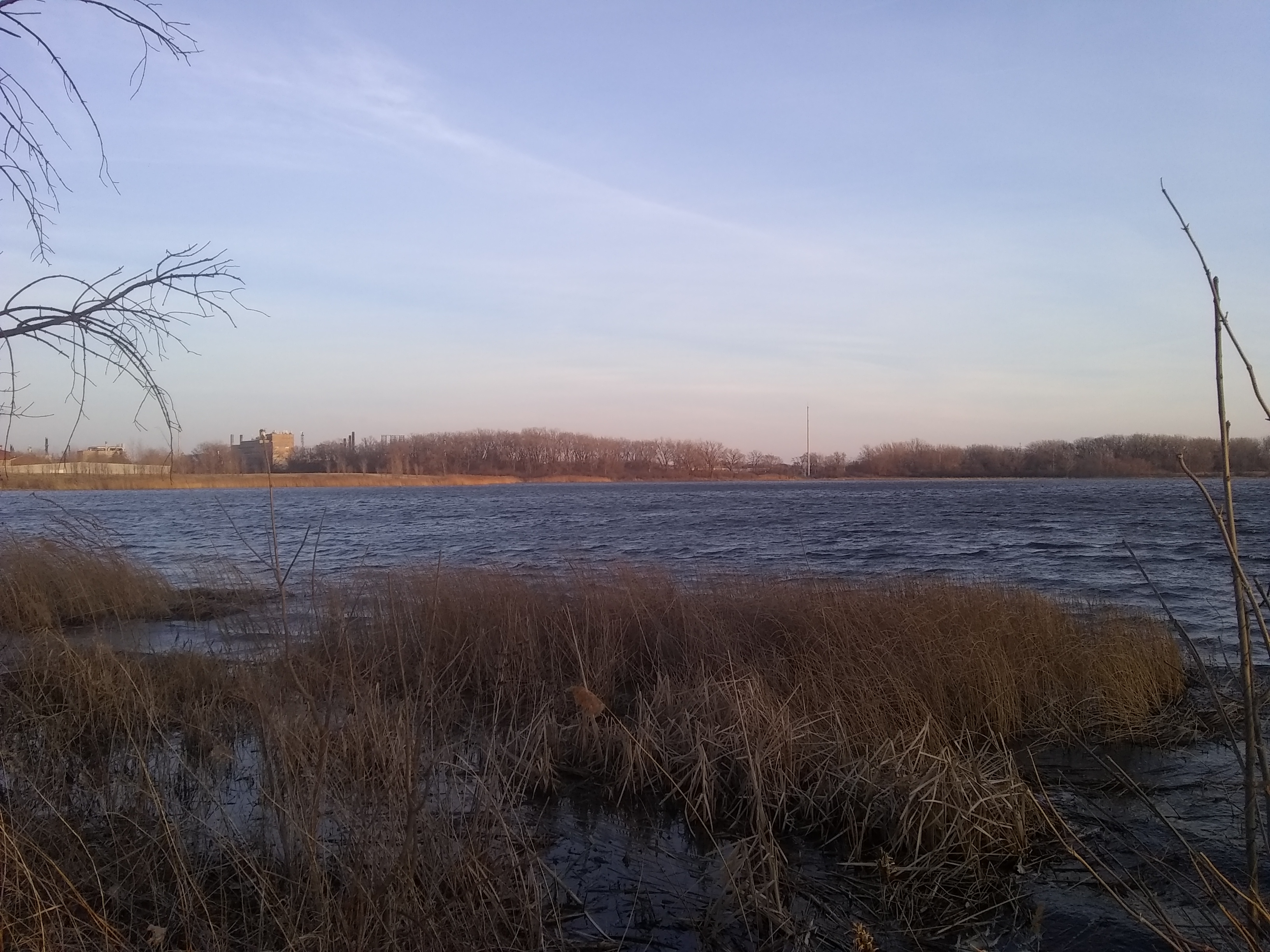
- View of Lake George from the George Lake Trail in Hammond

- Location within Indiana Location within the United States
- Location: Hammond, Lake County, Indiana
- Coordinates: 41°40′10″N 87°30′10″W
- Basin countries: United States
- Managing agency: Hammond Port Authority
- Surface area: 148 acres (60 ha)
- Average depth: 1.8 ft (0.55 m) (north basin); 2.2 ft (0.67 m) (south basin)
- Max. depth: 4 ft (1.2 m) (north basin); 3.5 ft (1.1 m) (south basin)
- Surface elevation: 584 ft (178 m)

Lake George is a lake in Hammond, Indiana, in the United States.

Lake George is in the far northwest corner of Indiana, part of the Chicago metropolitan area. It sits between Wolf Lake to the west and Lake Michigan to the east. Lake George has a north and south basin divided by the Lake George Trail, a 3.1-mile (5.0 km) greenway. Calumet College of St. Joseph sits on the eastern shore of the lake.

Before development of the greater region, the area around Lake George was covered with wetlands, slow-moving rivers, and shallow lakes. In the 1900s, some of these areas were filled in with slag wastes from steel production and materials dredged from the Calumet River system. As a result, the lake has lost about half of its surface area and has become extremely shallow with a maximum depth of about 4 ft (1.2 m).

Studies in the 1990s demonstrated that phragmites and other non-native invasive plants had choked out native species in the lake. The Indiana Department of Natural Resources began a project in the 2010s to counteract the invasion of invasive plants and restore the larger Grand Calumet River area as a nesting and foraging habitat for birds. The restoration involves a combination of herbicide applications to kill the invasive species followed by re-seeding with native plants.

In addition, working through the Hammond port Authority, the city has added beaches, hiking and biking trails, improved fishing and boating facilities, and other entertainment venues, in an attempt to make Hammond a tourist destination.
