= Port Washington Breakwater Light =

Lighthouse on Lake Michigan in Port Washington, Wisconsin, United States

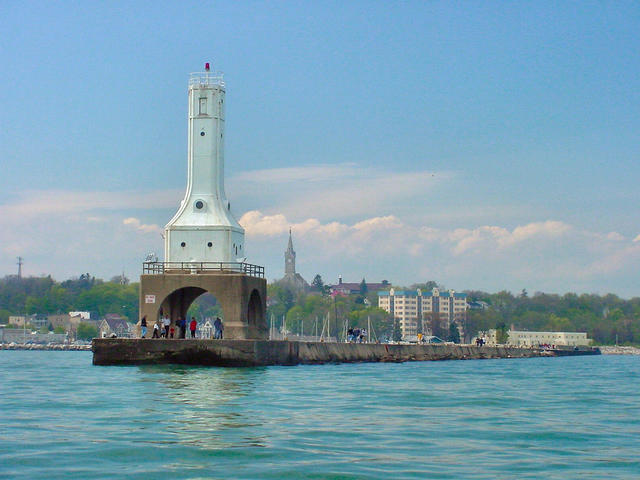
- contemporary photograph of light
- Location: End of north breakwater at entrance to Port Washington, Wisconsin harbor
- Coordinates: 43.3853°N 87.8597°W

Tower
- Constructed: 1889
- Foundation: Concrete
- Construction: Wood (first) steel (second)
- Automated: 1975
- Height: 18 m (59 ft)
- Shape: square pyramidal tower (first); Art Deco tower on square base (second)
- Heritage: National Register of Historic Places listed place

Light
- First lit: 1889 (first tower); 1935 (second tower)
- Focal height: 78 feet (24 m)
- Range: 8 nmi (15 km; 9.2 mi)
- Characteristic: Fl R 6s

The Port Washington Breakwater Light is a lighthouse built in 1935 at the entrance to the Port Washington, Wisconsin harbor on Lake Michigan. The second tower at this location, it remains an active aid to navigation. It was listed on the National Register of Historic Places in 2018.

== History ==
With the dredging of the harbor in the 1870s and the extension of the piers bracketing it, the need was felt for a light to guide ships into the harbor entrance, as the existing lighthouse high above the water did no more than indicate the location of the town. Accordingly, a short wooden tower was constructed at the end of the north pier, equipped with a fourth-order Fresnel lens. This light supplanted the older lighthouse in 1903, but the keepers of the newer light continued to live in the latter, as no dwelling was provided on the pier. The beacon itself was automated in 1924 but the fog signal continued in manual operation.

In 1930 the Milwaukee Electric Railway & Light Company decided to build a $30 million steam-electric power plant south of the old shipping channel. That plant required a larger harbor to land ships carrying coal. In 1931 funds were provided to improve the harbor under the Works Progress Administration; Construction was protracted and the new breakwaters took three years to complete. As an addendum to this project a new light was constructed, identical to that built at the same time at the Indiana Harbor East Breakwater Light and a design at several other sites in the Great Lakes. This light, constructed of steel plates in an Art Deco style, stood on an open concrete platform which in turn perched at the end of the breakwater forming the northern limit of the harbor. The fourth order lens was retained. As with its predecessor, no provision was made to house the fog signal's keepers, and they continued to live in the old keeper's dwelling in town. Funds for the light were appropriated in 1934 and first light came the following year.

Full automation came late to this light. The old lens and its lantern were removed at an undetermined date, but keepers continued to operate the fog signal manually until 1975. The light continues in use, with a second but much shorter tower standing on the southern breakwater to mark the other side of the entrance.
