= Saukville (town), Wisconsin =

Town in Ozaukee County, Wisconsin

Town of Saukville, Wisconsin
- Town
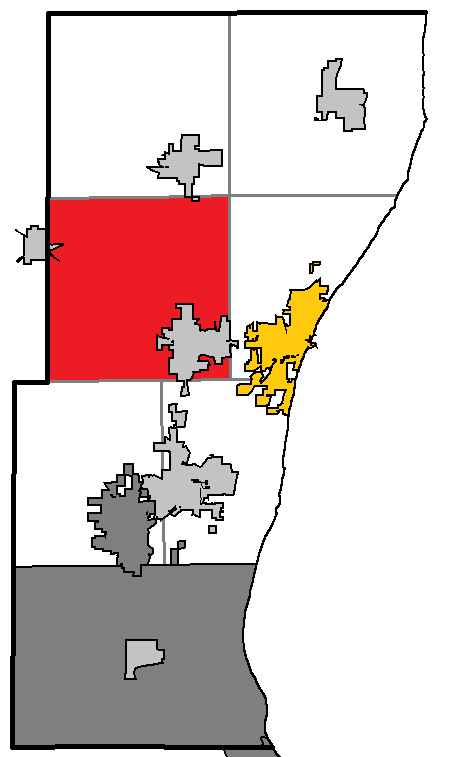
- Location of the Town of Saukville, within Ozaukee County, Wisconsin.
- Coordinates: 43°19′07″N 87°59′03″W
- Country: United States
- State: Wisconsin
- County: Ozaukee
- Settled: c. 1845
- Incorporated: 1848; 178 years ago

Government
  - Town Chairperson: Kevin Kimmes
  - Clerk: Raquel Engelke
  - Treasurer: Gloria Arredondo
  - Board of supervisors: Supervisors: Michael Denzien; Curt Rutkowski

Area
  - Total: 33.4 sq mi (86.4 km^{2})
  - Land: 32.7 sq mi (84.6 km^{2})
  - Water: 0.69 sq mi (1.8 km^{2})
- Elevation: 778 ft (237 m)

Population (2020)
  - Total: 1,765
  - Density: 54.0/sq mi (20.9/km^{2})
- Time zone: UTC-6 (Central (CST))
  - Summer (DST): UTC-5 (CDT)
- Area code: 262
- Website: townsaukville.org

Saukville is a town in Ozaukee County, Wisconsin, United States. The Village of Saukville is located in the town's southeastern quadrant. The population was 1,765 at the 2020 census.

Menominee and Sauk Native Americans lived in the area until the 1830s when the U.S. Federal Government forced them to leave Wisconsin. The first white settlers in the mid-1840s, and the Town of Saukville was organized in 1848. The early settlers were farmers, and dairy farming became the primary economic activity by the early 1900s. The Village of Saukville incorporated from some of the town's land in 1915, and while the village has become increasingly industrial, agriculture still plays a major role in the Town of Saukville's economy.

The town has thousands of acres of undeveloped, biodiverse bogs, coniferous swamps, and primeval beech-maple forests. The largest of the community's natural areas is the 2,200-acre Cedarburg Bog State Natural Area. The town's bogs are a habitat for many endangered species, birds, and carnivorous plants. Among other landforms, the Cedarburg Bog contains a string bog—a geographic feature that seldom occurs as far south as Wisconsin—which contains many plant species rarely seen outside remote parts of Canada.

== History ==
Saukville was the site of a Native American village at the crossroads of two trails, one of which became the north-south Green Bay Road and the other the east-west Dekora Road. Also located on the banks of the Milwaukee River, the village's inhabitants were probably Menominee and Sauk people. The Native Americans were forced to leave Wisconsin in the 1830s, and white settlers arrived in the area around 1845 and began to build along Green Bay Road.

Saukville was part of the town of Port Washington until 1848 when the Town of Saukville was established. Throughout the 19th and early 20th centuries, Saukville was a rural community with many dairy farmers. In 1871, a rail line was constructed through Saukville. It would eventually become part of the Chicago, Milwaukee & St. Paul Railway.

The Village of Saukville incorporated out of some of the Town of Saukville's land in 1915. In 1973, the Village of Newburg incorporated from some of the Town of Saukville's land as well as land from the neighboring Town of Trenton in Washington County.

== Geography ==
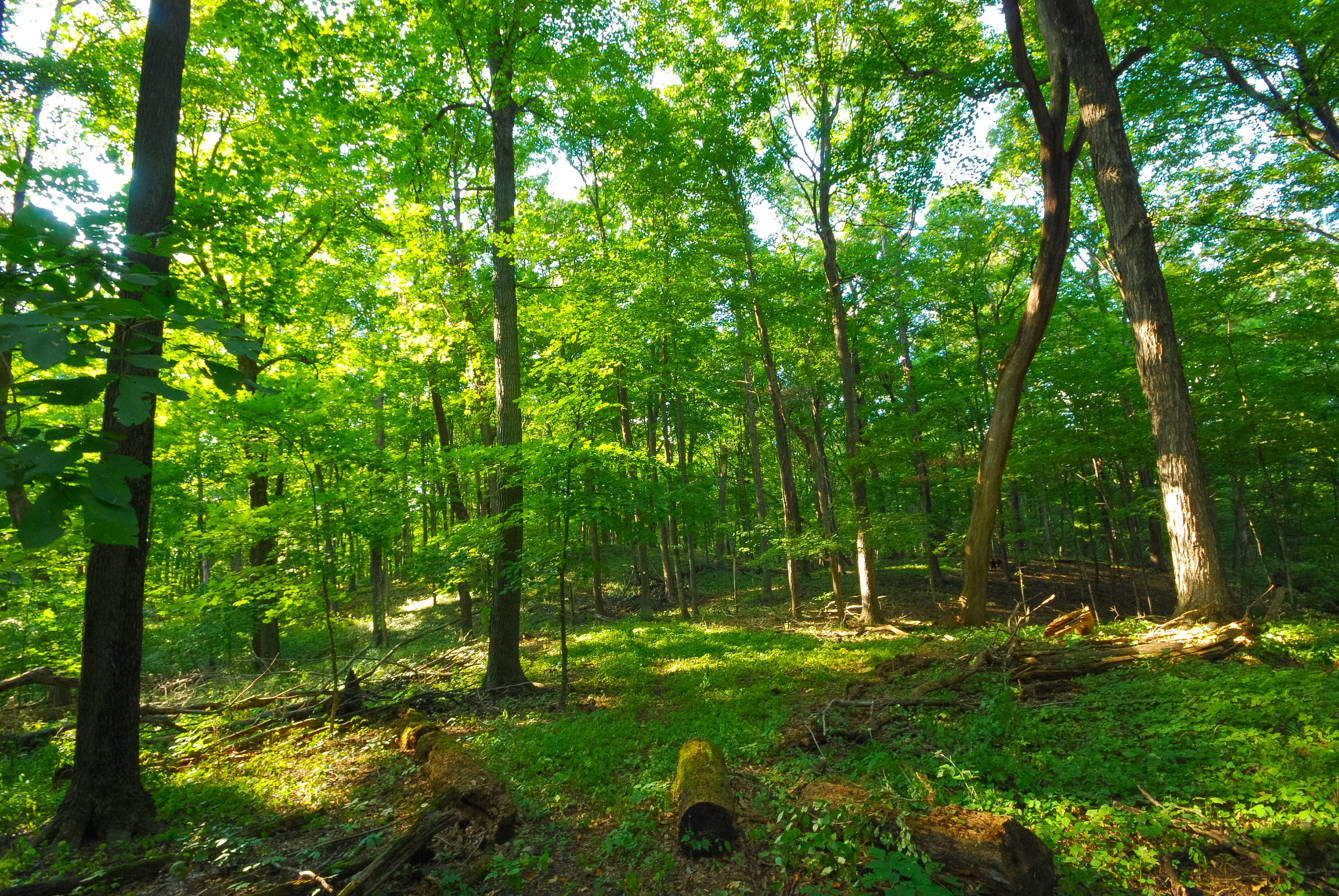
The Cedarburg Beech Woods State Natural Area west of the village contains an old-growth beech-maple forest, much like the ones that blanketed Saukville before settlers arrived in the 1800s.

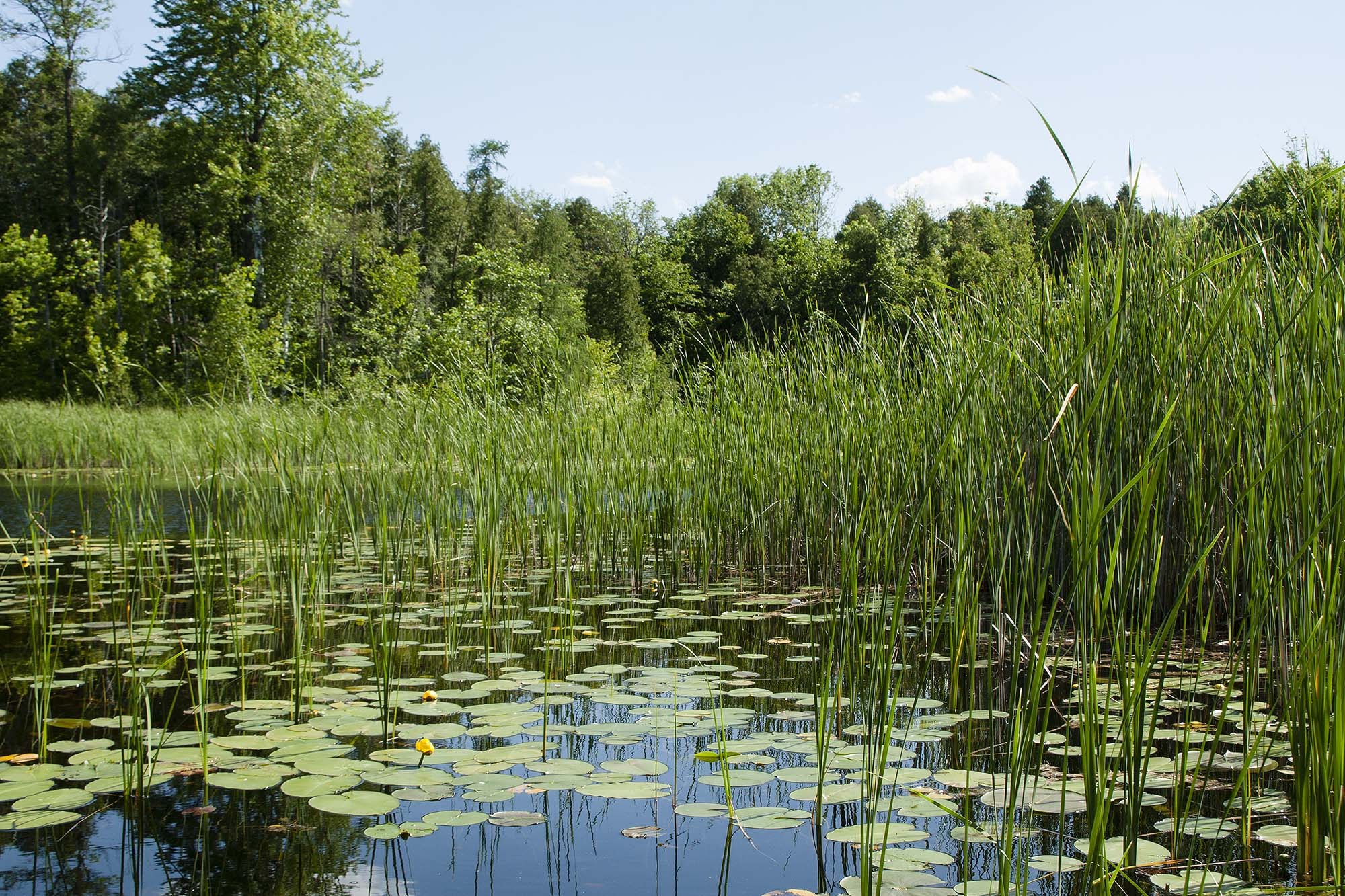
The Cedarburg Bog State Natural Area contains many biodiverse wetlands with plant species seen in few other ecosystems.

According to the United States Census Bureau, the town has a total area of 33.3 square miles (86.4 km^{2}), of which 32.7 square miles (84.6 km^{2}) is land and 0.7 square miles (1.8 km^{2}) (2.04%) is water. The Village of Saukville is located in what was formerly the town's southeastern quadrant. The town borders Waubeka, the Town of Fredonia, and the Village of Fredonia to the north; the Town of Port Washington to the east; the Town of Grafton and the Cedarburg (town), Wisconsin to the south; and the Town of Trenton and the Village of Newburg to the west.

The town is located in the Southeastern Wisconsin glacial till plains that were created by the Wisconsin glaciation during the most recent ice age. The town has many glacial landforms, including kames, kettles, and moraines. Much of the community is located on the Racine Dolomite formation that stretches through eastern Wisconsin and Illinois. The formation contains Silurian marine fossils, and while much of the rock lies between 25 and 50 feet below the surface, the fossils of a prehistoric reef can be seen in some old quarries in the northern part of the Village of Saukville as well as in the 50-foot-high bluff along the Milwaukee River at Riveredge Nature Center.

Before white settlers arrived in the area, the Saukville area was an upland forest dominated by American beech and sugar maple trees. There were also white cedars growing along the Milwaukee River and several thousand acres of coniferous swamp in Saukville's southwestern quadrant. Much of the original forest—with the exception of the coniferous swamps—was cleared to prepare the land for agriculture. The Cedarburg Beech Woods State Natural Area in the western part of the town has old growth endemic trees with minimal damage from logging and retains the character of the pre-settlement beech-maple forests.

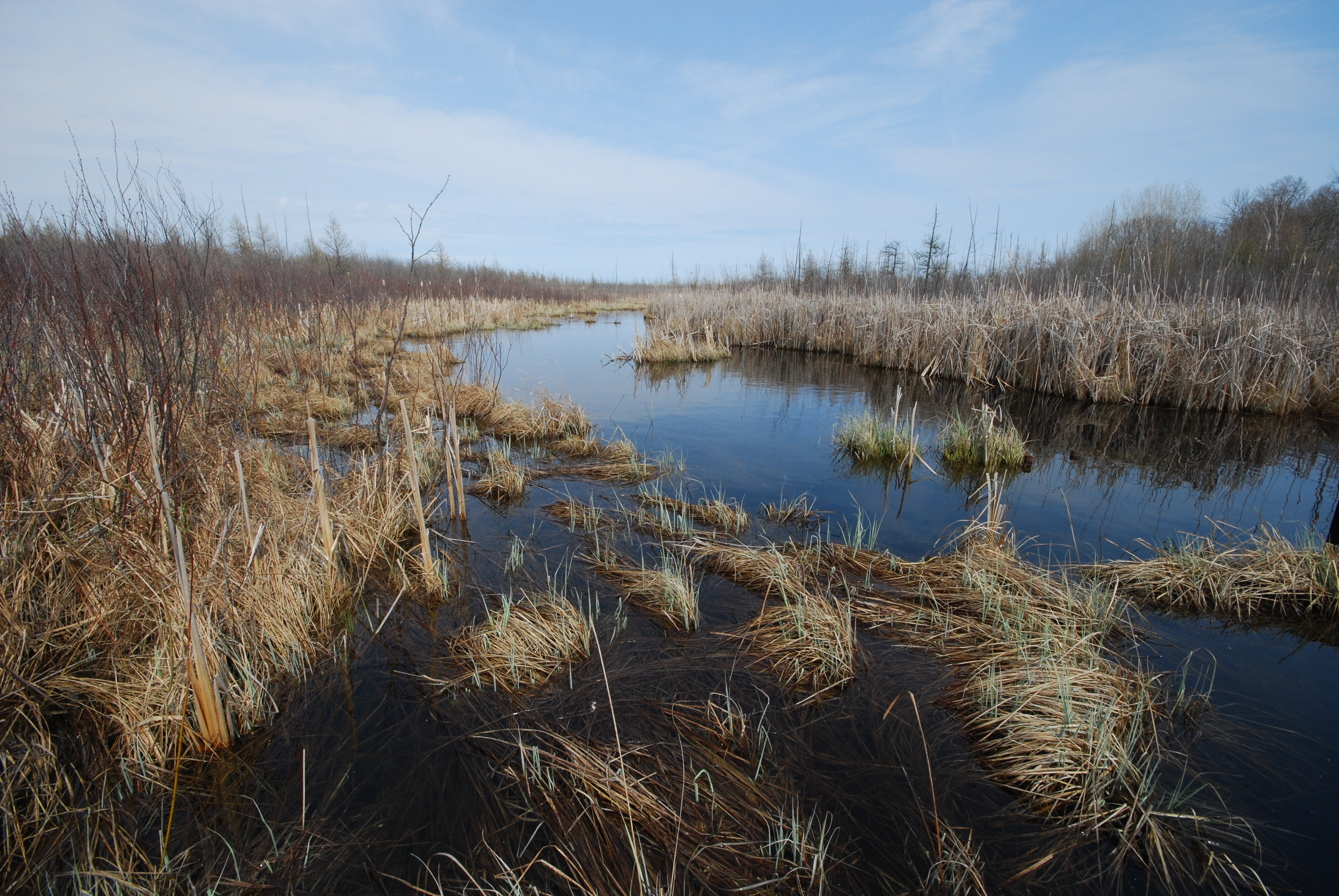
A network of streams, ponds and lakes flow through the Cedarburg Bog. Many of the Saukville area's bogs and swamps are flooded glacial kettles formed during the most recent ice age.

The town has many nature preserves and other undisturbed natural areas, the largest of which is the Cedarburg Bog State Natural Area, a 2,200-acre National Natural Landmark with high biodiversity, which is home to many endangered plant and animal species. The largest and best preserved bog in eastern Wisconsin, it contains two lakes, extensive white cedar and tamarack coniferous swamps, and the southernmost string bog on Earth. The bog is a habitat for several carnivorous plant species, including bladderworts, pitcher plants, and round-leafed sundews. The U.S. Fish and Wildlife Service also considers the Cedarburg Bog to be an important habitat for the endangered Hine's emerald dragonfly.

Other bogs in the town include black spruce swamps, which are rarely found at such southerly latitudes. Other bog plants that occur in Saukville include leatherleaf, snakemouth orchids, grass-pink orchids, bog-rosemary, winterberry, blueberry, and cranberry. The town is also a habitat for the threatened forked aster plant and the American gromwell, which is a state-designated special concern plant species.

As land development continues to reduce wild areas, wildlife is forced into closer proximity with human communities like Saukville. Large mammals, including white-tailed deer, coyotes, North American river otters and red foxes can be seen in the town. Many birds, including great blue herons and wild turkeys are found in the town with the many swamps and bogs providing a habit birds such as the osprey.

The region struggles with many invasive species, including the emerald ash borer, common carp, reed canary grass, the common reed, purple loosestrife, garlic mustard, Eurasian buckthorns, and honeysuckles.

== Demographics ==
As of the census of 2000, there were 1,755 people, 622 households, and 518 families residing in the town. The population density was 53.7 people per square mile (20.7/km^{2}). There were 644 housing units at an average density of 19.7 per square mile (7.6/km^{2}). The racial makeup of the town was 98.29% White, 0.28% Black or African American, 0.40% Native American, 0.23% Asian, 0.57% from other races, and 0.23% from two or more races. 1.31% of the population were Hispanic or Latino of any race.

There were 622 households, out of which 35.2% had children under the age of 18 living with them, 76.2% were married couples living together, 4.2% had a female householder with no husband present, and 16.6% were non-families. 12.9% of all households were made up of individuals, and 4.8% had someone living alone who was 65 years of age or older. The average household size was 2.82 and the average family size was 3.11.

In the town, the population was spread out, with 26.5% under the age of 18, 5.5% from 18 to 24, 28.3% from 25 to 44, 28.4% from 45 to 64, and 11.3% who were 65 years of age or older. The median age was 40 years. For every 100 females, there were 107.9 males. For every 100 females age 18 and over, there were 102.2 males.

The median income for a household in the town was $60,435, and the median income for a family was $64,821. Males had a median income of $46,552 versus $31,406 for females. The per capita income for the town was $24,522. About 1.9% of families and 2.6% of the population were below the poverty line, including none of those under age 18 and 8.4% of those age 65 or over.

== Law and government ==
Saukville is organized as a town governed by an elected board, comprising a chairman and two supervisors. The current chairman is Kevin Kimmes.

As part of Wisconsin's 6th congressional district, the town is represented by Glenn Grothman (R) in the United States House of Representatives, and by Ron Johnson (R) and Tammy Baldwin (D) in the United States Senate. Duey Stroebel (R) represents Saukville in the Wisconsin State Senate, and Robert Brooks (R) represents Saukville in the Wisconsin State Assembly.

== Education ==
The Town of Saukville is served by two public school districts: the joint Port Washington-Saukville School District and the Northern Ozaukee School District, which also covers Fredonia, Newburg, and parts of the Town of Belgium. Students in the Port Washington-Saukville School District attend Saukville Elementary School for kindergarten through fourth grade, Thomas Jefferson Middle School for fifth through eighth grades, and Port Washington High School for ninth through twelfth grades. Students in the Northern Ozaukee School District attend Ozaukee Elementary School for kindergarten through fifth grade, Ozaukee Middle School for sixth through eighth grades, and Ozaukee High School for grades nine through twelve.

Additionally, the Riveredge School is a tuition-free, public elementary charter school authorized by the Northern Ozaukee School District. Located at the Riveredge Nature Center in the northwestern Town of Saukville near the municipal boundary with the Village of Newburg, the school serves children from kindergarten through fifth grade.

The University of Wisconsin–Milwaukee Field Station is a 320-acre nature preserve and laboratory adjacent to the Cedarburg Bog State Natural Area in the town. The field station grounds and laboratories are not open to the general public, but are used by university students and faculty to conduct biological and ecological research.

== Transportation ==
Interstate 43 passes through the southeastern part of the Town of Saukville with Exit 96 servicing the Village of Saukville. Wisconsin Highway 57 and Wisconsin Highway 33 also pass through the town.

Saukville has limited public transit compared with larger cities. Ozaukee County and the Milwaukee County Transit System run the Route 143 commuter bus, also known as the "Ozaukee County Express," to Milwaukee via Interstate 43. The bus stops in the Saukville Walmart parking lot, near I-43 Exit 96. The stop is the route's northern terminus. The bus operates Monday through Friday with limited hours corresponding to peak commute times. Ozaukee County Transit Services' Shared Ride Taxi is the public transit option for traveling to sites not directly accessible from the interstate. The taxis operate seven days a week and make connections to Washington County Transit and Milwaukee County Routes 12, 49 and 42u.

The Wisconsin and Southern Railroad operates a freight line passing through the eastern part of the town. The community currently does not have a passenger train station.

== Nature preserves, parks and recreation ==
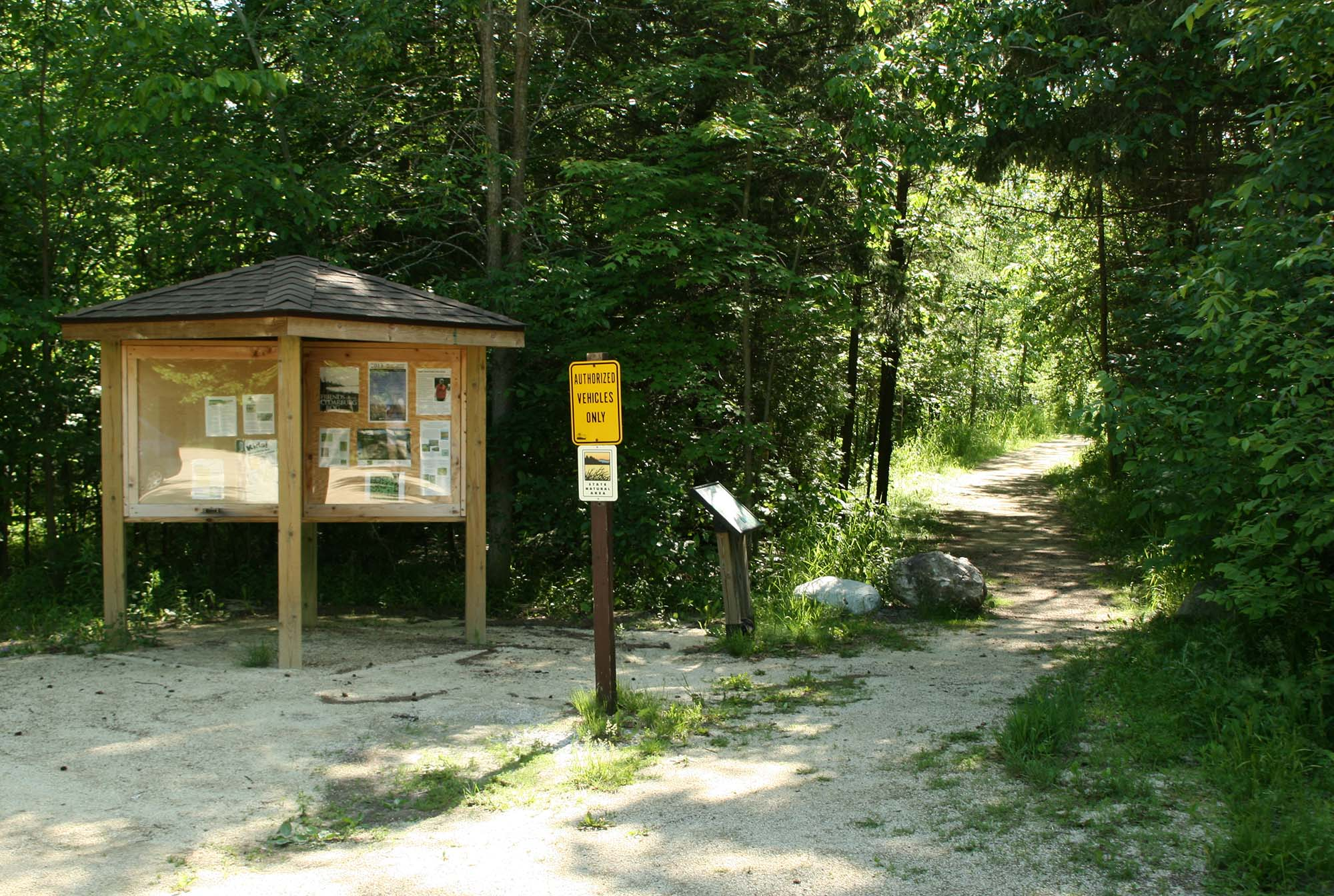
Hikers can access the 2,200-acre Cedarburg Bog via a network of trails and boardwalks.

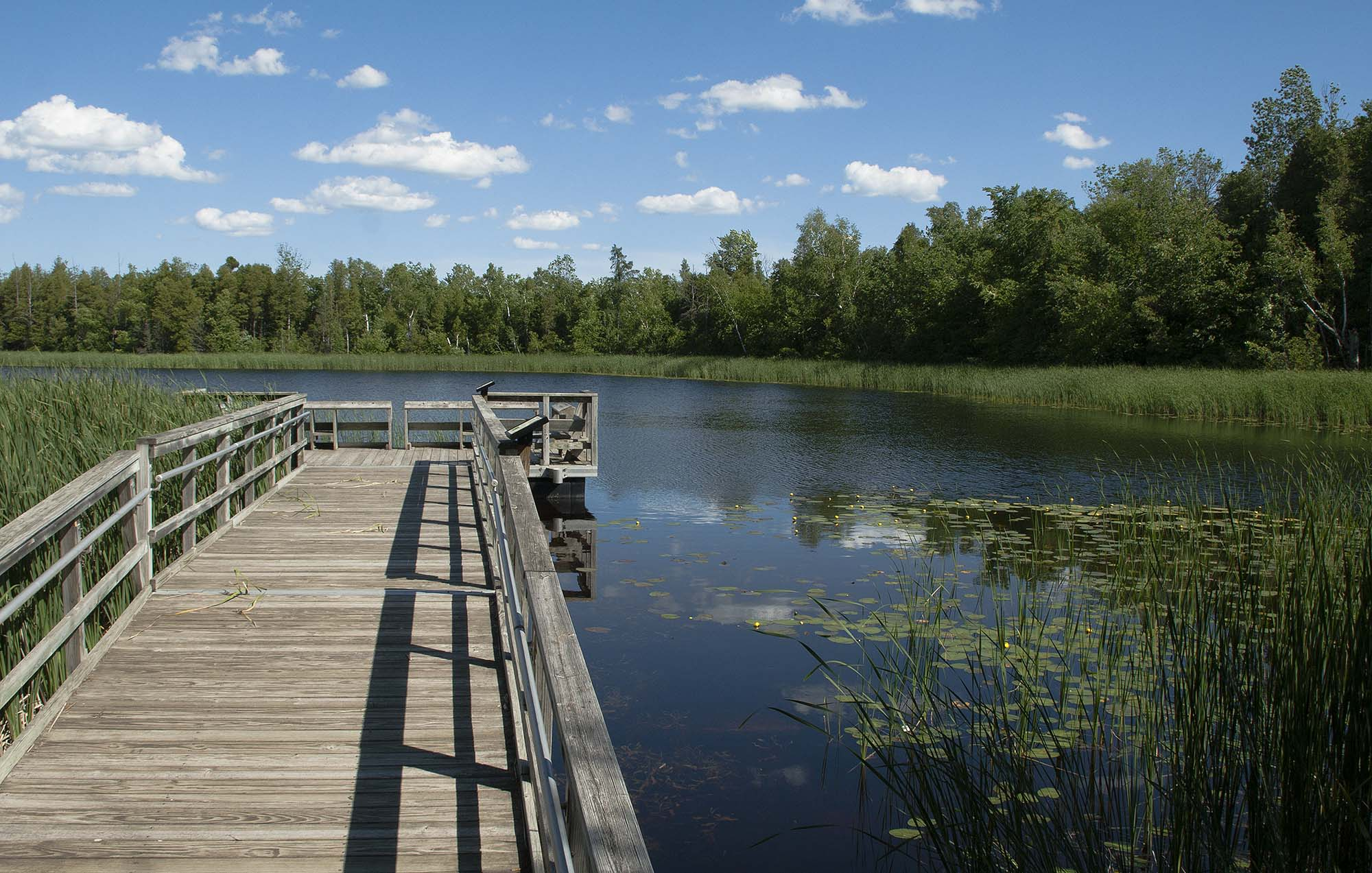
The boardwalk at the Cedarburg Bog extends into Mud Lake and provides opportunities for birdwatching.

=== State natural areas ===
- Cedarburg Beech Woods: The Cedarburg Beech Woods is a 74-acre nature preserve owned by the University of Wisconsin-Milwaukee, containing tamarack swamps and old-growth beech-maple forests dating to the time before white settlers cleared much of Ozaukee County's forests for agriculture.
- Cedarburg Bog: The Cedarburg Bog State Natural Area is a 2,200-acre National Natural Landmark with high biodiversity. The area has hiking trails with views of the largest and best preserved bog in eastern Wisconsin and a boardwalk and birdwatching platform on Mud Lake in the center of the preserve.
- Riveredge Creek and Ephemeral Pond: The Riveredge Nature Center—a private, nonprofit education facility—maintains a 61-acre nature preserve rich in plant and insect life near the confluence of Riveredge Creek and the Milwaukee River. The nature center contains glacial landforms typical of the Kettle Moraine region and 50-foot-high Silurian dolomite bluffs along the river.
- Sapa Spruce Bog: The Sapa Spruce Bog is a 24-acre nature preserve owned by the University of Wisconsin-Milwaukee. Located in a flooded glacially formed kettle, the bog occurs farther south than other black spruce-tamarack bogs typically do. The Sapa Spruce Bog is more acidic than other bogs in the region, creating a unique ecosystem of flora and fauna—including six species of Sphagnum moss—not typically seen so far south.

=== Ozaukee County Parks ===
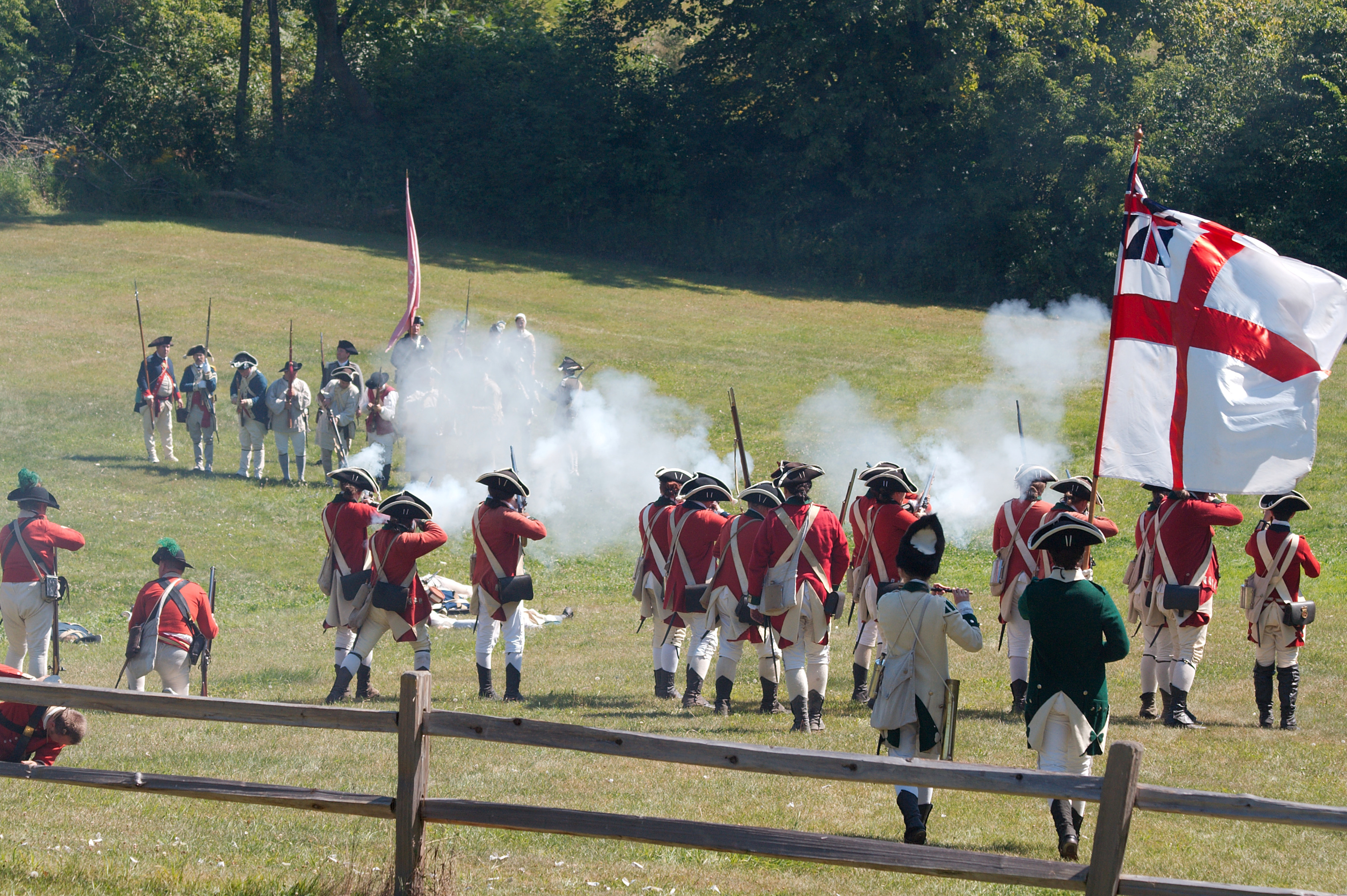
An historical reenactment at Ozaukee County Pioneer Village.

- Ehlers Park: A narrow seven-acre park on the east bank of the Milwaukee River, Ehlers Park has 2,200 feet of river front with canoe launches and fishing spots.
- Hawthorne Hills Park, H. H. Peters Youth Camp, and Ozaukee County Pioneer Village: Located on the Milwaukee River in northeastern Saukville, these three, sandwiched-together county parks offer a wide range of activities. Hawthorne Hills Park features 57 acres of undeveloped forest with hiking trails on the river as well as an 18-hole golf course. The adjacent H. H. Peters Youth Camp is an additional 40 acres with hiking trails liked to Hawthorne Hills and a camp hall with showers and restrooms. Pioneer Village is directly north of the Hawthorne Hills Golf Course and is an open-air museum that preserves twenty-four buildings from the 1840s through the early 1900s, providing a snapshot of village life in early Ozaukee County.
- Tendick Nature Park: The 122-acre Tendick Nature Park has a boardwalk through wetlands, a canoe launch on the Milwaukee River, an archery range, and picnic facilities.

=== Ozaukee Washington Land Trust ===
- Shannon Preserve: A 34-acre nature preserve with hardwood forests, cattail swamps, and a lake, the Shannon Preserve has hiking trails and opportunities for birdwatching.

Additionally, the Blue Heron Wildlife Sanctuary on the Milwaukee River is a private, nonprofit nature center with 92-acres of land, hiking trails, and wildlife rehabilitation facilities. North American river otters have been spotted from the sanctuary's trails.

The Town of Saukville is also home to The Bog, a private, 18-hole golf course located east of the Cedarburg Bog.
