= Saukville, Wisconsin =

Village in Ozaukee County, Wisconsin

- Village
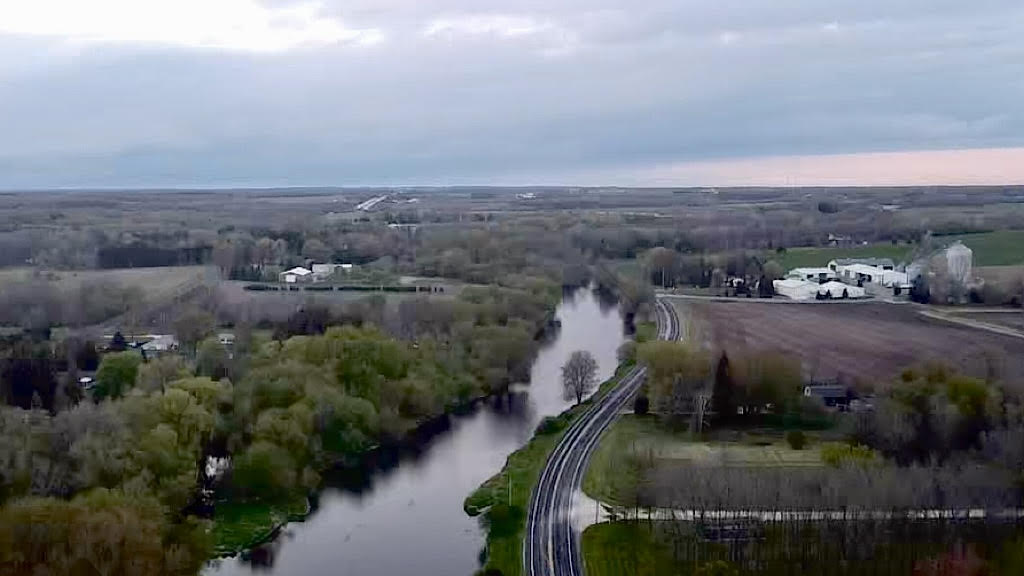
- The Milwaukee River in Saukville, Wisconsin

- Location of Saukville in Ozaukee County, Wisconsin.
- Coordinates: 43°24′22″N 87°57′47″W
- Country: United States
- State: Wisconsin
- County: Ozaukee
- Settled: c. 1845
- Incorporated: 1915; 111 years ago

Government
  - Village President: Andy Hebein
  - Administrator: Dawn M. Wagner
  - Clerk: Mary Kay Baumann
  - Village board: Trustees: Andy Hebein; Richard Belling; Scott Fischer; Jim Nowlen; vacant; Trevor Seitz

Area
  - Total: 3.57 sq mi (9.25 km^{2})
  - Land: 3.52 sq mi (9.12 km^{2})
  - Water: 0.050 sq mi (0.13 km^{2})
- Elevation: 889 ft (271 m)

Population (2020)
  - Total: 4,258
  - Density: 1,259.1/sq mi (486.15/km^{2})
- Time zone: UTC-6 (Central (CST))
  - Summer (DST): UTC-5 (CDT)
- Area code: 262
- FIPS code: 55-71725
- GNIS feature ID: 1573739
- Website: www.villageofsaukvillewi.gov

Saukville is a village in Ozaukee County, Wisconsin, United States. Located on the Milwaukee River with a district along Interstate 43, the community is a suburb in the Milwaukee metropolitan area. The population was 4,258 at the 2020 census.

Downtown Saukville was the site of a Native American village at the crossroads of two trails before white settlers arrived in the mid-1840s. In its early years, the community was a stagecoach stop on the road from Milwaukee to Green Bay and also grew as a mill and market town serving the dairy farmers of northwestern Ozaukee County. The village incorporated in 1915 and later in the 20th century grew into a suburban community with a manufacturing-based economy. As of 2019, more than 40% of the village's jobs were in manufacturing, with the largest employers being a steel mill as well as several foundries and metal fabricators.

The village and the neighboring Town of Saukville are rich in biodiverse bogs and coniferous swamps, the largest of which is the 2,200-acre Cedarburg Bog State Natural Area. The area's bogs are a habitat for endangered species, many types of birds, and carnivorous plants. Among other landforms, the Cedarburg Bog contains a string bog—a geographic feature that seldom occurs as far south as Wisconsin—which contains many plant species rarely seen outside remote parts of Canada.

== History ==
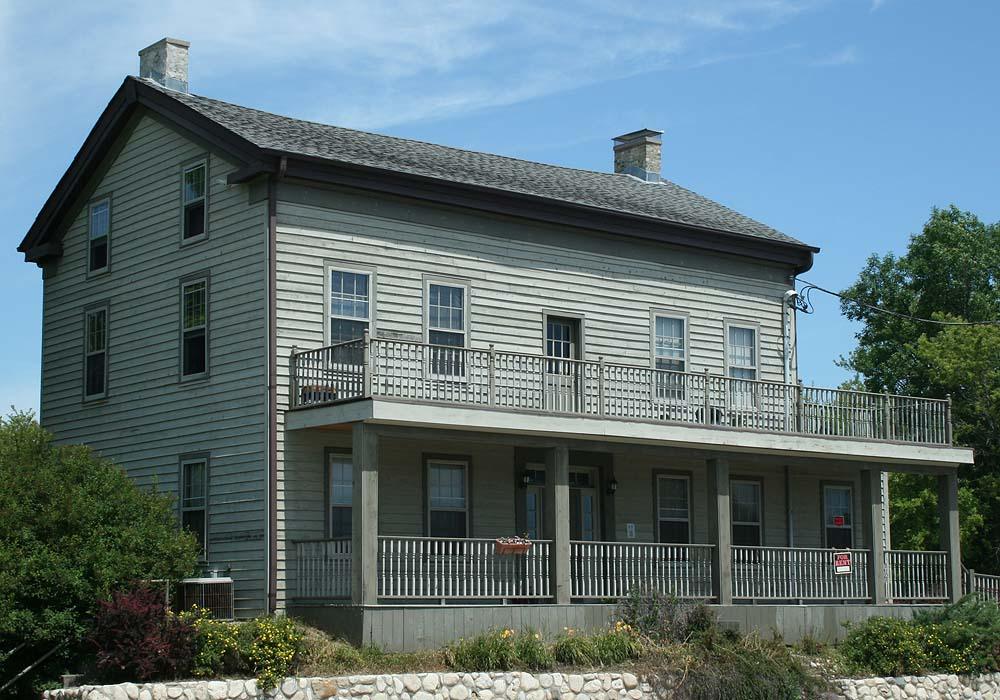
The Payne Hotel stagecoach stop, constructed in 1848

Saukville was the site of a Native American village at the crossroads of the Milwaukee River and two trails, one of which became the north–south Green Bay Road and the other the east–west Dekora Road. The area was populated centuries before the first European settlers arrived. In the mid-19th century, Increase A. Lapham identified a group of circular mounds near Saukville and found a stone ax. Lapham did not speculate about the age of the artifact or the mounds. An additional artifact of the early Native American presence in the area is the Ozaukee County Birdstone, discovered by a six-year-old farm boy in 1891. While the exact age of the Ozaukee County Birdstone remains uncertain, many birdstones date from a period ranging from 3000 BCE to 500 BCE.

By the early 1800s, the Native Americans in the Saukville area were probably Menominee and Sauk people, who were forced to leave Wisconsin in the 1830s. White settlers arrived in the area around 1845 and began to build along Green Bay Road.

Saukville was part of the town of Port Washington until 1848 when the town of Saukville was established. In that year, William Payne opened a stagecoach inn for travelers on the route from Milwaukee to Green Bay. The Payne Hotel still stands today and is listed on the National Register of Historic Places. In 1848, several residents constructed a dam on the Milwaukee River and later built a saw mill and a grist mill. Throughout the 19th and early 20th centuries, Saukville was a rural community with many dairy farmers.

In 1871, a rail line was constructed in the community. It would eventually become part of the Chicago, Milwaukee & St. Paul Railway.

In 1915, the village of Saukville officially incorporated with a vote of 66 in favor and 40 opposed. At that time, the village had a population of 376 people.

In 1945, sixty German prisoners of war from Camp Fredonia in Little Kohler, Wisconsin were contracted to work at Canned Goods, Inc. in the village to make up for the loss of labor due to local men fighting in World War II.

Saukville experienced significant population growth following World War II. Between 1950 and 1980, the village population increased five-times over, from 699 to 3,494. The construction of Interstate 43 in the mid-1960s connected Saukville to other communities, such as Milwaukee and Sheboygan.

== Geography ==
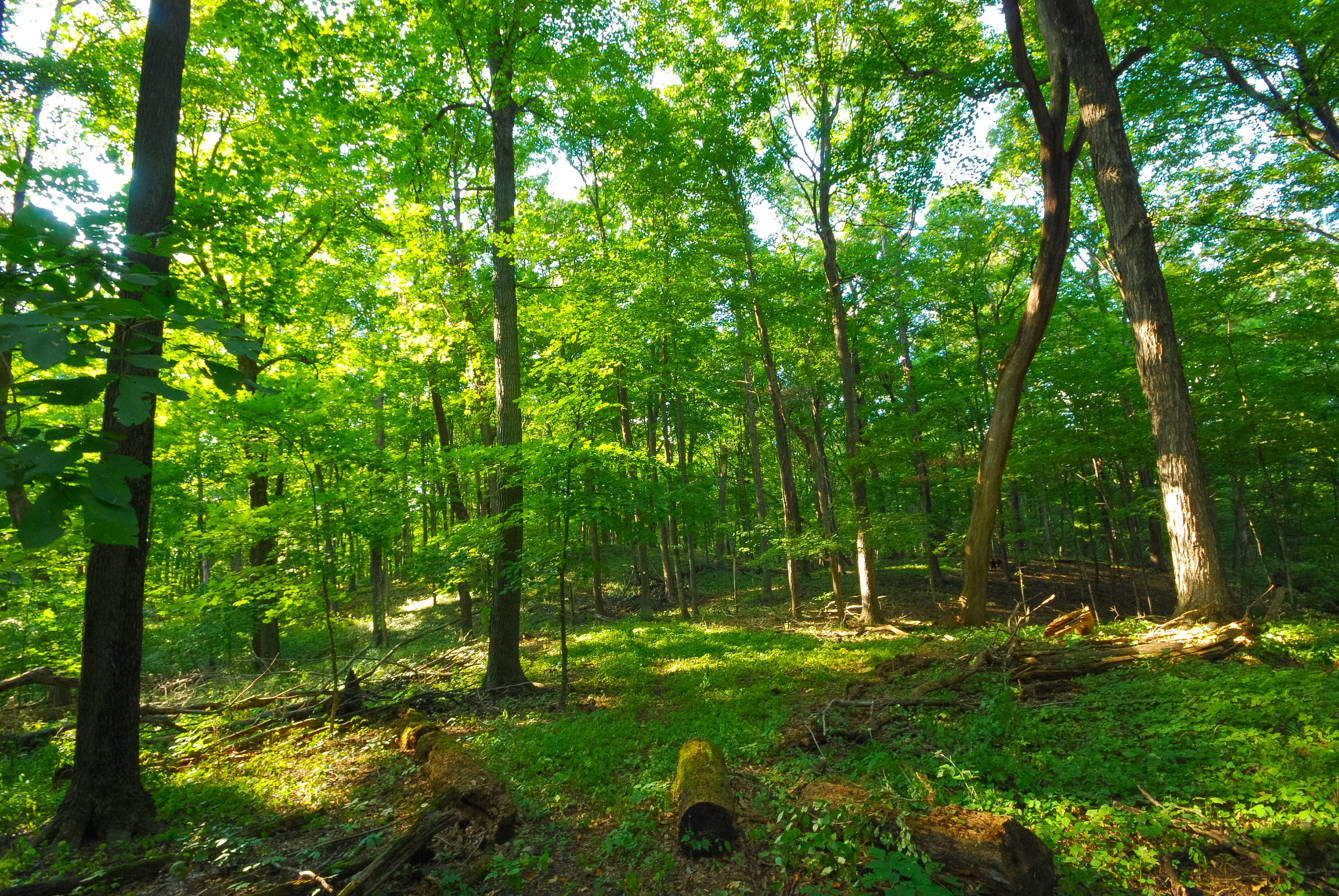
The Cedarburg Beech Woods State Natural Area west of the village contains an old-growth beech-maple forest, much like the ones that blanketed Saukville before settlers arrived in the 1800s.

Saukville is located at 43°22′52″N 87°56′40″W (43.38137, −87.944578). According to the United States Census Bureau, the village has a total area of 3.85 square miles (9.97 km^{2}), of which, 3.80 square miles (9.84 km^{2}) is land and 0.05 square miles (0.13 km^{2}) is water. The village perimeter is bordered by the Town of Saukville to the north and west, the Town of Port Washington to the east and southeast and by the Town of Grafton to the south and southwest.

The village is located in the Southeastern Wisconsin glacial till plains that were created by the Wisconsin glaciation during the most recent ice age. Much of the community is located on the Saukville Reef formation, which is part of the Racine Dolomite that stretches through eastern Wisconsin and Illinois. The formation contains Silurian marine fossils, and while much of the rock lies between 25 and 50 feet below the surface, it's exposed at some old quarries in the northern part of the village.

Before white settlers arrived in the area, the Saukville area was an upland forest dominated by American beech and sugar maple trees. There were also white cedars growing along the Milwaukee River, which flows north–south through Saukville. Much of the original forest was cleared to prepare the land for agriculture. The Kurtz Woods State Natural Area in the village, maintained by the Ozaukee Washington Land Trust, has old growth endemic trees and retains the character of the pre-settlement beech-maple forests.

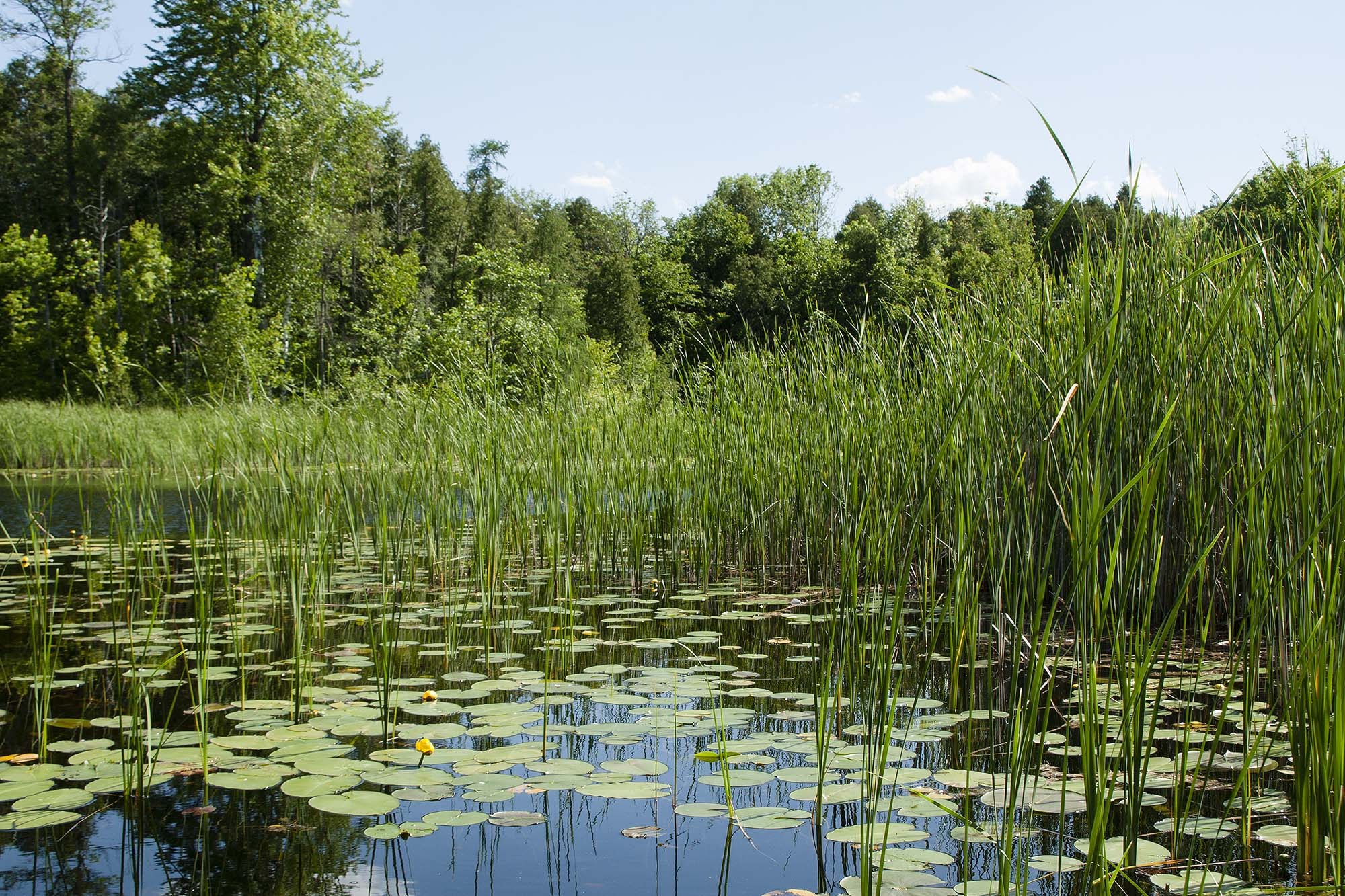
The Cedarburg Bog State Natural Area contains many biodiverse wetlands with plant species seen in few other ecosystems.

The village is east of the Cedarburg Bog, a 2,200 acre state natural area, which is home to many endangered plant and animal species. Located in the Town of Saukville, the bog contains two lakes, extensive white cedar and tamarack swamps, and the southernmost string bog on Earth. The bog is a habitat for several carnivorous plant species, including bladderworts, pitcher plants, and sundews.

As land development continues to reduce wild areas, wildlife is forced into closer proximity with human communities like Saukville. Large mammals, including white-tailed deer, coyotes, North American river otters and red foxes can be seen in the village. Many birds, including great blue herons and wild turkeys, are found in the village.

The region struggles with many invasive species, including the emerald ash borer, common carp, reed canary grass, the common reed, purple loosestrife, garlic mustard, Eurasian buckthorns, and honeysuckles.

== Demographics ==
Historical population
Census	Pop.	Note	%±
1920	330		—
1930	399		20.9%
1940	431		8.0%
1950	699		62.2%
1960	1,038		48.5%
1970	1,389		33.8%
1980	3,494		151.5%
1990	3,695		5.8%
2000	4,068		10.1%
2010	4,451		9.4%
2020	4,258		−4.3%
U.S. Decennial Census

=== 2010 census ===
As of the census of 2010, there were 4,451 people, 1,766 households, and 1,208 families living in the village. The population density was 1,171.3 inhabitants per square mile (452.2/km^{2}). There were 1,848 housing units at an average density of 486.3 per square mile (187.8/km^{2}). The racial makeup of the village was 96.0% White, 0.7% African American, 0.4% Native American, 0.7% Asian, 0.6% from other races, and 1.6% from two or more races. Hispanic or Latino of any race were 2.9% of the population.

There were 1,766 households, of which 36.2% had children under the age of 18 living with them, 53.6% were married couples living together, 10.4% had a female householder with no husband present, 4.4% had a male householder with no wife present, and 31.6% were non-families. 26.2% of all households were made up of individuals, and 5.7% had someone living alone who was 65 years of age or older. The average household size was 2.52 and the average family size was 3.06.

The median age in the village was 36.7 years. 26.2% of residents were under the age of 18; 7.6% were between the ages of 18 and 24; 29.4% were from 25 to 44; 28.1% were from 45 to 64; and 8.7% were 65 years of age or older. The gender makeup of the village was 50.2% male and 49.8% female.

=== 2000 census ===
As of the census of 2000, there were 4,068 people, 1,583 households, and 1,104 families living in the village. The population density was 1,366.3 people per square mile (527.1/km^{2}). There were 1,639 housing units at an average density of 550.5 per square mile (212.4/km^{2}). The racial makeup of the village was 97.42% White, 0.57% Black or African American, 0.15% Native American, 0.61% Asian, 0.32% from other races, and 0.93% from two or more races. 2.19% of the population were Hispanic or Latino of any race.

There were 1,583 households, out of which 38.0% had children under the age of 18 living with them, 55.2% were married couples living together, 10.4% had a female householder with no husband present, and 30.2% were non-families. 24.1% of all households were made up of individuals, and 5.6% had someone living alone who was 65 years of age or older. The average household size was 2.56 and the average family size was 3.07.

In the village, the population was spread out, with 27.5% under the age of 18, 9.5% from 18 to 24, 34.8% from 25 to 44, 21.0% from 45 to 64, and 7.2% who were 65 years of age or older. The median age was 33 years. For every 100 females, there were 103.6 males. For every 100 females age 18 and over, there were 100.5 males.

The median income for a household in the village was $53,159, and the median income for a family was $62,436. Males had a median income of $41,625 versus $28,583 for females. The per capita income for the village was $22,035. About 1.4% of families and 3.1% of the population were below the poverty line, including 3.4% of those under age 18 and 9.5% of those age 65 or over.

== Economy ==
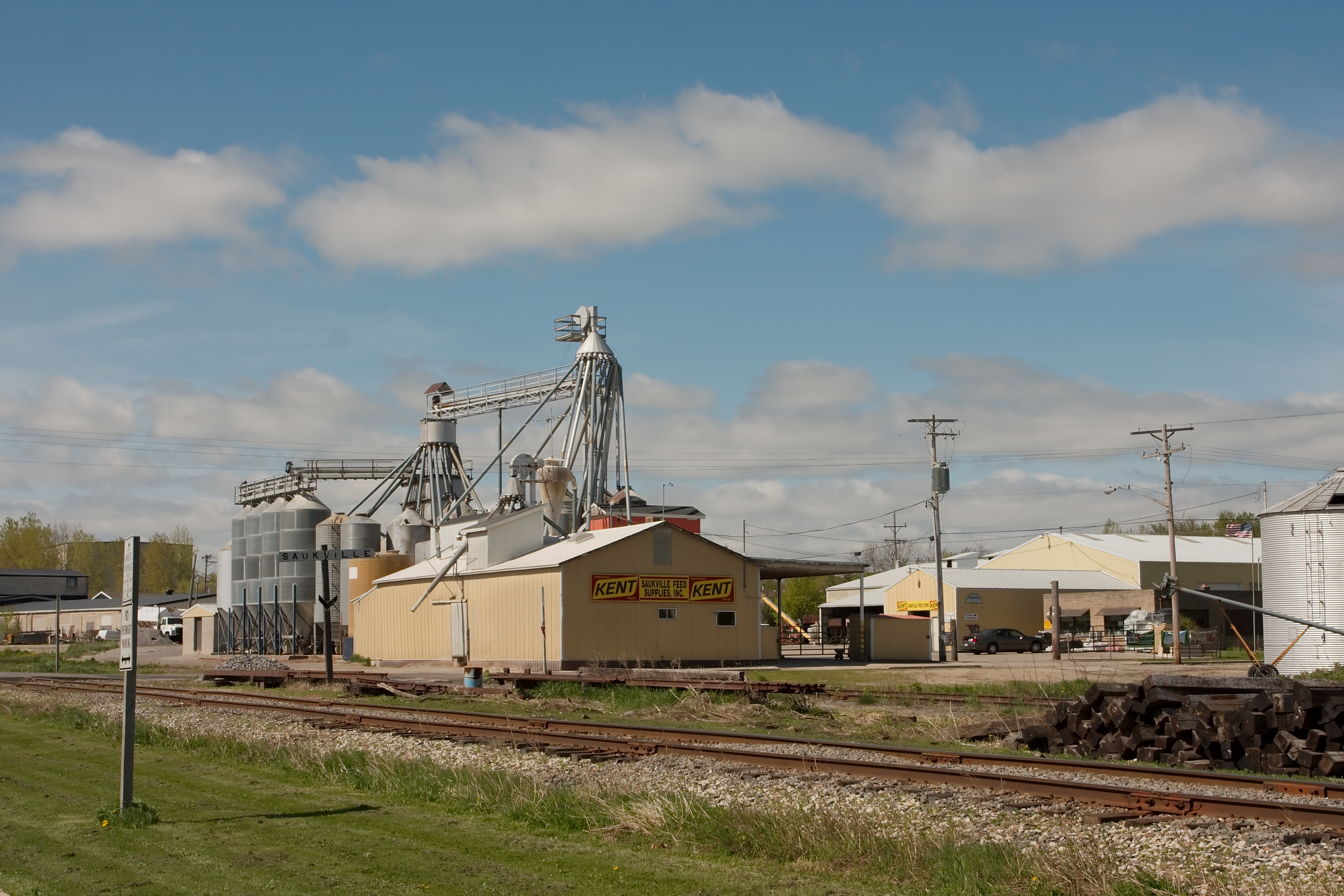
A grain elevator near the railroad in Saukville.

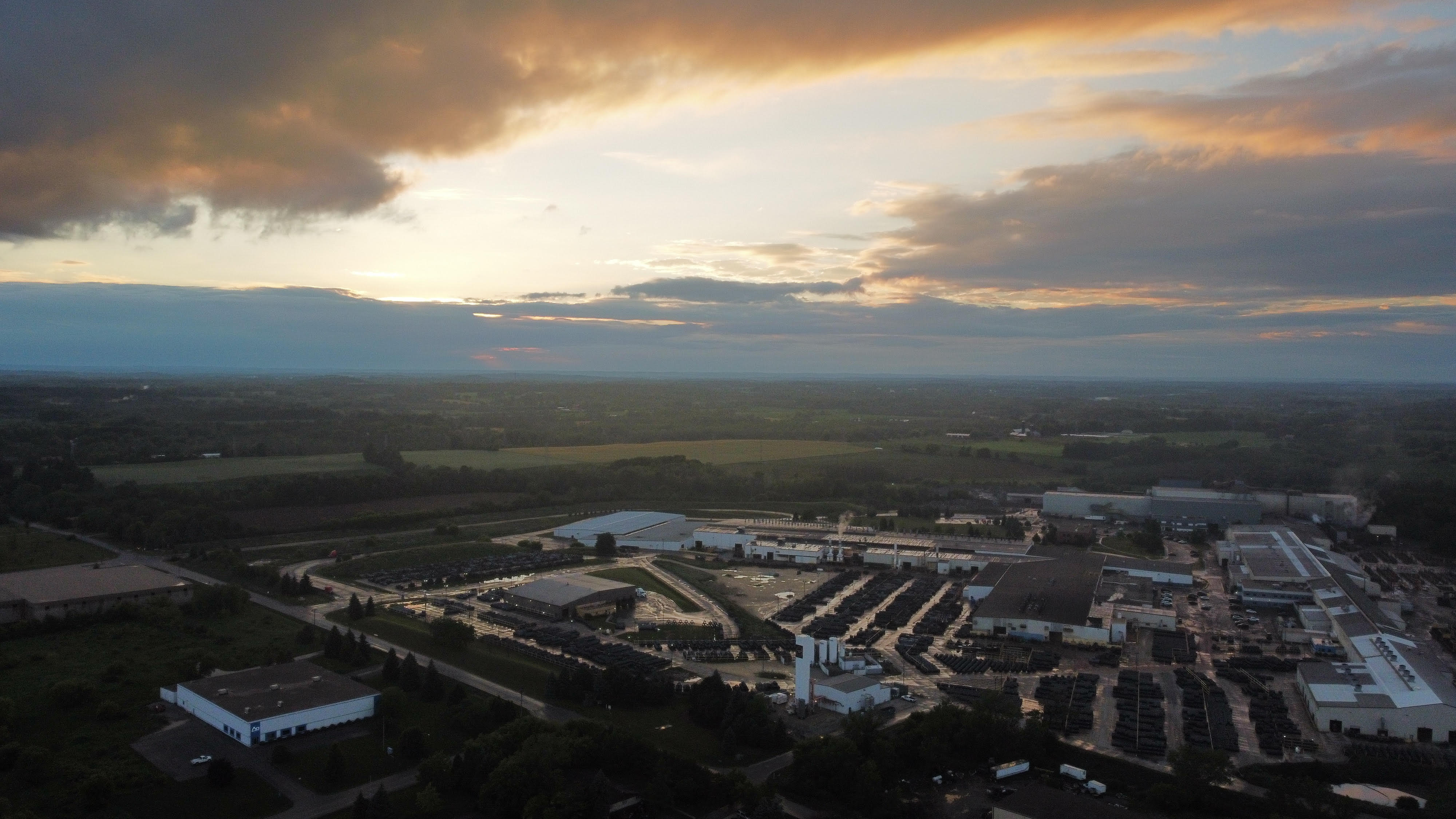
As of 2019, Charter Steel was the largest employer in Saukville.

Saukville's early economy was primarily agricultural, and the first major businesses were hydropowered mills on the Milwaukee River as well as other businesses that served the local farmers. In the late 19th century and into the 20th century, dairy farming was a major industry in the Saukville area. As the village grew in the 20th century, the local economy diversified. As of 2019, manufacturing accounted for over 40% of local jobs, with three of the village's largest employers being metal manufacturers. Many of the village's manufacturers are located in the Dekora Woods Business and Industrial Park in north-central Saukville, west of Interstate 43.

Largest Employers in Saukville, 2019
Rank	Employer	Industry	Employees
1	Charter Steel	Iron, steel, and ferroalloy mill	500-999
2	Johnson Brass & Machine Foundry Inc.	Non-ferrous metal foundry	100-249
3	Sauk Technologies	Fabricated metal manufacturing	100-249
4	Walmart	Retail	100-249
5	YMCA	Civic and social organization	100-249
6	Jeneil Biotech Inc.	Spice and extract manufacturing	50-99
7	Oldenburg Metal Tech	Tool, die, and machining manufacturing	50-99
8	Pope Scientific	Industrial machine manufacturing	50-99
9	Piggly Wiggly	Retail (Grocery)	50-99
10	Eric von Schledorn Chevrolet Buick	Retail (car dealership)	50-99

== Culture ==
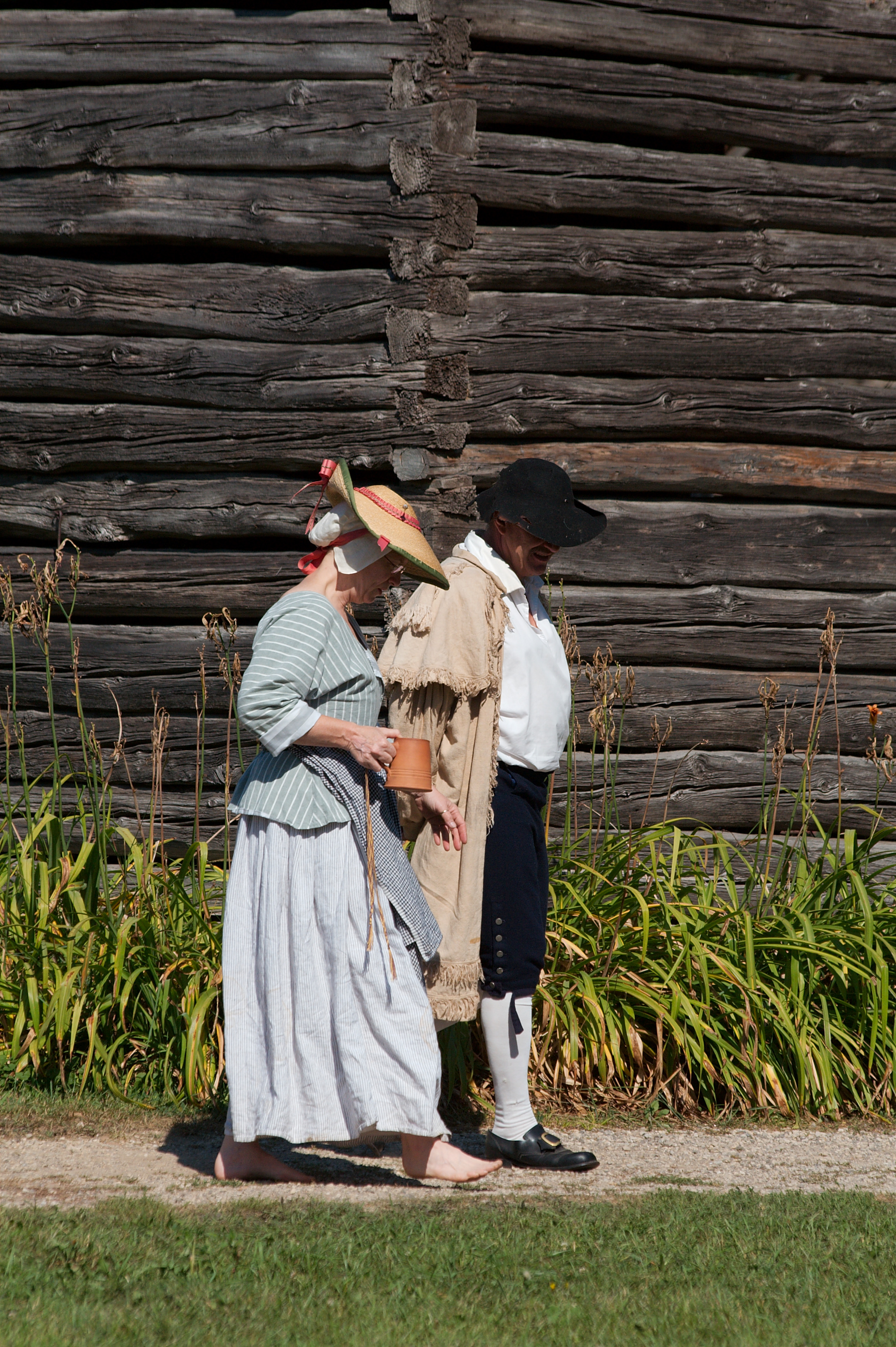
Pioneer Village is an open-air, living history museum that preserves buildings and experiences from the earliest decades of Ozaukee County's settlement.

=== Cinema ===
The Marcus Corporation operates a twelve-auditorium multiplex movie theater in Saukville. (closed in September 2023 due to lack of ticket sales a failing attendance following the pandemic shut down)

Source: Marcus Theaters

=== Events ===
The Saukville Area Historical Society hosts the Crossroads Rendezvous in Peninsula Park on the third weekend in May. The event is an educational reenactment of the annual rendezvous gatherings associated with Wisconsin's 18th and early 19th century fur trade. The event was originally held every year from 1991 to 2006. After a decade-long hiatus, the historical society began hosting the annual event again in 2017.

The village also hosts a farmers market in Veterans Park every Sunday from June through October, 9 a.m. to 1 p.m.

=== Museums ===
- Crossroads Museum: The Saukville Area Historical Society operates the Crossroads Museum, dedicated to Saukville's local history. The museum in housed in a restored firehouse that was built in 1912, and serves as the historical society's headquarters.
- Ozaukee County Pioneer Village: Located north of the village in the Town of Saukville, Pioneer Village is an open-air museum that preserves twenty-four buildings from the 1840s through the early 1900s, providing a snapshot of village life in early Ozaukee County.

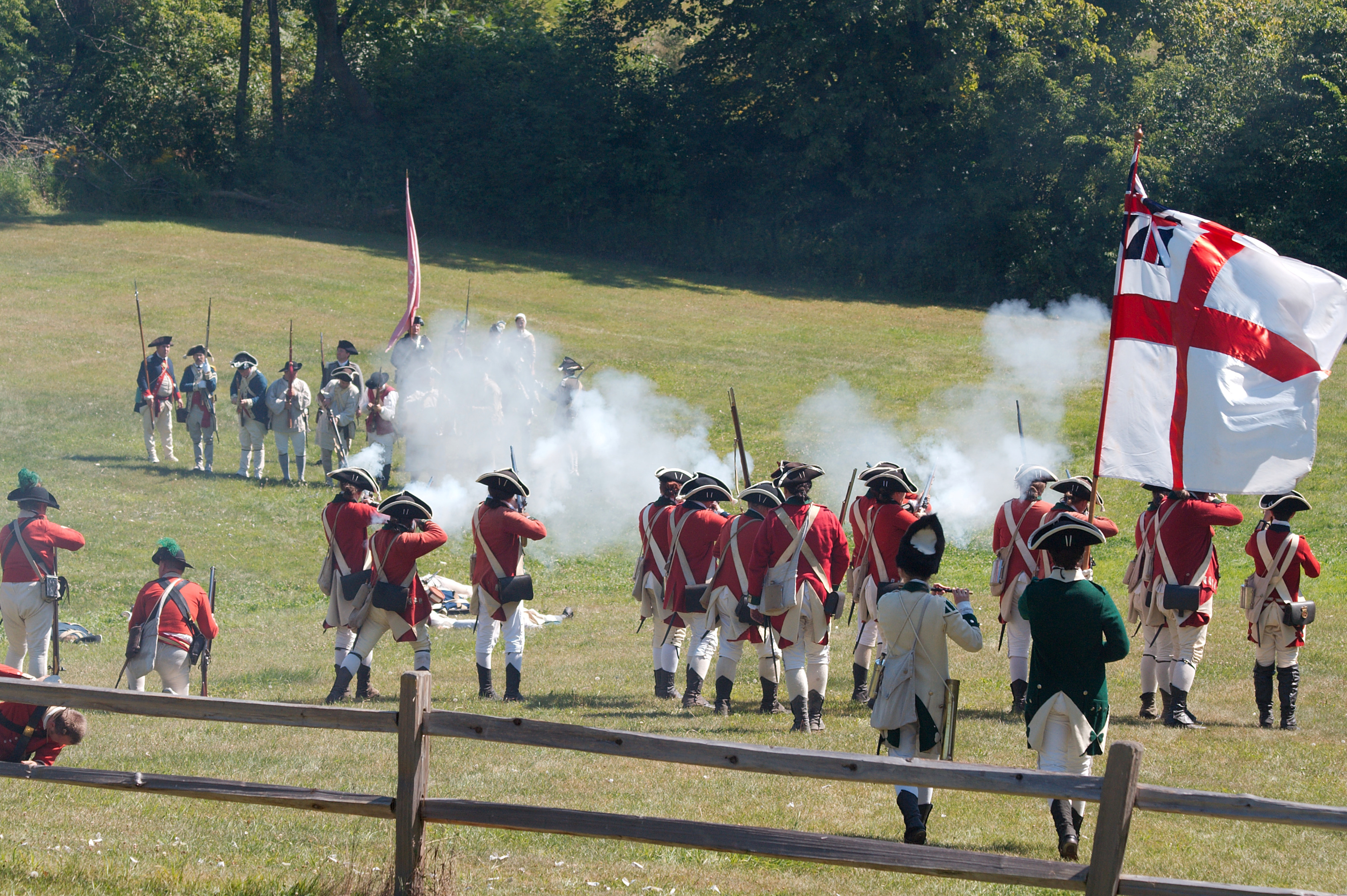
An historical battle reenactment at Pioneer Village.

=== Oscar Grady Public Library ===
The Oscar Grady Public Library has a collection of physical media, digital resources, and archival photos of the community. It facilitates literacy programs for children and is a member of the Monarch Library System, comprising thirty-one libraries in Ozaukee, Sheboygan, Washington, and Dodge counties.

=== Religion ===
Saukville's churches include Living Hope Lutheran Church, which is affiliated with the Evangelical Lutheran Church in America; Parkside Community United Church of Christ; River of Life Lutheran Church, which is a ministry of First Immanuel Lutheran Church of Cedarburg and is affiliated with the Missouri Synod; and St. John XXIII Catholic Church. St. John XXIII Catholic Church formed in 2016 from the merger of Saukville's Immaculate Conception Catholic Church with two churches in Port Washington. The parish also operates a parochial school in Port Washington for students from kindergarten through eighth grade.

== Law and government ==
Saukville is organized as a village governed by an elected village board, comprising a village president and six trustees. The current president is Barb Dickmann, who was first elected to the village board as a trustee in 1999 and has served as president since 2003. The board meets on the first and third Tuesday of each month at 8 p.m. in the municipal center. The village's day-to-day operations are managed by a full-time municipal administrator.

As part of Wisconsin's 6th congressional district, Saukville is represented by Glenn Grothman (R) in the United States House of Representatives, and by Ron Johnson (R) and Tammy Baldwin (D) in the United States Senate. Duey Stroebel (R) represents Saukville in the Wisconsin State Senate, and Robert Brooks (R) represents Saukville in the Wisconsin State Assembly.

=== Saukville Fire Department ===
Saukville's paid, on-call volunteer fire department operates one fire station on Dekora Street. Jason Laabs serves as the assistant fire chief.

=== Saukville Police Department ===
Saukville's police department employs ten sworn officers in addition to Police Chief Robert Meyer and two civilian administrators. The department operates one police station on Green Bay Road.

== Education ==
Saukville is served by the joint Port Washington-Saukville School District. Students attend Saukville Elementary School for kindergarten through fourth grade, Thomas Jefferson Middle School for fifth through eighth grades, and Port Washington High School for ninth through twelfth grades.

The district is governed by a nine-member elected school board, which meets on Mondays at 6 p.m. in the District Office Board Room, 100 W. Monroe Street, Port Washington. The district also has a full-time superintendent: Michael R. Weber.

The University of Wisconsin–Milwaukee Field Station is a 320-acre nature preserve and laboratory adjacent to the Cedarburg Bog State Natural Area, west of the village. The field station grounds and laboratories are not open to the general public, but are used by university students and faculty to conduct biological and ecological research.

== Transportation ==
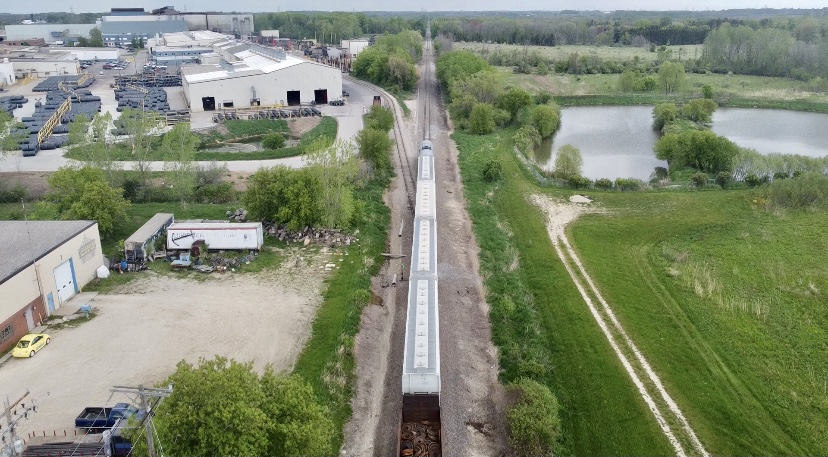
The Canadian National Railway picks up cars laden with steel products at the Charter Steel plant.

Interstate 43 passes through eastern Saukville with access via Exit 96. The junction of Interstate 43 and Wisconsin Highway 57 is located at the village's northeastern municipal boundary.

Saukville has limited public transit compared with larger cities. Ozaukee County and the Milwaukee County Transit System run the Route 143 commuter bus, also known as the "Ozaukee County Express," to Milwaukee via Interstate 43. The bus stops in the Saukville Walmart parking lot, near I-43 Exit 96. The stop is the route's northern terminus. The bus operates Monday through Friday with limited hours corresponding to peak commute times. Ozaukee County Transit Services' Shared Ride Taxi is the public transit option for traveling to sites not directly accessible from the interstate. The taxis operate seven days a week and make connections to Washington County Transit and Milwaukee County Routes 12, 49 and 42u.

One freight rail line passes through the village. Heading south from Saukville, the line is operated by the Wisconsin Central Ltd. railroad, a subsidiary of the Canadian National Railway. Heading north from Saukville, the Wisconsin and Southern Railroad operates the line. The village currently does not have a passenger train station.

== Parks and recreation ==
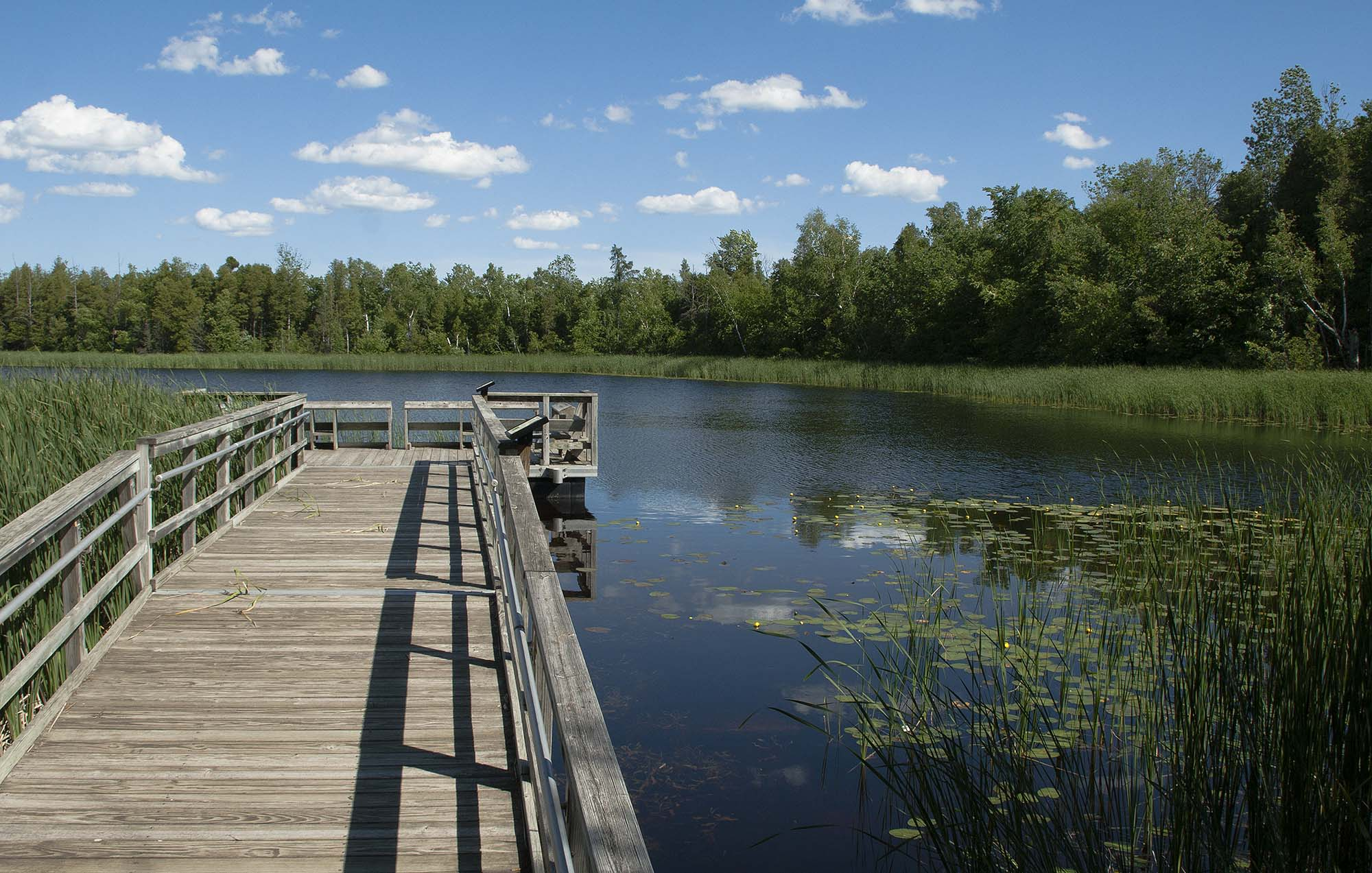
The boardwalk at the Cedarburg Bog extends into Mud Lake and provides opportunities for birdwatching.

The Village of Saukville maintains eight municipal parks with baseball and softball fields; basketball, tennis, and volleyball courts; football and soccer fields playgrounds; picnic shelters; and access to the Milwaukee River for fishing and canoeing. The village also facilitates youth baseball and softball leagues.

Additionally, the surrounding Town of Saukville is home to five Ozaukee County Parks on the Milwaukee River, comprising over 200 acres of parkland and including the H. H. Peters Youth Camp and the Ozaukee County Pioneer Village, an open-air museum that preserves twenty-four historic buildings from the 1840s through the early 1900s. The town is also home to four Wisconsin State Natural Areas, including the 2,200-acre Cedarburg Bog, a National Natural Landmark that is the largest and best preserved bog in eastern Wisconsin, and has hiking trails and boardwalks. There are over a dozen publicly and privately owned bogs in the Saukville area that are home to biodiverse ecosystems that are rare in other parts of Wisconsin.

The private, nonprofit Riveredge Nature Center is located at another Wisconsin State Natural Area. The center's 61-acre property includes glacial landforms and diverse wildlife, and the center conducts educational programs throughout the year. The Blue Heron Wildlife Sanctuary is also a private, nonprofit nature center with 92-acres of land. Located north of the village, the sanctuary has hiking trails and wildlife rehabilitation facilities.

The Saukville area has several golf courses. Ozaukee County maintains the public, 18-hole Hawthorne Hills Golf Course adjacent to Hawthorne Hills County Park. The Bog is a private, 18-hole Arnold Palmer Signature Design golf course located east of the Cedarburg Bog in the Town of Saukville.

== Notable people ==
- Robert Brooks, Wisconsin State Representative and businessman
- Tom Uttech, artist
