= Port Washington (town), Wisconsin =

Town in Ozaukee County, Wisconsin

Town of Port Washington, Wisconsin
- Town
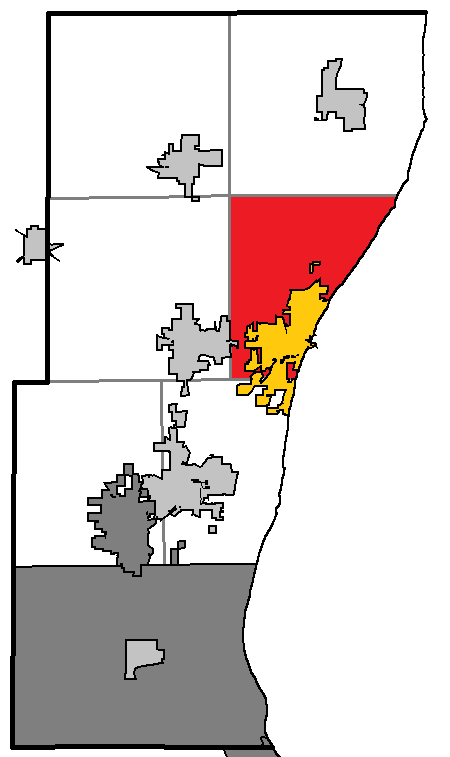
- Location of the Town of Port Washington, within Ozaukee County, Wisconsin.
- Coordinates: 43°25′36″N 87°52′48″W
- Country: United States
- State: Wisconsin
- County: Ozaukee
- Settled: 1835; 191 years ago
- Incorporated: January 1846; 180 years ago

Government
  - Town Chairman: Mike Didier
  - Clerk: Heather Krueger
  - Treasurer: Mary Sampont
  - Board of supervisors: Supervisors: Greg Welton; Gary Schlenvogt

Area
  - Total: 17.8 sq mi (46.1 km^{2})
  - Land: 17.8 sq mi (46.1 km^{2})
  - Water: 0 sq mi (0.0 km^{2})
- Elevation: 758 ft (231 m)

Population (2020)
  - Total: 1,538
  - Density: 87/sq mi (33.4/km^{2})
- Time zone: UTC-6 (Central (CST))
  - Summer (DST): UTC-5 (CDT)
- Area code: 262
- Website: townofportwashingtonwi.gov

Port Washington is a town in Ozaukee County in the U.S. state of Wisconsin. It surrounds the northern and western side of the city of Port Washington. As of the 2020 census, the town population was 1,538. The unincorporated communities of Druecker and Knellsville are also located in the town.

== History ==
The area that became Port Washington was originally inhabited by the Menominee, Potawatomi, and Sauk Native Americans. The 1830s saw the forced removal of Wisconsin's Native American population, followed by land speculation by merchants and investors. One of these land speculators was General Wooster Harrison, who purchased the land that would become the Town of Port Washington in 1835. Harrison's wife, Rhoda, died in 1837 and was the first white settler to be buried in the town. The settlement was abandoned that same year.

In 1843, Harrison returned with a party of settlers. The Town of Port Washington was formed in January 1846 and until 1847 included the surrounding areas of what is currently Fredonia, Saukville, and Belgium. At the time, the land was part of Washington County, and in the late 1840s, Port Washington was a candidate for the county seat. However, the community was far from the county's other early settlements, including Mequon, Grafton and Germantown. In 1850, the Wisconsin legislature voted to bisected Washington County into northern and southern counties, with Port Washington and Cedarburg as the county seats, respectively. County residents failed to ratify the bill, and in 1853 the legislature instead bisected the county into eastern and western sections, creating Ozaukee County. Port Washington became the seat of the new county, and the Washington County seat moved to West Bend. The bisection was controversial. When Washington County officials from West Bend arrived in Port Washington to correct relevant county records, they were run out of town, and Ozaukee County officials refused to hand over the records for several months.

The town population reached 2,500 in 1853 and continued to increase, with an influx of immigrants from Germany and Luxembourg between 1853 and 1865.

In the 1860s, William Knell developed the Knellsville community in the northern part of the town as a stagecoach stop on the Green Bay Road. In the 1870s, dairy farming became increasingly popular among Port Washington's farmers, and the Pauly Cheese Factory opened in Knellsville in 1878. In the 20th century, Pauly's Cheese became a nationally distributed brand. Knellsville grew to serve the town's farmers with a feed mill, a cannery, and a foundry.

The City of Port Washington incorporated out of some of the town's land in 1882.

While dairy farming dominated the local economy in the 20th century, accounting for 80% percent of agriculture in the early 1940s, the Town of Port Washington was also one of several Ozaukee County communities to have prosperous fur farms in the 20th century. The 10-acre Johannes Mink Ranch north of Knellsville opened in 1926, and annually produced 6,000 mink pelts at its height.

Knellsville declined in the mid-20th century for several reasons. The Knellsville Canning Co. closed in 1955, and the Johannes Mink Ranch sold its last pelts in 1969. Additionally, as the City of Port Washington grew and suburbanized, annexing more land from the town, demand for access to the Interstate Highway System grew. Knellsville was close to the city outskirts, and in the mid-1960s, the southern part of Knellsville was demolished to construct Interstate 43's Exit 100.

== Geography ==
According to the United States Census Bureau, the town has a total area of 21.1 square miles (55 km^{2}), of which 18.6 square miles (48 km^{2}) is land and 2.5 square miles (6.5 km^{2}) (11.63%) is water. The City of Port Washington is located in what was formerly the southeastern part of the town. The Town of Port Washington is bordered by the Town of Belgium to the north, Lake Michigan to the east, the Town of Grafton to the south, and the Town of Saukville and Village of Saukville to the west. The unincorporated communities of Druecker and Knellsville are located in the town.

The town is located on the western shore of Lake Michigan. The coastline is characterized by clay bluffs ranging from 80 to 130 feet (24 to 40 meters) in height with deep ravines where streams flow into the lake. Clay bluffs are a geological formation characteristic of the Lake Michigan shoreline and are found in few other areas of the world. Much of the coastline adjacent to the bluffs has mixed gravel and sand beaches. There are valleys lower than the surrounding bluffs in the City of Port Washington's historic downtown where Sauk Creek flows into the lake and in the Town of Port Washington where Sucker Creek flows into the lake.

The town is located in the Southeastern Wisconsin glacial till plains that were created by the Wisconsin glaciation during the most recent ice age. The soil is clayey glacial till with a thin layer of loess on the surface. The Wisconsin Department of Natural Resources considers the town to be in the Central Lake Michigan Coastal ecological landscape.

Before white settlers arrived in the area, the Port Washington area was an upland forest dominated by American beech and sugar maple trees. There were also white cedars growing in the lowlands along the streams. Early surveyors also noted swamps in the area containing birch, ash, elm, oak, and sugar bush. Much of the original forest was cleared to prepare the land for agriculture.

As land development continues to reduce wild areas, wildlife is forced into closer proximity with human communities like Port Washington. Large mammals, including white-tailed deer, coyotes, and red foxes can be seen in the town. There have been infrequent sightings of black bears in Ozaukee County communities, including a 2010 sighting of a bear in a City of Port Washington residential neighborhood.

The region struggles with many invasive species, including the emerald ash borer, common carp, reed canary grass, the common reed, purple loosestrife, garlic mustard, Eurasian buckthorns, and honeysuckles.

== Demographics ==
As of the census of 2000, there were 1,631 people, 636 households, and 447 families residing in the town. The population density was 87.7 people per square mile (33.9/km^{2}). There were 678 housing units at an average density of 36.4 per square mile (14.1/km^{2}). The racial makeup of the town was 97.30% White, 1.10% Black or African American, 0.43% Asian, 0.25% Native American, 0.06% Pacific Islander, 0.31% from other races, and 0.55% from two or more races. 0.61% of the population were Hispanic or Latino of any race.

There were 636 households, out of which 32.4% had children under the age of 18 living with them, 62.6% were married couples living together, 4.6% had a female householder with no husband present, and 29.7% were non-families. 26.6% of all households were made up of individuals, and 16.8% had someone living alone who was 65 years of age or older. The average household size was 2.56 and the average family size was 3.11.

In the town, the population was spread out, with 26.3% under the age of 18, 6.1% from 18 to 24, 28.1% from 25 to 44, 23.7% from 45 to 64, and 15.8% who were 65 years of age or older. The median age was 40 years. For every 100 females, there were 97.0 males. For every 100 females age 18 and over, there were 93.9 males.

The median income for a household in the town was $56,875, and the median income for a family was $62,765. Males had a median income of $41,742 versus $25,645 for females. The per capita income for the town was $22,781. About 2.3% of families and 3.2% of the population were below the poverty line, including 2.6% of those under age 18 and none of those age 65 or over.

== Law and government ==
Port Washington is organized as a town governed by an elected board, comprising a chairman and two supervisors. The current chairman is Mike Didier. The board meets on the first Monday of each month at 7:30 p.m. in the town hall which is located at 3715 Highland Drive in the unincorporated Knellsville community.

As part of Wisconsin's 6th congressional district, Port Washington is represented by Glenn Grothman (R) in the United States House of Representatives, and by Ron Johnson (R) and Tammy Baldwin (D) in the United States Senate. Duey Stroebel (R) represents Port Washington in the Wisconsin State Senate, and Robert Brooks (R) represents Port Washington in the Wisconsin State Assembly.

== Education ==
Port Washington is served by the joint Port Washington-Saukville School District. The district has three elementary schools for kindergarten through fourth grade. Students in the northern and eastern parts of the town attend Lincoln Elementary. Saukville Elementary serves students in the western parts of the Town of Port Washington and the Town and Village of Saukville. Students in the far southern parts of the town attend Dunwiddie Elementary. All students in the district attend Thomas Jefferson Middle School for fifth through eighth grades, and Port Washington High School for ninth through twelfth grades.

The district is governed by a nine-member elected school board, which meets on Mondays at 6 p.m. in the District Office Board Room, 100 W. Monroe Street, Port Washington. The district also has a full-time superintendent: Michael R. Weber.

== Transportation ==
Interstate 43 passes through the town with access to Knellsville and the City of Port Washington via Exit 100. A small stretch of Wisconsin Highway 33 passes through the southwestern part of the town between the City of Port Washington and the Village of Saukville.

Port Washington has limited public transit compared with larger cities. Ozaukee County and the Milwaukee County Transit System run the Route 143 commuter bus, also known as the "Ozaukee County Express," to Milwaukee via Interstate 43. The closest stop is the route's northern terminus at the Saukville Walmart parking lot, near Interstate 43 Exit 96. The bus operates Monday through Friday with limited hours corresponding to peak commute times. Ozaukee County Transit Services' Shared Ride Taxi is the public transit option for traveling to sites not directly accessible from the interstate. The taxis operate seven days a week and make connections to Washington County Transit and Milwaukee County Routes 12, 49 and 42u. Unlike a typical taxi, however, the rider must contact the service ahead of time to schedule their pick-up date and time. The taxi service plans their routes based on the number of riders, pick-up/drop-off time and destination then plans the routes accordingly.

The town does not have sidewalks in many areas, but the Ozaukee Interurban Trail for pedestrian and bicycle use runs north–south through the town and connects Port Washington to the neighboring communities of Grafton in the south and Belgium in the north. The trail continues north to Oostburg in Sheboygan County and south to Brown Deer where it connects with the Oak Leaf Trail. The trail was formerly an interurban passenger rail line that ran from Milwaukee to Sheboygan with a stop in the City of Port Washington, which was the halfway point between the northern and southern terminuses. The train was in operation from 1907 to 1948, when it fell into disuse following World War II. The old rail line was converted into the present recreational trail in the 1990s.

The town does not have passenger rail service, but the Union Pacific Railroad operates freight trains in the community.
