= Knellsville, Wisconsin =

Unincorporated community in Ozaukee County, Wisconsin

- Unincorporated community
- Location within Wisconsin Location within the United States
- Coordinates: 43°24′51″N 87°52′15″W
- Country: United States
- State: Wisconsin
- County: Ozaukee
- Elevation: 735 ft (224 m)
- Time zone: UTC-6 (Central (CST))
  - Summer (DST): UTC-5 (CDT)
- Postal code: 53074
- Area code: 262
- GNIS feature ID: 1567569

Knellsville is an unincorporated community in the Town of Port Washington, Ozaukee County, Wisconsin, United States. Located in the Milwaukee Metropolitan Area on the north side of the intersection of Interstate 43 and Wisconsin Highway 32, Knellsville borders the City of Port Washington's northern municipal limit. The Port Washington Town Hall is in Knellsville, but the City of Port Washington provides sewerage and water services for the community.

== History ==
Knellsville is named for William Knell, who settled in the area in the early 1860s and developed the community as a stagecoach stop in the Green Bay Road. The community grew to support the farmers in the rural Town of Port Washington.

In the 1870s, dairy farming became increasingly popular among Wisconsin's farmers, and when Port Washington's farms followed the trend the Pauly Cheese Factory opened in Knellsville in 1878 to process local milk. In the 20th century, Pauly's Cheese became a nationally distributed brand. Knellsville grew to serve the town's farmers with stores, restaurants, a feed mill, and a foundry. The Knellsville Canning Company opened in 1910 to process local crops, including spinach and beets.

While dairy farming dominated the local economy in the 20th century, accounting for 80% percent of agriculture in the early 1940s, the Town of Port Washington was also one of several Ozaukee County communities to have prosperous fur farms in the 20th century. The 10-acre Johannes Mink Ranch north of Knellsville opened in 1926, and annually produced 6,000 mink pelts at its height.

Knellsville declined after World War II. The Knellsville Canning Co. closed in 1955, and the Johannes Mink Ranch sold its last pelts in 1969. Additionally, as the City of Port Washington grew and suburbanized, annexing more land from the town, demand for access to the Interstate Highway System grew. Knellsville was close to the city outskirts, and in the mid-1960s, the southern part of Knellsville was demolished to construct Interstate 43.

In 2006, the Town of Port Washington developed a detailed plan to allow for increased development in Knellsville. The town designated 109 acres (0.44 km^{2}) for industrial facilities, 30 acres (120,000 m^{2}) for office buildings, and 44 acres (180,000 m^{2}) for commercial buildings. Due to this plan, Knellsville is unique among unincorporated communities in that the town in which it lies has given it a defined border.

== Geography ==
Knellsville's western border lies along the Union Pacific railroad tracks, which run parallel to Sauk Creek. The eastern border is the Ozaukee Interurban Trail, and the southern border is Interstate 43. The northern border extends east-west along County Road KW.

The City of Port Washington also refers to one of its neighborhoods as Knellsville; as of 2009, this part of the city was still undeveloped farm land.
