= Druecker, Wisconsin =

Unincorporated community in Ozaukee County, Wisconsin

- Unincorporated community
- Location within Wisconsin Location within the United States
- Coordinates: 43°26′24″N 87°52′16″W
- Country: United States
- State: Wisconsin
- County: Ozaukee
- Elevation: 774 ft (236 m)
- Time zone: UTC-6 (Central (CST))
  - Summer (DST): UTC-5 (CDT)
- Area code: 262
- GNIS feature ID: 1567569

Druecker is an unincorporated community in the Town of Port Washington, Ozaukee County, Wisconsin, United States. The community is located on the east bank of Sauk Creek, and the Union Pacific railroad operates tracks passing through Druecker.

== History ==
The community is named for William Druecker, who opened the Druecker Stone Quarry in the area in 1873. The company was one of several limestone quarries that operated in Ozaukee County in the late 1800s and early 1900, and quarrying was Druecker's main economic activity from the 1870s until the 1920s. The quarry produced stone for Port Washington buildings, including St. Mary's Roman Catholic Church, and also operated lime kilns and a railway depot referred to as "Limekiln Station" on the Lake Shore Railway, which later became part of the Chicago and North Western Railway. A post office opened in Druecker in 1886.

Limestone declined in popularity for construction in the 1920s and some of Ozaukee County's quarries closed. The Lake Shore Stone Company in the Town of Belgium closed in 1925, and the Milwaukee Falls Lime Company in the Village of Grafton closed in 1926. The Druecker Stone Quarry also closed in the 1920s, and the community's post office ceased operations in 1928.
