= Payne Hotel =

- U.S. National Register of Historic Places
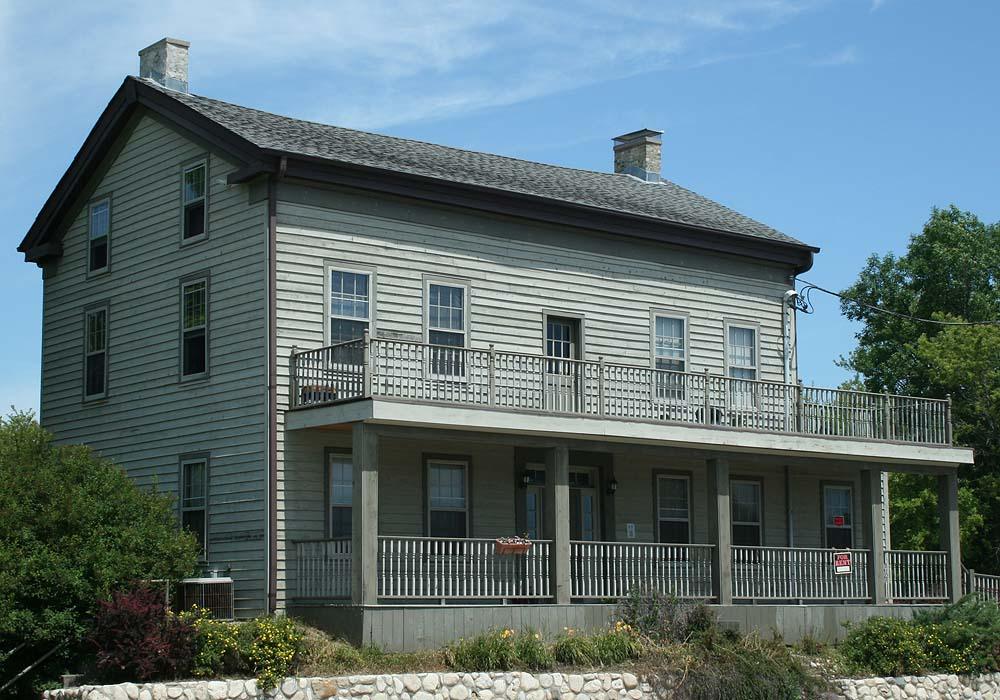
- Front and side

- Location within Wisconsin Location within the United States
- Location: 310 E. Green Bay Ave., Saukville, Wisconsin
- Coordinates: 43°22′54″N 87°56′18″W
- Area: Less than 1 acre (0.40 ha)
- Built: 1848
- Architectural style: Greek Revival
- NRHP reference No.: 91000220
- Added to NRHP: March 14, 1991

The Payne Hotel is a former stagecoach inn located along Highway 33 in Saukville, Wisconsin. Deemed worthy of preservation, the hotel has been listed on the National Register of Historic Places since March 14, 1991.

William Payne was born in London in 1806 and immigrated to the U.S. in 1826. In 1846 he founded Saukville, building a sawmill and gristmill on the Milwaukee River. In 1848 he built the Payne Hotel where the old Dekorra Military Road met the old Green Bay Trail. It served as a stagecoach stop for people traveling between Chicago/Milwaukee and Green Bay.

The hotel is a 2.5-story wood-frame building. It is in Greek Revival style, with a low-pitched roof, cornice returns, and symmetric windows and chimneys. Along with serving travelers, it hosted dances for locals in the ballroom on the third floor. It may well have hosted local meetings too, since Payne served as a Town Supervisor, Commissioner of Highways, and Justice of the Peace.

== See also ==
- National Register of Historic Places listings in Ozaukee County, Wisconsin
