= Great Trail =

Historic footpath network in America

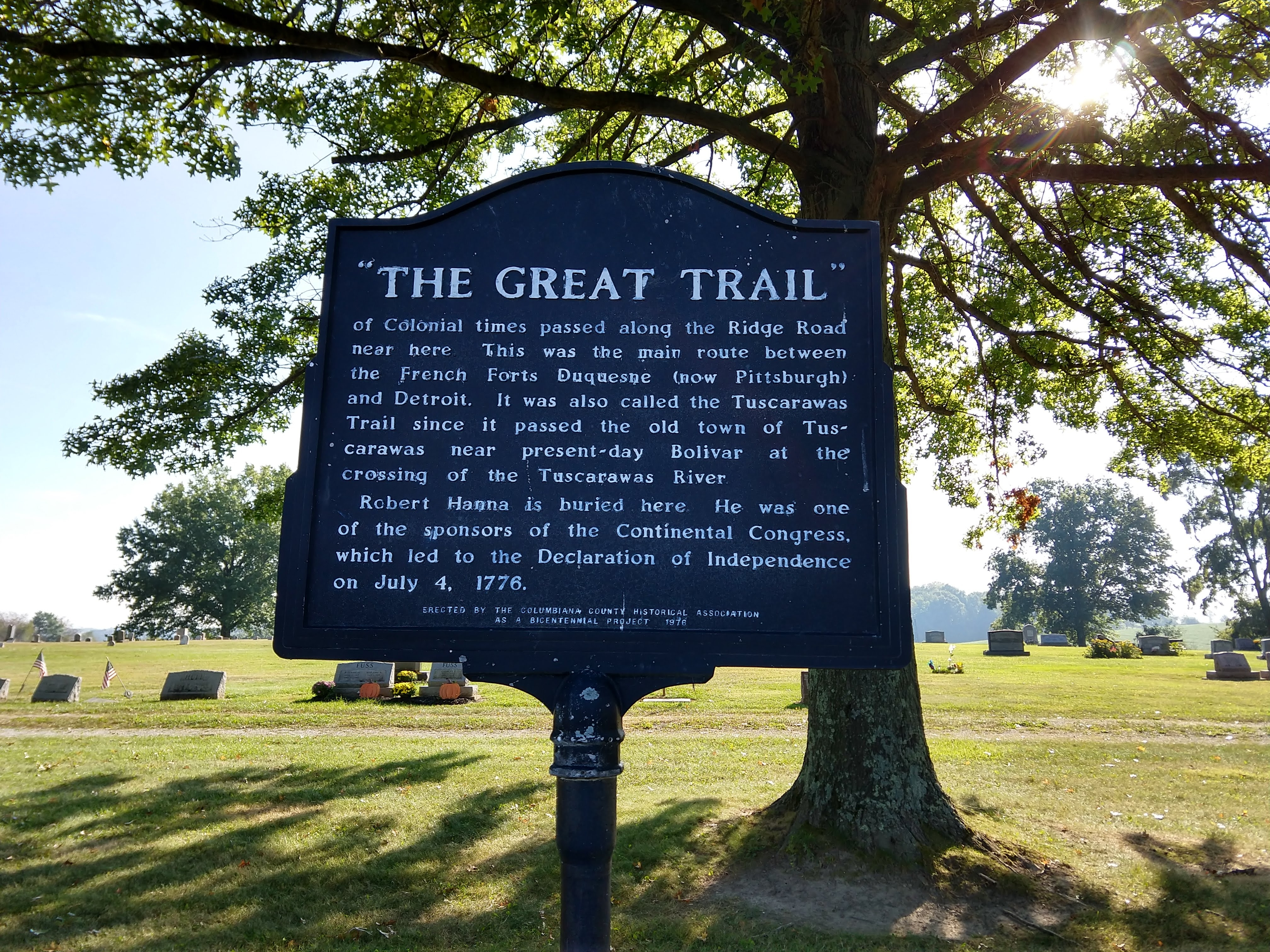
A historical marker along the trail in Ohio.

The Great Trail (also called the Great Path) was a network of footpaths created by Algonquian and Iroquoian-speaking indigenous peoples prior to the arrival of European colonists in North America. It connected the areas of New England and eastern Canada, and the mid-Atlantic regions to each other and to the Great Lakes region. Many major highways in the Northeastern United States were later constructed to follow the routes established thousands of years ago by Native Americans moving along these trails.

Although some sections of the trail have been called "warpaths", such as the so-called "Great Indian Warpath" through Chillicothe, Ohio, the primary purposes for these roads was peaceful trade, hunting, and gathering of natural resources along their routes. Some sources describe the Great Trail as beginning at one point or another. However, as there was a gradation between local trails used by few people and more major routes used by many, identifying a point at which the Great Trail begins or ends is an arbitrary matter. The Great Trail system connected with the Overland Trail, which led west, as well as other trails to other parts of the continent.

One part of the Great Trail system stretched from Passamaquoddy territory in northernmost New England through the Lakes Region of New Hampshire and down to the Shawmut Peninsula in Massachusetts. From there it connected to the region of the Wampanoag of Cape Cod, and over to the territory of the Nipmuck and other tribes around Lake Chaubunagungamaug before connecting to areas of present-day Connecticut and points farther south.

Another part of the Great Trail system in New England was later followed by Massachusetts Route 2; it leads from Boston to upstate New York. The section now known as the Mohawk Trail (used by tribes such as the Mohawk and Pocomtuc) leads from the Connecticut River valley through the Berkshires and Mohawk Trail State Forest into the area of present-day Albany, New York, the state capital. From here, the Great Trail system connected all parts of the territories where the Five Nations of the Haudenosaunee Confederacy lived.

In northern New Jersey, the portion of the Great Trail much-used by the Lenape included choice places to cross the Passaic River and to pass through the valleys among the Watchung Mountains, notably at Hobart Gap. As the Dutch colonists advanced beyond the proximity of the Hudson River, the new settlers found these paths crucial to their movement. New Jersey Route 24 generally follows a branch of the trail in this area.

A more southern part of the Great Trail system went from Delaware across Pennsylvania to Oldtown, Maryland, and then to the Ohio River below present-day Pittsburgh. It crossed Columbiana County to Bolivar and Sandusky, and continued west. The part of the Great Trail used by Colonial American troops during Pontiac's Rebellion has been improved as U.S. Route 23.

As with the Native Americans' burning underbrush to clear land for cultivating crops and creating deer fields, the Great Trail shows that the indigenous inhabitants traveled widely on the land, altering it to serve their needs. These parts of North America were not an "untouched wilderness," as described by the early colonists.

== Bibliography ==
- Ayres, Harral, The Great Trail of New England. Boston, MA: Meader Publishing Co. (1940)
