= Cedarburg Bog =

Bog and State Natural Area in Ozaukee County, Wisconsin

- Location within Wisconsin
- Location: Ozaukee County, Wisconsin, Wisconsin
- Coordinates: 43°23′14″N 88°00′27″W
- Area: 2,200 acres (890 ha)

U.S. National Natural Landmark
- Designated: 1973

Cedarburg Bog is a bog located in Ozaukee County, Wisconsin owned by the Wisconsin Department of Natural Resources and the University of Wisconsin–Milwaukee. It is the largest intact wetland complex in southeastern Wisconsin. The bog is a refuge and habitat for several species of plantlife and wildlife. It was designated a Wisconsin State Natural Area in 1952 and a National Natural Landmark in 1973. Additionally, it is part of the National Experimental Ecological Reserve Network.

== Photos ==
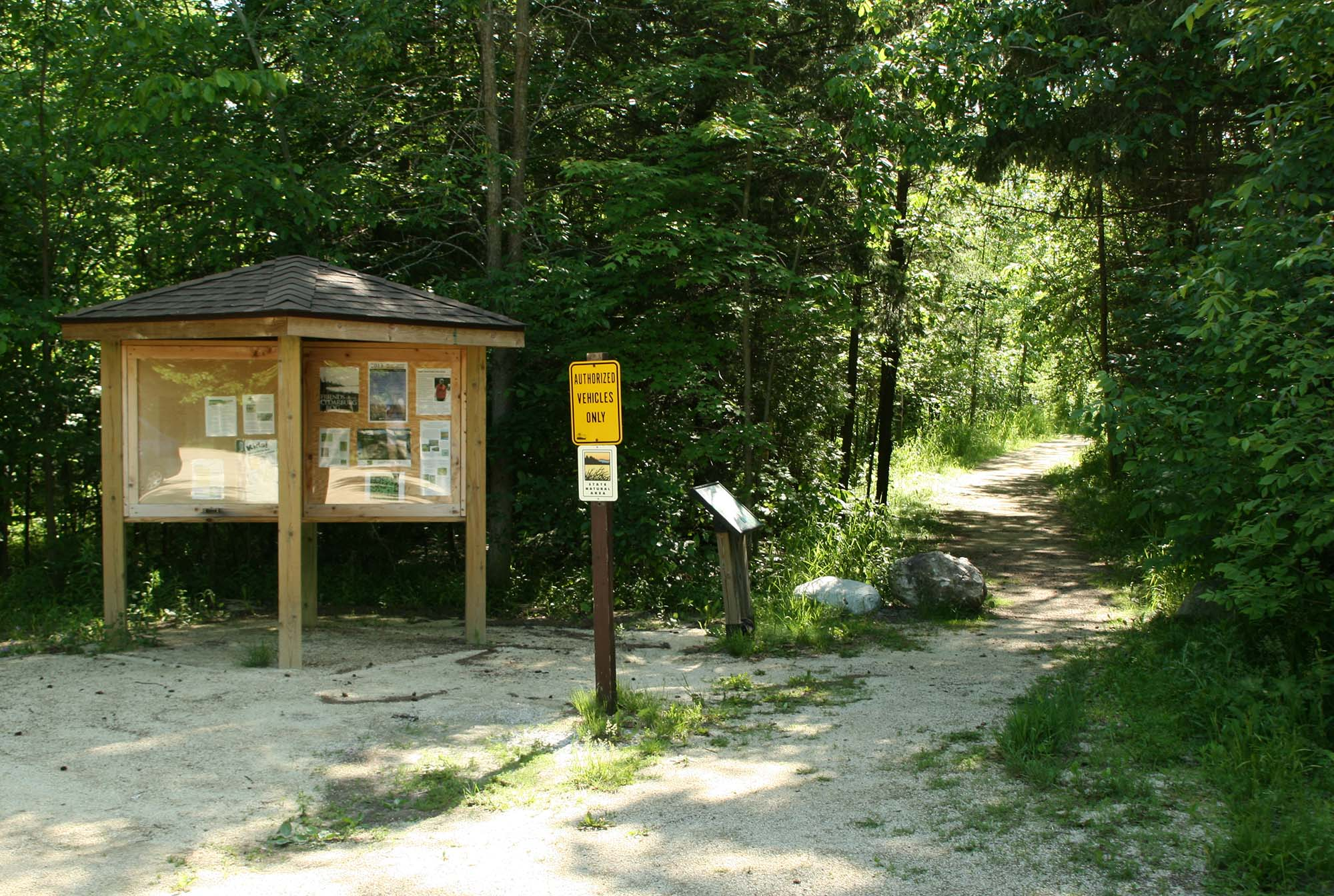
Trailhead information boards

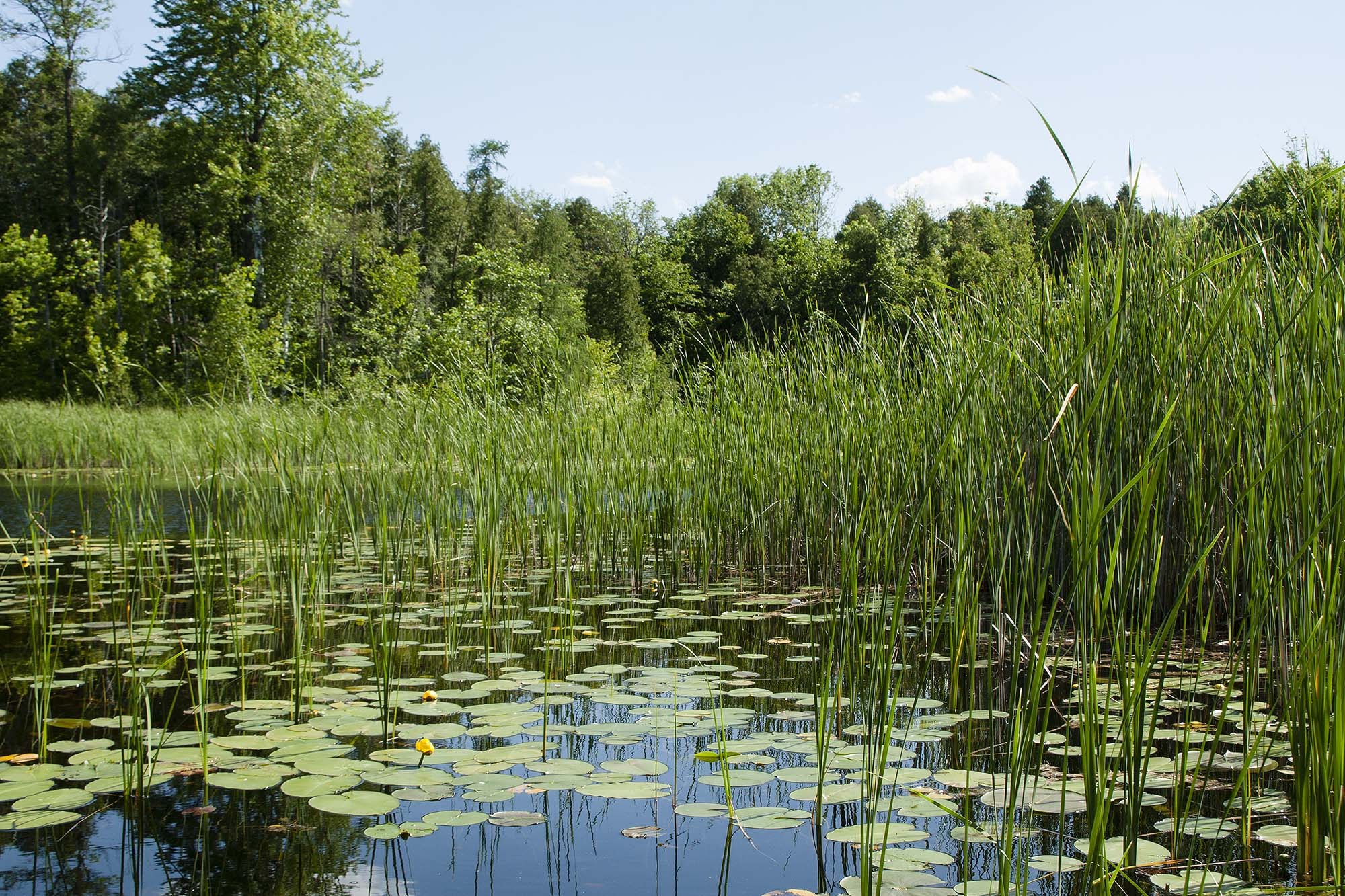
Lake at the end of the trail

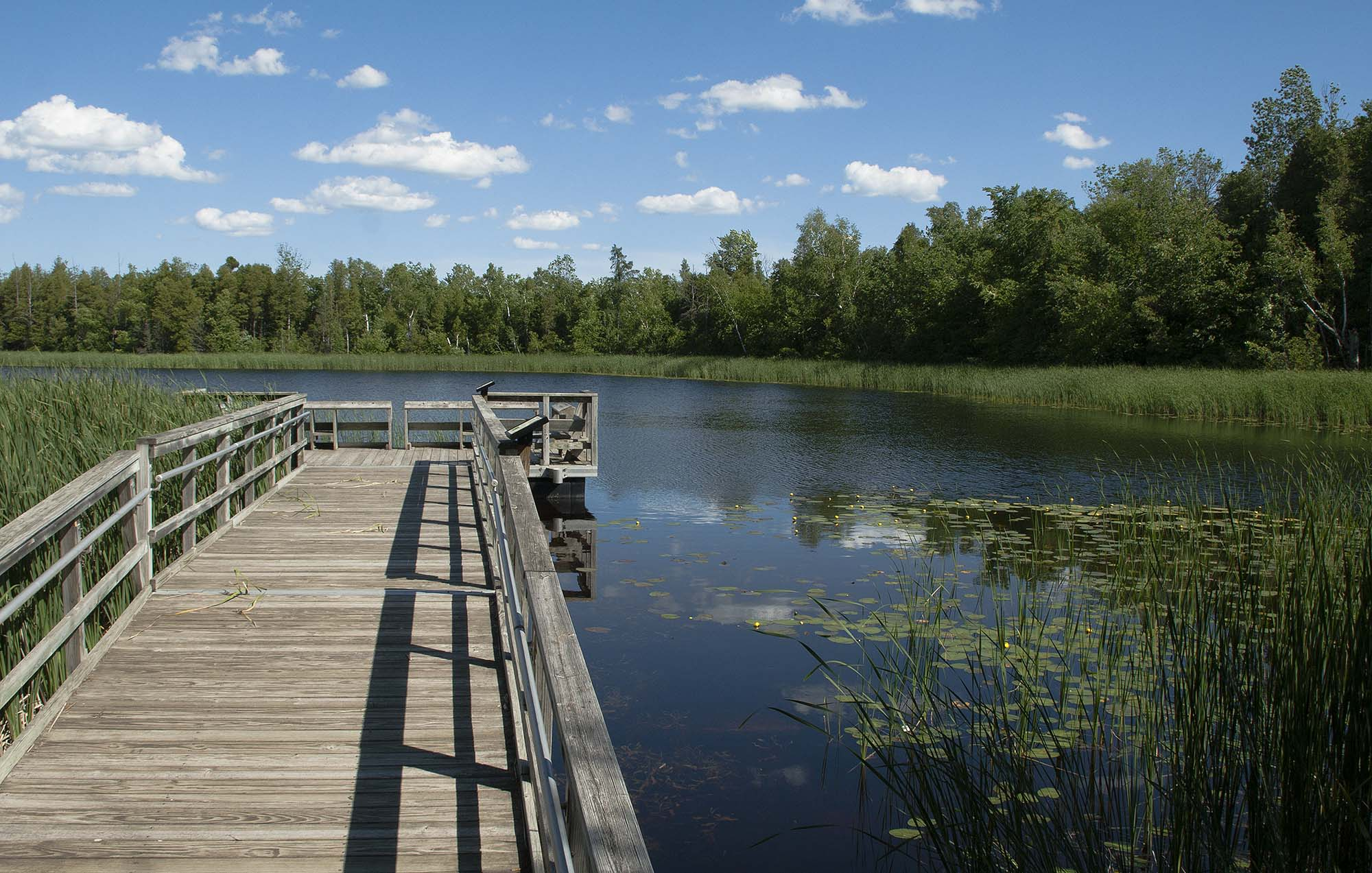
Pier on the lake
