= Port Washington-Saukville School District =

School district in Wisconsin, United States

Port Washington-Saukville School District (PWSSD) is a school district headquartered in Port Washington, Wisconsin. It serves that community and Saukville.

Prior to 2013 the school building served as polling sites. This was scrapped for security reasons.

Secondary schools:

- Port Washington High School
- Thomas Jefferson Middle School

Elementary schools:

- Dunwiddie Elementary School
- Lincoln Elementary School
  - As of 2023 Jane Gennerman is the principal.
- Saukville Elementary School
