= List of Michigan islands in Lake Huron =

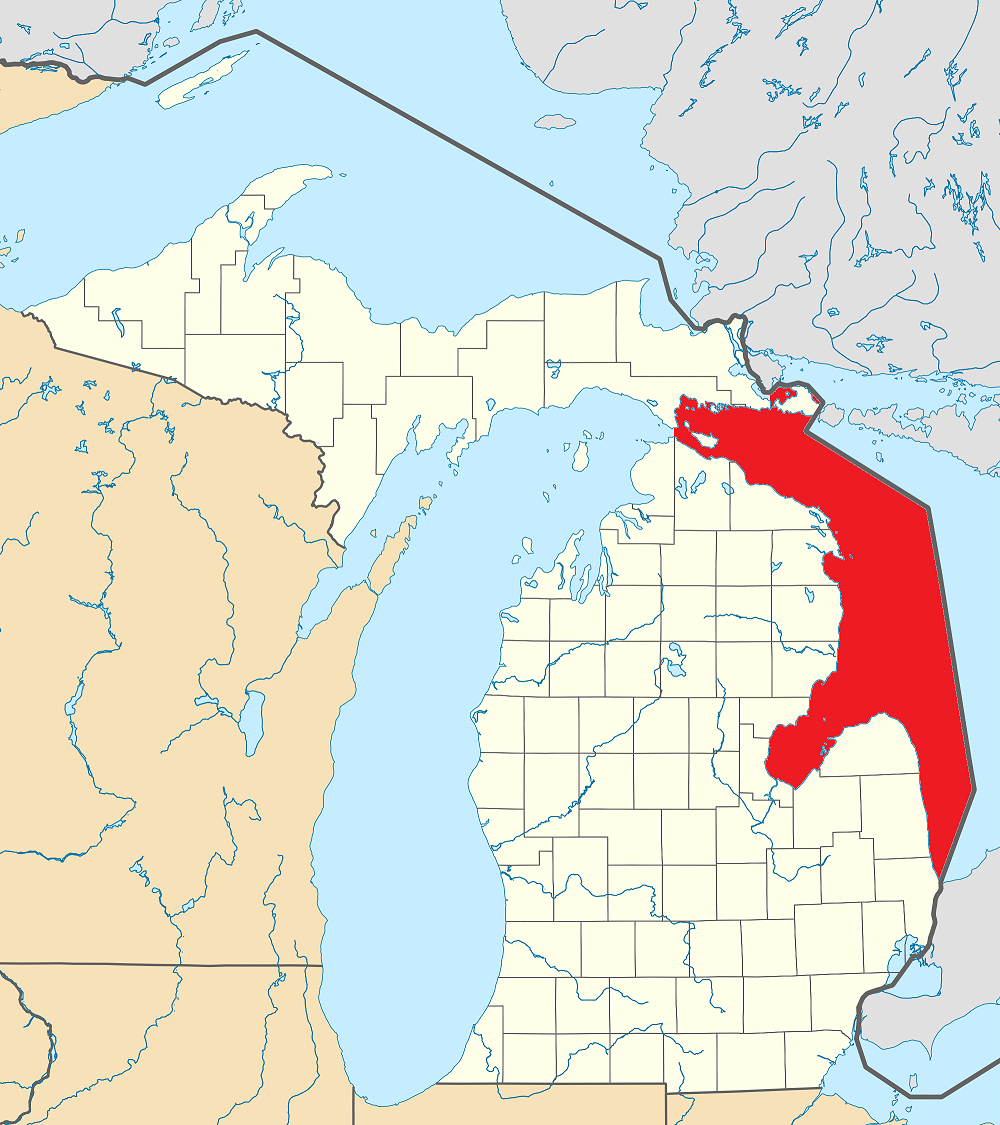
Image of Lake Huron highlighting the sector belonging to the state of Michigan

The following is a list of Michigan islands in Lake Huron. Lake Huron is the second largest of the Great Lakes (after Lake Superior). With a surface area of 23,010 mi^{2} (59,596 km^{2}), it ranks as the third largest fresh water lake in the world. Michigan is the only U.S. state to border Lake Huron, while the portion of the lake on the other side of the international border belongs to the Canadian province of Ontario. For the islands belonging to Ontario, see the List of Ontario islands in Lake Huron. This article also does not include islands that are part of the St. Marys River.

The vast majority of Michigan's islands in Lake Huron are centered on Drummond Island in the northernmost portion of the state's lake territory. Drummond Island is the largest of Michigan's islands in Lake Huron and is the second largest Michigan island after Lake Superior's Isle Royale. Another large group of islands is the Les Cheneaux Islands archipelago, which itself contains dozens of small islands. Many of the lake's islands are very small and uninhabited.

As the most popular tourist destination in the state, Mackinac Island is the most well known of Lake Huron's islands. Drummond Island is the most populous of Michigan's islands in Lake Huron, with a population of 973 at the 2020 census. While Mackinac Island had a population of only 583, there are thousands more seasonal workers and tourists during the summer months.

Island	Municipality	County	Coordinates
Adelaide Island	Drummond Township	Chippewa	
Albany Island	Detour Township	Chippewa	
Andrews Island	Drummond Township	Chippewa	
Arrow Island	Drummond Township	Chippewa	
Ashman Island	Drummond Township	Chippewa	
Bacon Island	Drummond Township	Chippewa	
Bald Island	Drummond Township	Chippewa	
Bay Island	Drummond Township	Chippewa	
Bear Island	Clark Township	Mackinac	
Bellevue Island	Drummond Township	Chippewa	
Big St. Martin Island	St. Ignace Township	Mackinac	
Big Trout Island	Drummond Township	Chippewa	
Birch Island	Clark Township	Mackinac	
Bird Island	Drummond Township	Chippewa	
Bird Island	Sanborn Township	Alpena	
Black River Island	Alcona Township	Alcona	
Bois Blanc Island	Bois Blanc Township	Mackinac	
Boot Island	Clark Township	Mackinac	
Bootjack Island	Drummond Township	Chippewa	
Boulanger Island	Drummond Township	Chippewa	
Bow Island	Drummond Township	Chippewa	
Burnham Island	Clark Township	Mackinac	
Burnt Island	Drummond Township	Chippewa	
Butterfield Island	Drummond Township	Chippewa	
Cass Island	Drummond Township	Chippewa	
Cedar Island	Drummond Township	Chippewa	
Channel Island	Hampton Township	Bay	
Charity Island	Sims Township	Arenac	
Cherry Island	Drummond Township	Chippewa	
Clark Island	Drummond Township	Chippewa	
Claw Island	Drummond Township	Chippewa	
Coryell Island	Clark Township	Mackinac	
Cove Island	Drummond Township	Chippewa	
Cove Island	Clark Township	Mackinac	
Crab Island	Drummond Township	Chippewa	
Crooked Island	Alpena Township	Alpena	
Crow Island	Detour Township	Chippewa	
Crow Island	Clark Township	Mackinac	
Defoe Island	Fairhaven Township	Huron	
Dollar Island	Clark Township	Mackinac	
Drummond Island	Drummond Township	Chippewa	
Duck Island	Fairhaven Township	Huron	
Dudley Island	Clark Township	Mackinac	
Eagle Island	Clark Township	Mackinac	
Echo Island	Clark Township	Mackinac	
Espanore Island	Drummond Township	Chippewa	
False Presque Isle	Presque Isle Township	Presque Isle	
Fairbank Island	Drummond Township	Chippewa	
Fire Island	Drummond Township	Chippewa	
Frying Pan Island	Detour Township	Chippewa	
Garden Island	Drummond Township	Chippewa	
Goat Island	Clark Township	Mackinac	
Goose Island	Clark Township	Mackinac	
Government Island	Clark Township	Mackinac	
Grape Island	Drummond Township	Chippewa	
Grass Island	Alpena Township	Alpena	
Gravel Island	Drummond Township	Chippewa	
Gravelly Island	Clark Township	Mackinac	
Gull Island	Drummond Township	Chippewa	
Gull Island	Sims Township	Arenac	
Gull Island	Alpena Township	Alpena	
Gull Island	Bangor Township	Bay	
Gull Island	Bois Blanc Township	Mackinac	
Harbor Island	Drummond Township	Chippewa	
Harris Island	Drummond Township	Chippewa	
Haven Island	Clark Township	Mackinac	
Heisterman Island	Fairhaven Township	Huron	
Hill Island	Clark Township	Mackinac	
Holsinger Island	Clark Township	Mackinac	
Howard Island	Drummond Township	Chippewa	
Island Number Eight	Clark Township	Mackinac	
James Island	Drummond Township	Chippewa	
Jim Island	Drummond Township	Chippewa	
Jones Island	Drummond Township	Chippewa	
La Pointe Island	Drummond Township	Chippewa	
La Salle Island	Clark Township	Mackinac	
Les Cheneaux Islands	Clark Township	Mackinac	
Little Cass Island	Drummond Township	Chippewa	
Little Charity Island	Sims Township	Arenac	
Little Island	Clark Township	Mackinac	
Little La Salle Island	Clark Township	Mackinac	
Little Rogg Island	Drummond Township	Chippewa	
Little St. Martin Island	Marquette Township	Mackinac	
Little Trout Island	Drummond Township	Chippewa	
Lone Susan Island	Clark Township	Mackinac	
Lone Tree Island	Fairhaven Township	Huron	
Long Island	Clark Township	Mackinac	
Long Island	Drummond Township	Chippewa	
Long Island	Drummond Township	Chippewa	
Mackinac Island	Mackinac Island	Mackinac	
Macomb Island	Drummond Township	Chippewa	
Maisou Island	Fairhaven Township	Huron	
Maple Island	Drummond Township	Chippewa	
Mare Island	Drummond Township	Chippewa	
Marquette Island	Clark Township	Mackinac	
Meade Island	Drummond Township	Chippewa	
Middle Grounds Island	Fairhaven Township	Huron	
Middle Island	Alpena Township	Alpena	
Norris Island	Drummond Township	Chippewa	
North Island	Fairhaven Township	Huron	
Orion Rock	Port Austin Township	Huron	
Peck Island	Drummond Township	Chippewa	
Penny Island	Clark Township	Mackinac	
Peters Island	Detour Township	Chippewa	
Picnic Island	Drummond Township	Chippewa	
Pipe Island Twins	Detour Township	Chippewa	
Pitchers Reef	Fairhaven Township	Huron	
Propeller Island	Drummond Township	Chippewa	
Quarry Island	Drummond Township	Chippewa	
Roger Island	Clark Township	Mackinac	
Rogg Island	Drummond Township	Chippewa	
Round Island	Alpena Township	Alpena	
Round Island	Mackinac Island	Mackinac	
Rover Island	Clark Township	Mackinac	
Rutland Island	Drummond Township	Chippewa	
Saddlebag Island	Detour Township	Chippewa	
St. Ledger Island	Clark Township	Mackinac	
St. Martin Island	St. Ignace Township	Mackinac	
Saltonstall Island	Drummond Township	Chippewa	
Sam Island	Drummond Township	Chippewa	
Scarecrow Island	Sanborn Township	Alpena	
Shelter Island	Drummond Township	Chippewa	
Silver Island	Drummond Township	Chippewa	
Snake Island	Bois Blanc Township	Mackinac	
Spence Island	Drummond Township	Chippewa	
Squaw Island	Drummond Township	Chippewa	
Standerson Island	Drummond Township	Chippewa	
Strawberry Island	Detour Township	Chippewa	
Strongs Island	Clark Township	Mackinac	
Sugar Island	Alpena Township	Alpena	
Sulphur Island	Alpena Township	Alpena	
Surgeon Island	Detour Township	Chippewa	
Surveyors Island	Drummond Township	Chippewa	
Sweets Island	Detour Township	Chippewa	
Thunder Bay Island	Alpena Township	Alpena	
Turnip Rock	Pointe Aux Barques Township	Huron	
Twin Sister Island	Drummond Township	Chippewa	
White Loon Island	Clark Township	Mackinac	
White Rock	Sherman Township	Huron	
Willoughby Island	Drummond Township	Chippewa	
Wilson Island	Drummond Township	Chippewa	
Wreck Island	Drummond Township	Chippewa	
Young Island	Drummond Township	Chippewa	

== See also ==
- Harbor Island National Wildlife Refuge
- List of islands of Michigan
- Michigan Islands National Wildlife Refuge
- Saginaw Bay
