= Sims Township =

Sims Township may refer to the following places in the United States:

- Sims Township, Grant County, Indiana
- Sims Township, Arenac County, Michigan
