= Les Cheneaux Antique Wooden Boat Show =

Boat show

The Les Cheneaux Antique Wooden Boat Show is held in the Upper Peninsula of Michigan in the city of Hessel, Michigan. Founded in 1978, the event is held every year during the second week of August. The event brings about 8,000 to 10,000 boaters and visitors each year from all over the United States coming together to appreciate antique boats. The boats featured in the event include dinghies, rowboats, canoes, launches, sailboats, utilities, runabouts and large cruisers. On average there are about 150 boat entries each year. Along with the boat show there is The Festival of Arts.

== History ==
The Les Cheneaux Antique Wooden Boat Show was founded in 1978. The boat show was started by the boat owners of Hessel wanting to show off their boats. Mertaugh Boat Works, which is in Hessel, had the first Chris-Craft franchise where the boats were bought for the island properties. Since then, it has grown to be the largest antique wooden boat show in the United States.

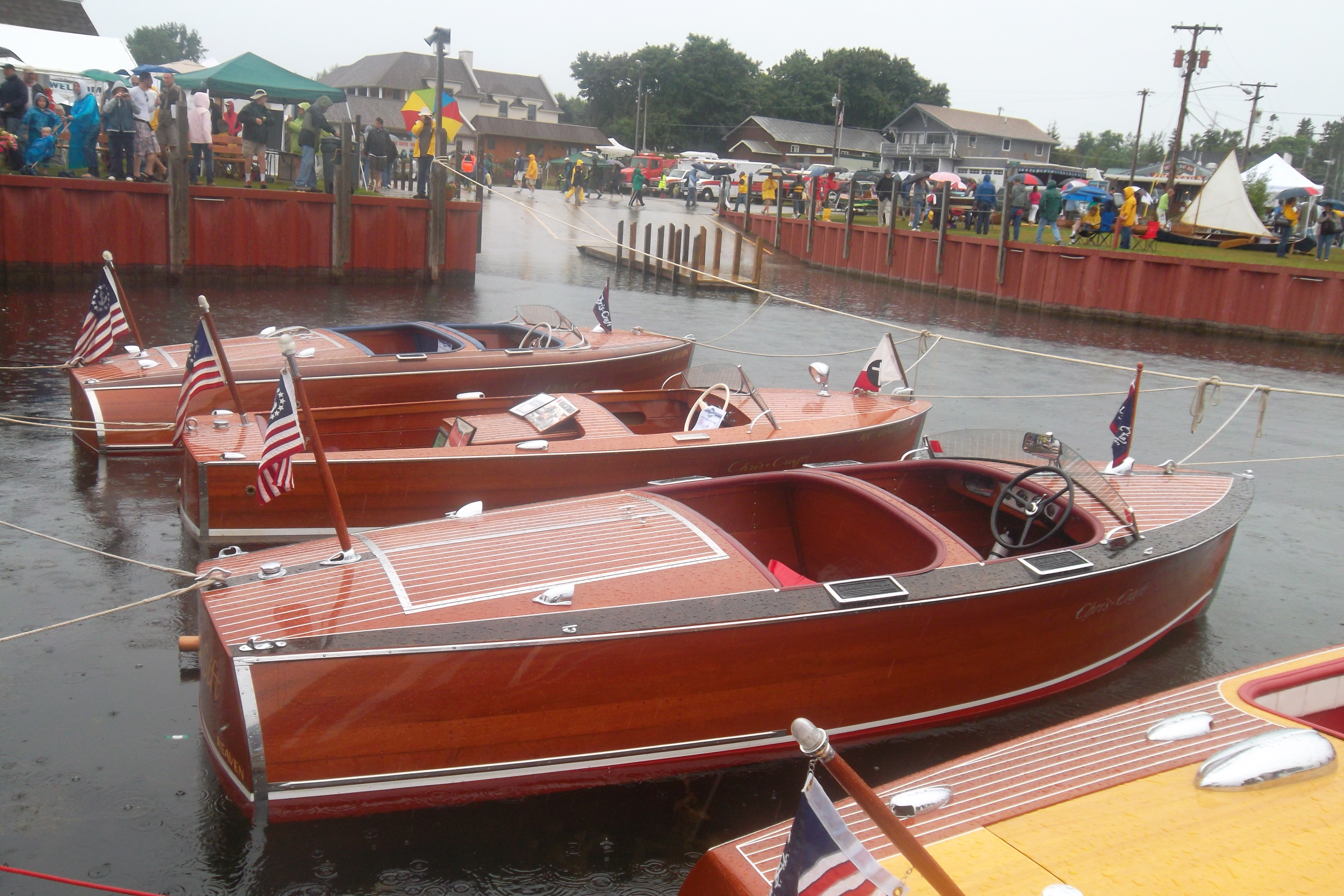
Antique boats

== Events ==
The entrance price for adults is $7, children between the ages of 12 and 18 the cost is $3 and there is no admissions for children under the ages of twelve.

The main attraction of the Antique Wooden Boat Show is the viewing of the antique boats. The Awards Ceremony is held at the end of the day where the winners of the show are announced. The other main attraction is the Festival of Arts. The Festival of Arts invites artists and craftspeople to join and sell or display their work, such as paintings, pottery, or anything they wish to bring. On average the Festival of Arts has up to 70 participants.

== Voting Directions ==
The winners of the antique boats are chosen by the visitors attending the event. All votes must be done in person. Each person will be given a booklet when entering with a page to write down the favorite boat of choice. Each boat is given a specific number. On the ballet the number of the boat will be needed and turned it into the designated area. The winners will be announced at the end of the day at the Awards Ceremony.

== Transportation ==
All together the Les Cheneaux Islands are made up of 36 islands. However, only two can be reached by car the rest can be reached by boat. Hessel can be reached by car but taking a boat is another option. The Mackinac Ferry provides transportation from Mackinaw City to Hessel and back.

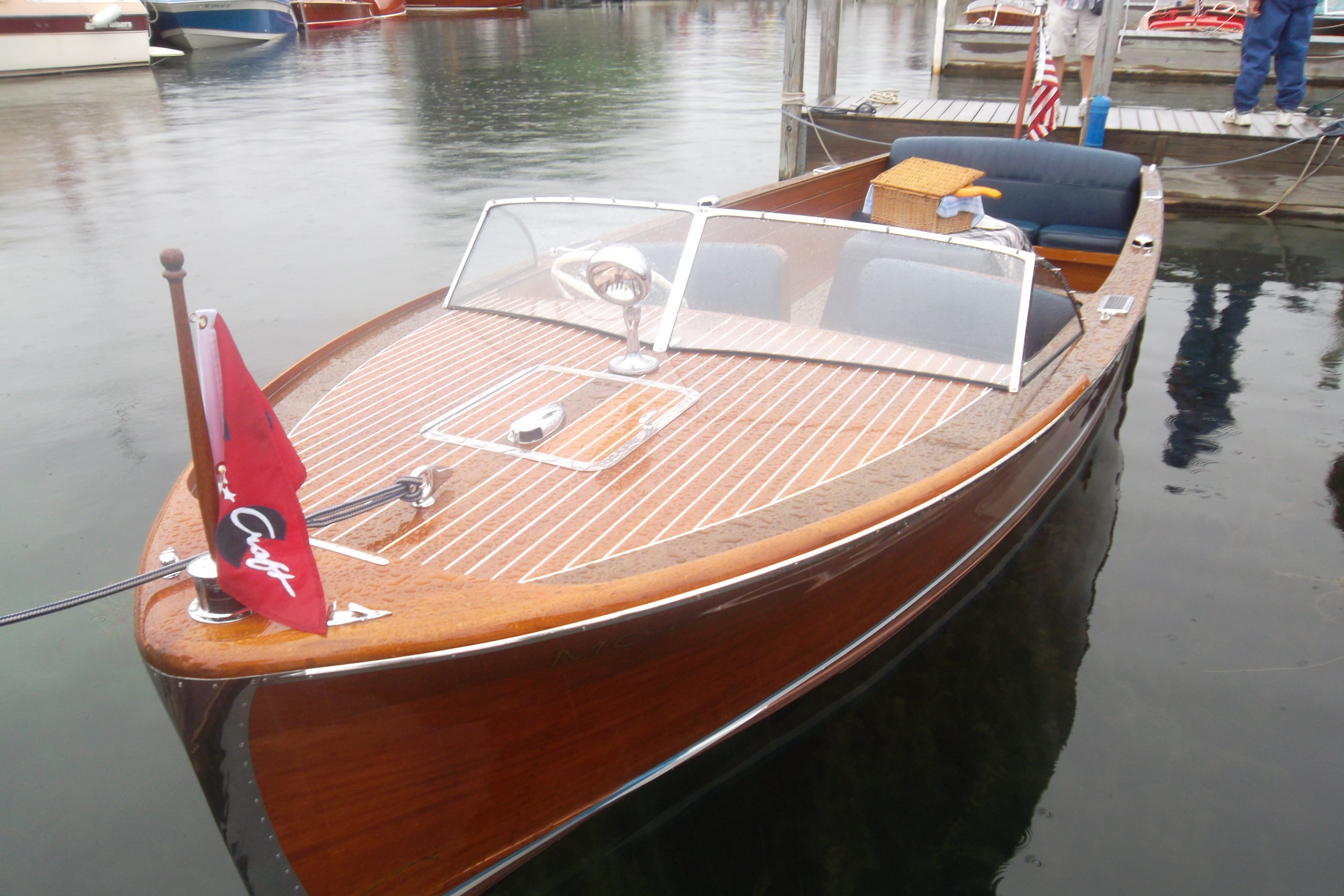
Antique boat

== Sponsors ==
The Antique Wooden Boat Show is sponsored by the Les Cheneaux Historical Association along with Mertaugh Boat Works, Hessel Harbor Association and Hessel Marina. All of the proceeds go towards the Les Cheneaux Historical Association. The money is used to help maintain the Historical and Maritime Museum, both in Cedarville, Michigan.
