= Goose Island (Michigan) =

Island in Lake Huron

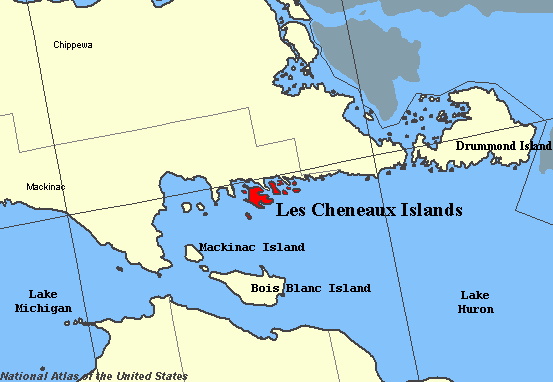
- Les Cheneaux Islands highlighted in red.

- Location within Michigan Location within the United States

Geography
- Location: Lake Huron
- Coordinates: 45.9222370°N 84.4303128°W
- Highest elevation: 587 ft (178.9 m)

Administration
- United States
- State: Michigan
- County: Mackinac County
- Township: Clark Township

Goose Island, located in Lake Huron, is positioned 3.25 miles from Brulee Point on the mainland. The island is within Clark Township, Mackinac County, in the U.S. state of Michigan. Goose Island is part of the Les Cheneaux Islands.
