= Shab-wa-way =

Odawa chief and orator

Chief, Odawa leader

Personal details
- Born: c. 1770 Upper Peninsula of Michigan
- Died: 1872 (aged 101–102) Marquette Island, Michigan
- Children: Pay-baw-me-say

Shab-wa-way (c. 1770 - 1872), also known by the names Chabowaywa, Shabwaway, Shab-we-we and Shabway among others, was an Odawa Chief who ruled over what are known today as Les Cheneaux Islands.

== Life ==
Tradition indicates that Shab-wa-way became a chief by heredity, but at what date is uncertain, as is also the extent of his domains and the population of his people. He certainly was a chief in authority, not only of Les Cheneaux Islands, but all the mainland lying between the Saint Marys and Pine Rivers, with territory extending as far north as the Munuscong River. His name was an Odawa phrase roughly translating to "voice that shakes the Earth" or "echo from a distance".

Shab-wa-way extended marked hospitality to the early voyagers and white pioneers, who, it is said, were welcome to enter his log cabin on Marquette Island. He was noted for demonstrating his most excellent skill as a storyteller, with firsthand accounts proclaiming he was "very proficient" in his day and generation.

He was a signatory of the Indian Treaties of March 28, 1836 (Treaty of Washington), and of July 31, 1855 (Treaty of Detroit), in which most of Northern Michigan and the Upper Peninsula was ceded to the United States, thus making Shab-wa-way the last native ruler of his territory.

Shab-wa-way died of an unknown illness in his log cabin in 1872. It's uncertain how old he was, but his family and most scholars are in agreement that he was over 100 years old at the time of death. The cabin was later burned down by hunters in the late 19th century.

== "The Old Chimney" ==
The stone chimney of the log cabin that still stands today was commemorated with a plaque:

"On this spot stood the log cabin of Chabowaway, [...] a leading chief of the Ottawa Indians. Here he and his ancestors lived for over a century and in this cabin he died about the year 1872 at the age, it is said, of over 100 years. March 28th, 1836, he represented his tribe and signed the Indian treaty at Washington, D.C., ceding most of northern Michigan to the United States, but reserving for himself and for his people 'The Islands of the Chenos'. He was succeeded by his son, 'Pay-Baw-Me-Say,' who took his father's name and who also died in this cabin, about the year 1882. Soon thereafter the cabin was burned down by a company of hunters."

The site became favoribly known among Les Cheneaux residents as "The Old Chimney", and was used by many of the young Les Cheneaux club members as a campsite well into the 20th century.
