= Marquette Island =

Island in Northern Lake Huron

- Location within Michigan Location within the United States

Geography
- Location: Lake Huron
- Coordinates: 45°57′37″N 84°23′37″W
- Area: 22.7 sq mi (59 km^{2})

Administration
- United States
- State: Michigan
- County: Mackinac County
- Township: Clark Township

Marquette Island (French: Île Marquette) is the largest of the 36 islands in the Les Cheneaux archipelago of northern Michigan, United States. Located in Mackinac County on the north shore of Lake Huron, the island has a small summer population. It is 6.5 miles (10.5 km) long and 3.5 miles (5.5 km) wide. Its geographic center is close to 45 degrees 57 minutes N., 84 degrees 23 minutes W.

== Description ==
A narrow, freshwater sound, the Les Cheneaux Channel, separates Marquette Island from the Upper Peninsula of Michigan. The channel shore of Marquette Island is lined with Edwardian boathouses and cottages, relics of the island's development as real estate in the early 1900s. At its most narrow, the channel is less than 0.25 miles (0.4 km) in width. The island's summer inhabitants often travel by water to the nearby towns of Cedarville and Hessel for the necessities of life. The Les Cheneaux Yacht Club, a social center of the islands, is located on Marquette Island.

Although Marquette Island is large, it is not as expansive as its overall dimensions might suggest, because it is deeply gouged by freshwater bays such as Duck Bay, Hessel Bay, Peck Bay, and Wilderness Bay. There are no bridges or other means of automobile access to the island, and no roads on the island. Because of this, most island landowners own some sort of water frontage or dock access. The waters adjacent to Marquette Island are noted for freshwater fishing, particularly for lake perch. The island is named in honor of missionary/explorer Jacques Marquette.

== Chief Shabwaway ==
Marquette Island was the home of Chief Shab-wa-way, whose homesite was located directly south across the channel from the present site of the Les Cheneaux Club golf course. A plaque was placed on this location by the Les Cheneaux Historical Association in 1982. The plaque describes the significance of this site as follows:

"On this spot stood the log cabin of Chabowaway (sometimes called 'Shab-wa-way' or 'Shabway'), a leading chief of the Ottawa Indians. Here he and his ancestors lived for over a century and in this cabin he died about the year 1872 at the age, it is said, of over 100 years. March 28th, 1836, he represented his tribe and signed the Indian Treaty at Washington, D.C., ceding most of northern Michigan to the United States but reserving for himself and for his people 'the Islands of the chenos' (Indian Treaties, Ed. of 1873, Vol. 1, p. 607). He was succeeded by his son 'Pay-Baw-Me-Say' who took his father's name and who also died in this cabin, about the year 1882. Soon thereafter the cabin was burned by a company of hunters."

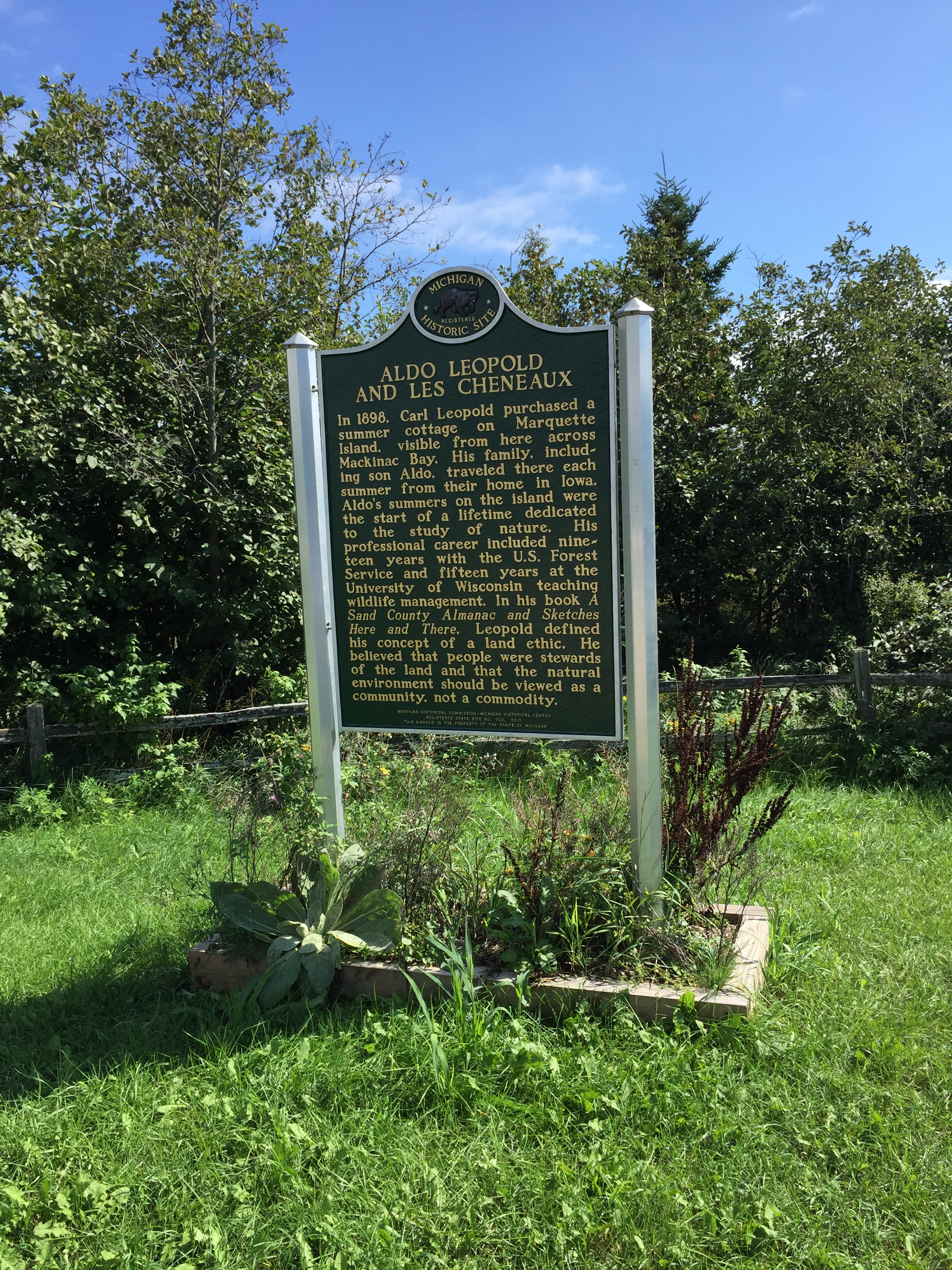
Aldo Leopold and Les Cheneaux Michigan Historical Marker

== Preservation ==
Between 1883 and 1887, the property on Club Point (the northernmost peninsula of Marquette Island) passed from the heirs of Shab-wa-way, through several temporary owners into the ownership of William L. Benham who purchased Club Point in 1888. Benham, Alfred E. Bousfield, and other investors, mostly from Bay City, MI, formed the Les Cheneaux Club, which attracted summer cottagers seeking to escape the heat and humidity of Chicago and other midwestern cities. The Club grounds contain a number of large summer homes which remain the most conspicuous feature of Marquette Island. Among the early members of the Club was the family of Aldo Leopold, who spent his childhood summers in the woods and waters of the Les Cheneaux Islands.

Five separate parcels of Island property have been dedicated as nature preserves. In 2022 the newest such parcel, the 130-acre Kathy Bricker Nature Lover Preserve, was set aside. The new Preserve is a land parcel adjacent to the 1,683-acre Aldo Leopold Nature Preserve, the largest conservancy parcel on the Island. Both parcels are overseen by the Little Traverse Conservancy, a Northern Michigan private-sector land conservancy group.
