= Detour Township, Michigan =

DeTour Township, Michigan
- Civil township
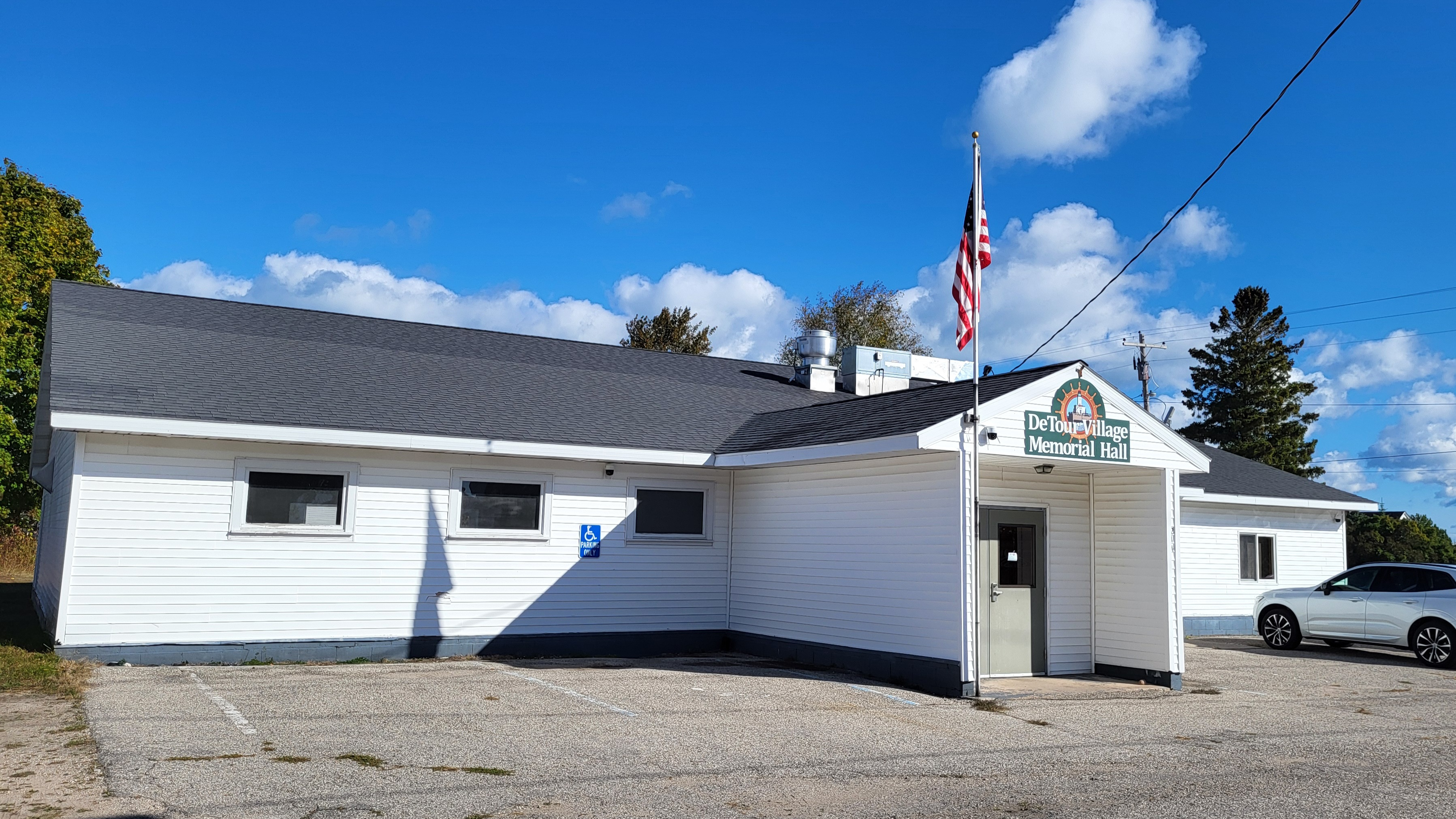
- DeTour Village Memorial Hall

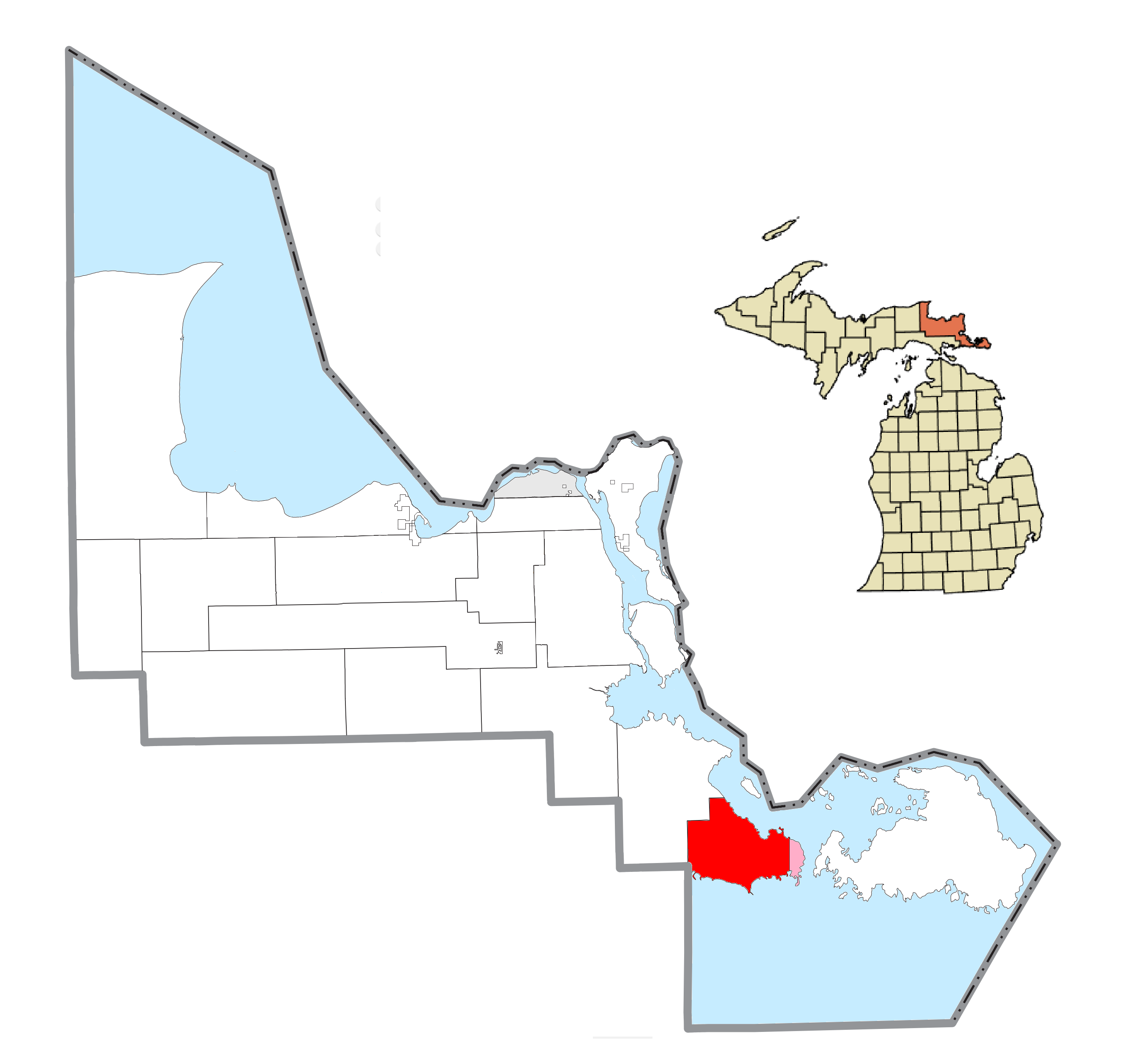
- Location within Chippewa County (red) and the administered village of DeTour (pink)

- Location within the state of Michigan Location within the United States
- Coordinates: 45°59′54″N 83°58′01″W
- Country: United States
- State: Michigan
- County: Chippewa
- Established: 1850 (Warner Township); 1856 (Detour Township); 1953 (DeTour Township)

Government
  - Supervisor: Thomas Lehman
  - Clerk: Marilyn McGuire

Area
  - Total: 75.44 sq mi (195.39 km^{2})
  - Land: 48.77 sq mi (126.31 km^{2})
  - Water: 26.67 sq mi (69.07 km^{2})
- Elevation: 633 ft (193 m)

Population (2020)
  - Total: 671
  - Density: 13.8/sq mi (5.3/km^{2})
- Time zone: UTC-5 (Eastern (EST))
  - Summer (DST): UTC-4 (EDT)
- ZIP code(s): 49725 (DeTour Village); 49736 (Goetzville)
- Area code: 906
- FIPS code: 26-21770
- GNIS feature ID: 1626180
- Website: Official website

DeTour Township is a civil township of Chippewa County in the U.S. state of Michigan. The population was 671 at the 2020 census. The township is at the extreme eastern tip of the Upper Peninsula.

== History ==
The area was organized in 1850 as Warren Township, named after Ebenezer Warren, the first postmaster of the township. The principal settlement, later known as De Tour Village, was named as Warrenville on an 1848 map. The village name was changed to DeTour in 1856 and the township followed suit. The spelling of the village name was changed to "De Tour" in 1953.

== Geography ==
The township is bordered by the St. Marys River to the north, Lake Huron to the south, and De Tour Passage to the east, which separates the township from Drummond Island. According to the United States Census Bureau, the township has a total area of 75.4 square miles (195.4 km^{2}), of which 48.8 square miles (126.3 km^{2}) is land and 26.7 square miles (69.1 km^{2}), or 35.35%, is water.

== Communities ==
- De Tour Village is at the eastern end of the township.

== Demographics ==
As of the census of 2000, there were 894 people, 418 households, and 265 families residing in the township. The population density was 18.3 inhabitants per square mile (7.1/km^{2}). There were 851 housing units at an average density of 17.4 per square mile (6.7/km^{2}). The racial makeup of the township was 84.68% White, 11.74% Native American, 0.22% Asian, 0.11% from other races, and 3.24% from two or more races. Hispanic or Latino of any race were 1.34% of the population.

There were 418 households, out of which 16.3% had children under the age of 18 living with them, 55.5% were married couples living together, 5.3% had a female householder with no husband present, and 36.4% were non-families. 32.3% of all households were made up of individuals, and 18.2% had someone living alone who was 65 years of age or older. The average household size was 2.14 and the average family size was 2.65.

In the township the population was spread out, with 16.7% under the age of 18, 4.5% from 18 to 24, 19.2% from 25 to 44, 34.9% from 45 to 64, and 24.7% who were 65 years of age or older. The median age was 52 years. For every 100 females, there were 96.9 males. For every 100 females age 18 and over, there were 99.2 males.

The median income for a household in the township was $36,500, and the median income for a family was $42,727. Males had a median income of $31,667 versus $28,125 for females. The per capita income for the township was $19,984. About 2.8% of families and 6.0% of the population were below the poverty line, including 12.7% of those under age 18 and 6.0% of those age 65 or over.
