= Big St. Martin Island =

Island in Mackinac County, Michigan, United States

- Location within Michigan

Geography
- Location: Lake Huron
- Coordinates: 45°58′06″N 84°37′41″W

Administration
- United States
- State: Michigan
- County: Mackinac County
- Township: St. Ignace Township

Big St. Martin Island is an island in Mackinac County of the U.S. state of Michigan. It is located in St. Martin Bay, a bay of Lake Huron.

Like other islands in and around the Mackinac Straits, Big St. Martin Island is believed to be sacred ground to local Native Americans. The island was privately owned as of 2010.

== See also ==
- List of islands of Michigan
