= Les Cheneaux Islands =

Group of islands in the U.S. part of Lake Huron

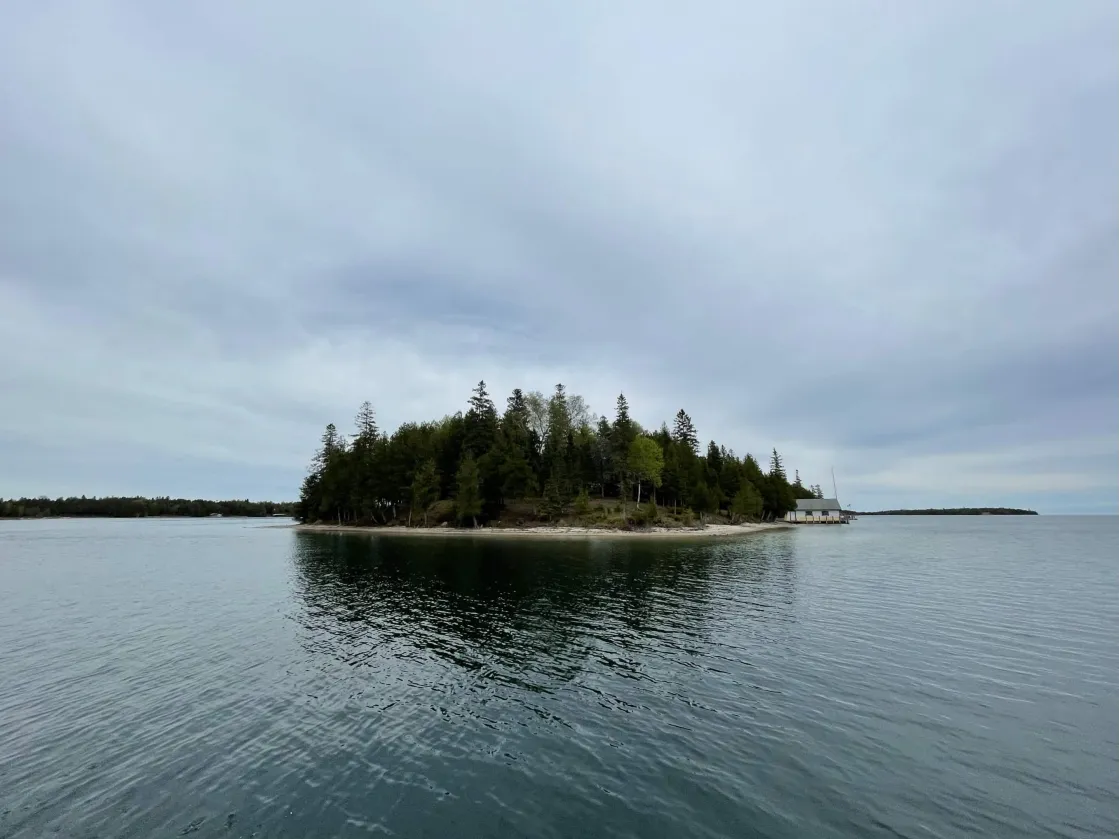
- Eastern tip of Government Island, May 2022

- Location within Michigan

Geography
- Location: Lake Huron
- Coordinates: 45°57′34″N 84°19′29″W
- Total islands: 36

Administration
- United States
- State: Michigan
- County: Mackinac County
- Township: Clark Township

Les Cheneaux Islands (/ˌleɪ ʃəˈnoʊ/ lay-sha-NO; French: "The Channels") are an archipelago of 36 small islands, some inhabited, along 12 miles of Lake Huron shoreline on the southeastern tip of the Upper Peninsula of Michigan in the United States. It was named by French explorers in the 17th century, after the many navigable channels between the islands in the group. The chain is situated approximately 30 miles northeast of Mackinac Island and about 35 miles south of Sault Ste. Marie. They are under the jurisdiction of Clark Township in Mackinac County, mostly in and around Cedarville, home to the Les Cheneaux Historical and Maritime museums.

== History ==
The area that encompasses Les Cheneaux was traditionally occupied by the Wyandotte and the Odawa people. In 1634 French colonial explorer Jean Nicolet navigated the channels of Les Cheneaux while attempting to reach Michilimackinac via Lake Huron (then referred to as Mer Douce). He was accompanied by seven Wyandotte tribesmen. Nicolet and later explorers noted that the locals referred to the chain as Onomonee or Anaminang, derived from the Odawa word for "island", minis. Jacques Marquette was the first European to draw a map of Les Cheneaux, while navigating it during the summer of 1671.

By the late 17th century, the fur trade dominated the island chain. The Odawa officially had jurisdiction over the area until the land was ceded following the Treaty of Washington (1836), in which much of the Upper Peninsula became U.S. territory. Chief Shab-wa-way was a signatory of the treaty and thus the last Indian ruler of Les Cheneaux.

== Overview ==
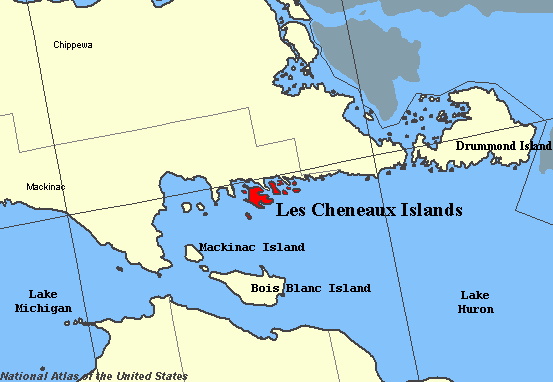
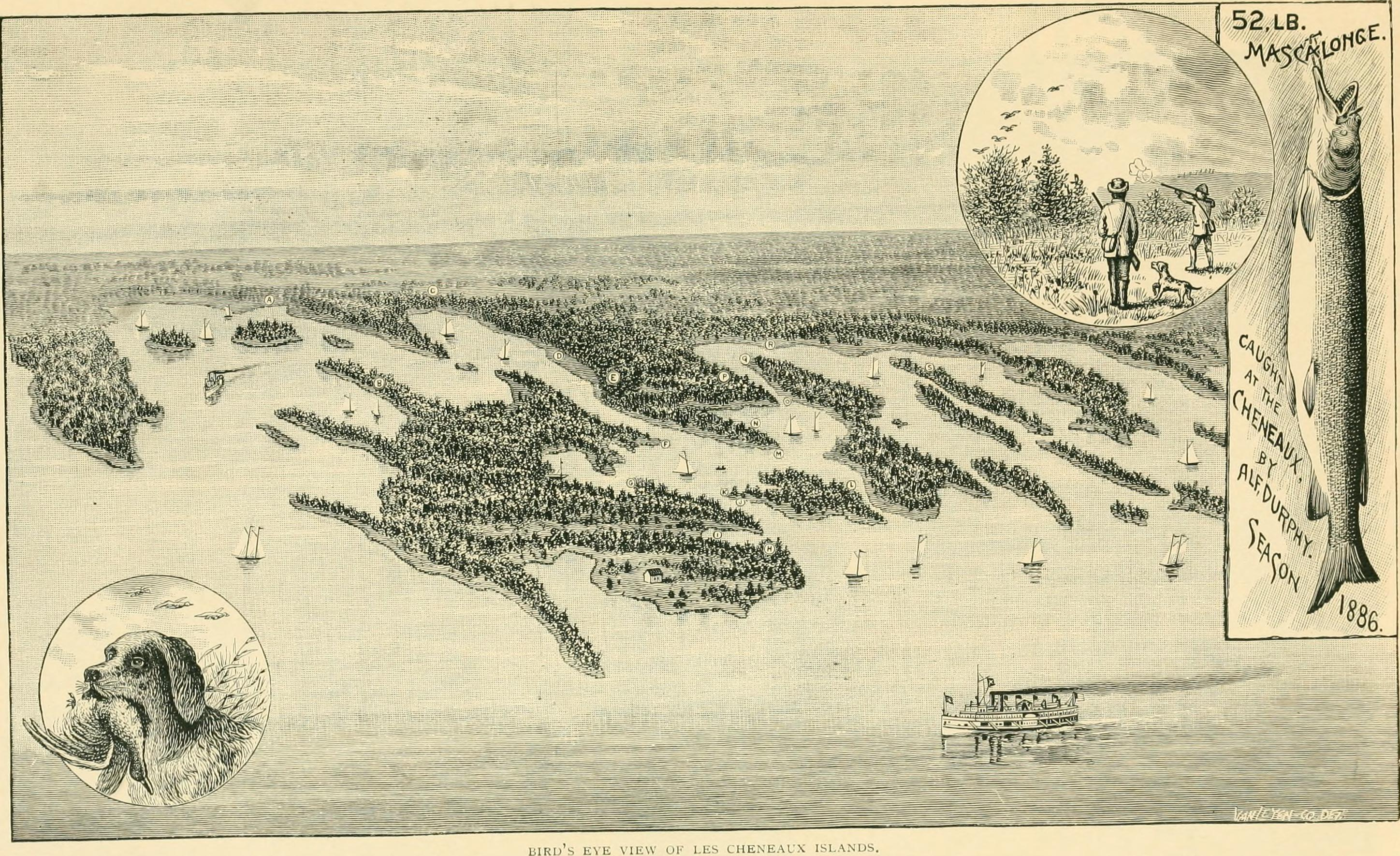
Top: Map of the Les Cheneaux Islands. Bottom: Map from the 1890s.

32 of the 36 islands are named. They include:

- Alligator Island
- Bear Island
- Birch Island
- Boot Island
- Burnham Island
- Coryell Island
- Cove Island
- Crow Island
- Dollar Island
- Echo Island
- Eagle Island
- Goat Island
- Goose Island
- Government Island
- Gravelly Island
- Haven Island
- Hill Island
- Holsinger Island
- Island No. 8
- La Salle Island
- Little Island (A.K.A. "Skunk Island")
- Little Joe's Island (A.K.A. "White Loon Island")
- Little La Salle Island
- Lone Susan Island
- Long Island
- Marquette Island
- Penny Island
- Rodger Island
- Rover Island
- St. Ledger Island
- Strongs Island
- Winona Island

The island chain forms many bays, harbors, and inland lakes, including:

- Bass Cove Lake
- Bush Bay
- Cedarville Bay
- Duck Bay
- Flower Bay
- Government Bay
- Mackinac Bay
- Marquette Bay
- McKay Bay
- Melchers Bay
- Mismer Bay
- Muscallonge Bay
- Peck Bay
- Prentiss Bay
- Sand Bay
- Scammons Harbor
- Sheppard Bay
- Urie Bay
- Voight Bay
- Wilderness Bay
