= Seaweed (disambiguation) =

Seaweed is a generic name for various types of underwater algae and aquatic plants.

The term may also refer to:

- Edible seaweed, algae that can be eaten or used in the preparation of food
- Seaweed (band), an American rock band
- Seaweed (musician), a rock musician
- Seaweed, stage name of Christopher Lenox-Smith, keyboard player for the Ozric Tentacles
- Silas Seaweed, a mystery book series by Stanley Evans (author)
