= Sims Township, Michigan =

- Civil township
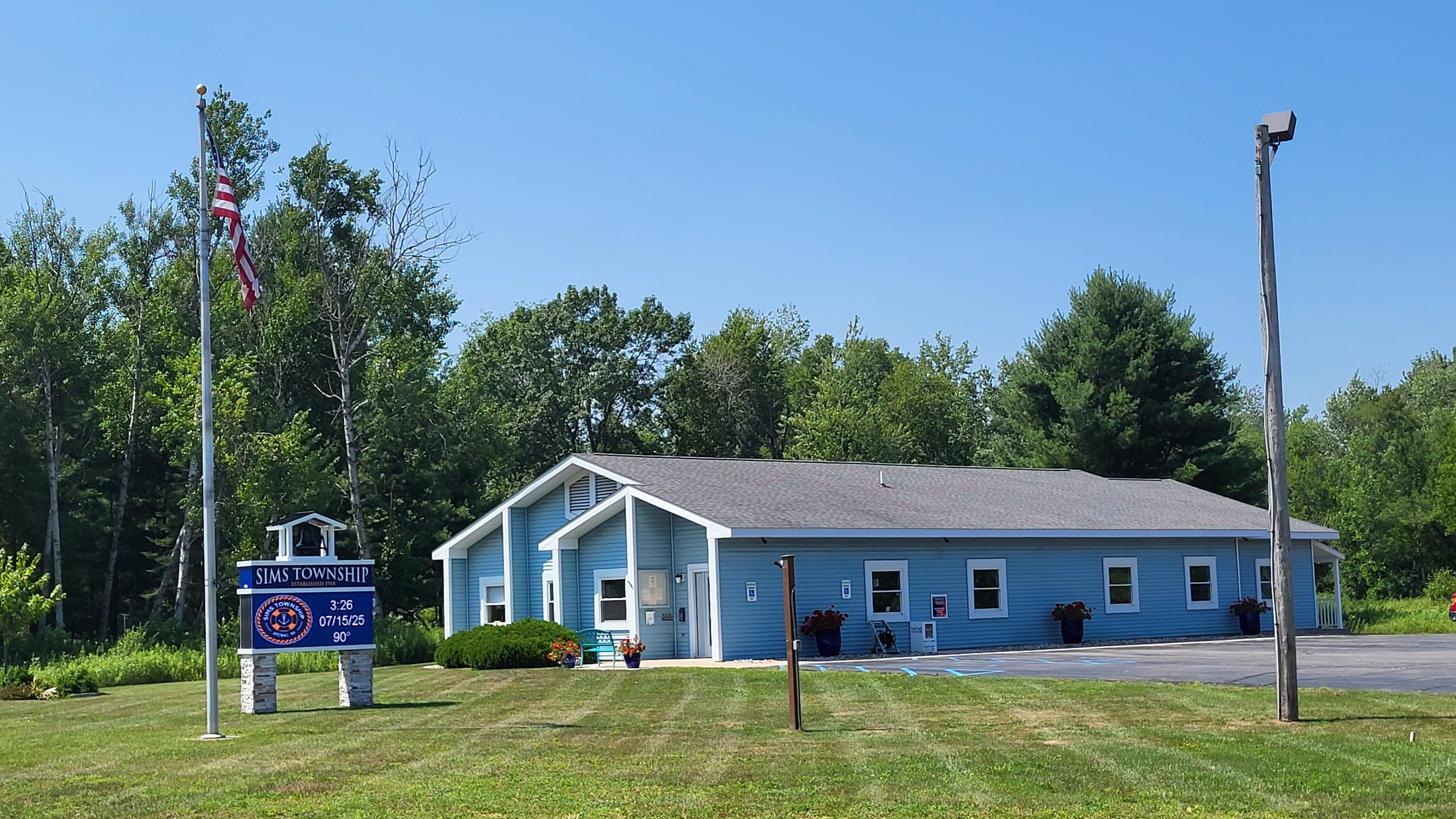
- Sims Township Hall

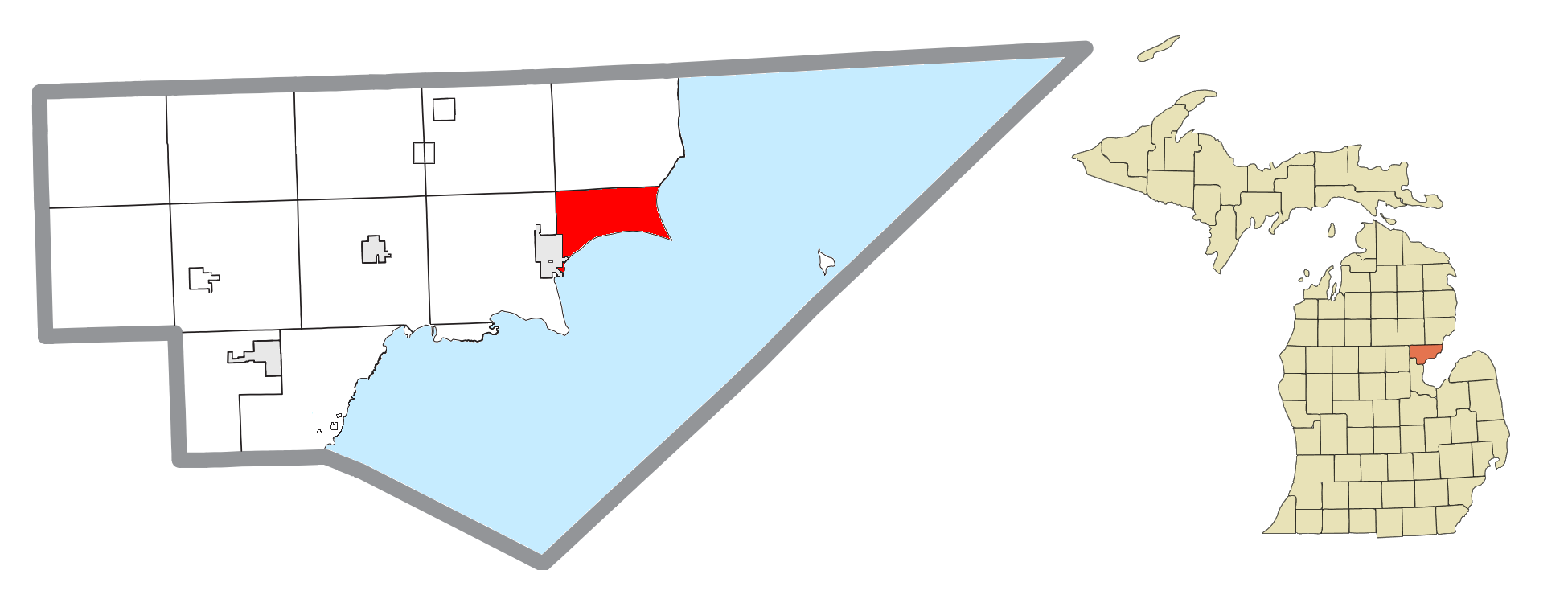
- Location within Arenac County

- Location within the state of Michigan Sims Township (the United States)
- Coordinates: 44°03′40″N 83°37′32″W
- Country: United States
- State: Michigan
- County: Arenac

Area
  - Total: 46.7 sq mi (120.9 km^{2})
  - Land: 11.5 sq mi (29.8 km^{2})
  - Water: 35.2 sq mi (91.1 km^{2})
- Elevation: 594 ft (181 m)

Population (2020)
  - Total: 986
  - Density: 85.7/sq mi (33.1/km^{2})
- Time zone: UTC-5 (Eastern (EST))
  - Summer (DST): UTC-4 (EDT)
- ZIP code(s): 48703
- Area code: 989
- FIPS code: 26-74020
- GNIS feature ID: 1627084
- Website: Official website

Sims Township is a civil township of Arenac County in the U.S. state of Michigan. The population was 986 at the 2020 census.

== Geography ==
According to the United States Census Bureau, the township has a total area of 46.7 square miles (120.9 km^{2}), of which 11.5 square miles (29.8 km^{2}) is land and 35.2 square miles (91.1 km^{2}), or 75.35%, is water. The township includes Little Charity Island, located 5 miles (8 km) offshore in Saginaw Bay of Lake Huron.

== Demographics ==
As of the census of 2000, there were 1,091 people, 503 households, and 353 families residing in the township. The population density was 94.6 inhabitants per square mile (36.5/km^{2}). There were 1,111 housing units at an average density of 96.4 per square mile (37.2/km^{2}). The racial makeup of the township was 97.80% White, 0.82% Native American, 0.37% Asian, 0.09% from other races, and 0.92% from two or more races. Hispanic or Latino of any race were 1.56% of the population.

There were 503 households, out of which 17.9% had children under the age of 18 living with them, 62.2% were married couples living together, 5.8% had a female householder with no husband present, and 29.8% were non-families. 26.4% of all households were made up of individuals, and 11.3% had someone living alone who was 65 years of age or older. The average household size was 2.17 and the average family size was 2.56.

In the township the population was spread out, with 16.7% under the age of 18, 4.9% from 18 to 24, 19.9% from 25 to 44, 33.4% from 45 to 64, and 25.2% who were 65 years of age or older. The median age was 51 years. For every 100 females, there were 100.6 males. For every 100 females age 18 and over, there were 102.9 males.

The median income for a household in the township was $35,703, and the median income for a family was $41,932. Males had a median income of $43,750 versus $24,545 for females. The per capita income for the township was $25,135. About 5.7% of families and 9.6% of the population were below the poverty line, including 23.5% of those under age 18 and 1.5% of those age 65 or over.
