= Lake Huron =

One of the Great Lakes of North America

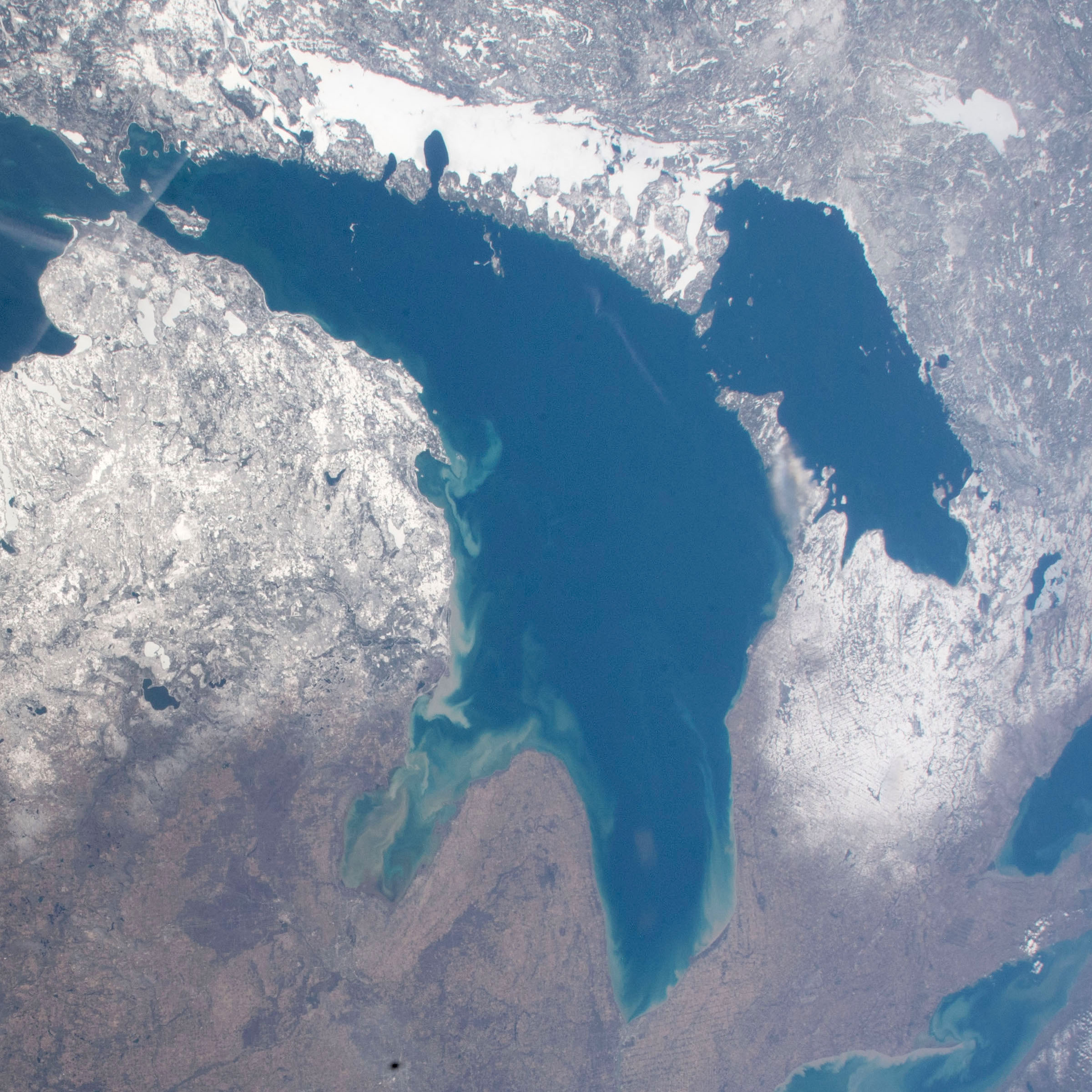
- Lake Huron, Georgian Bay, and the frozen North Channel (top) seen from the International Space Station on April 20, 2018

- Location within North America

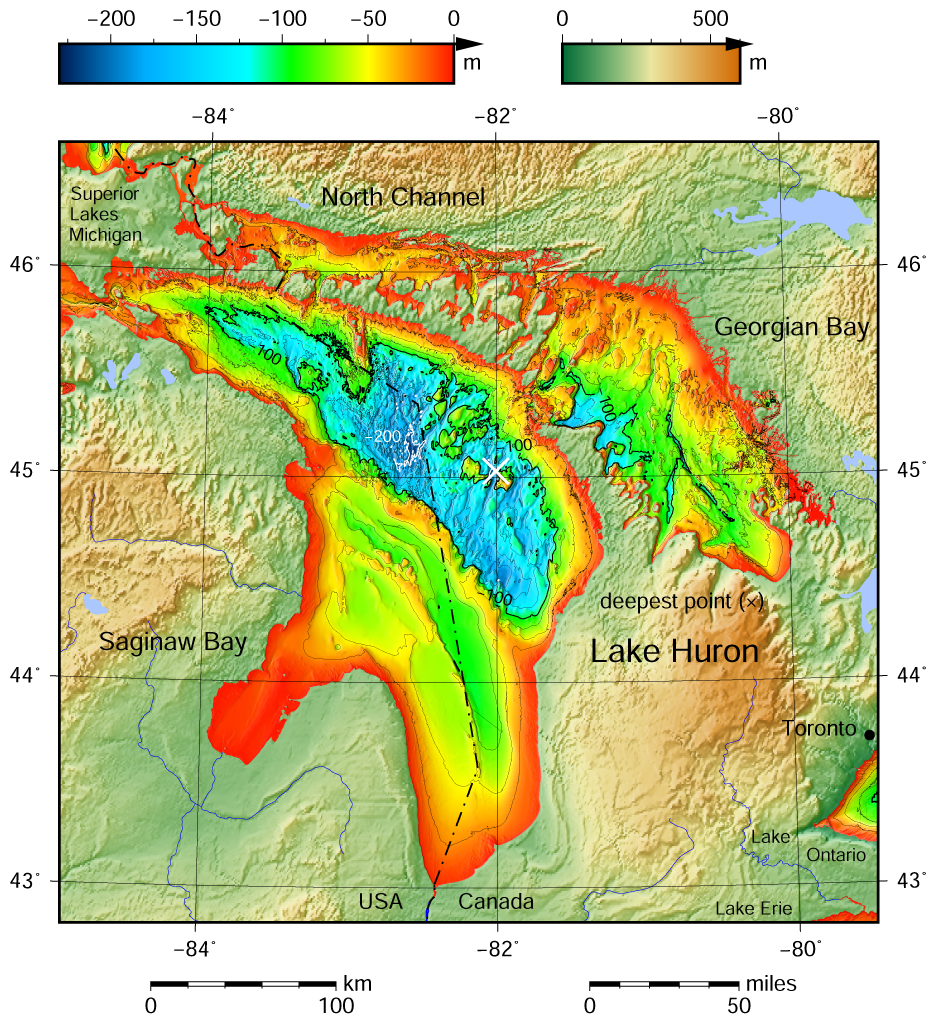
- Lake Huron bathymetric map. The deepest point is marked with "×".
- Location: North America
- Group: Great Lakes
- Coordinates: 44.8°N 82.4°W
- Lake type: Glacial
- Primary inflows: Straits of Mackinac, St. Marys River
- Primary outflows: St. Clair River
- Catchment area: 51,700 square miles (134,000 km^{2})
- Basin countries: Canada and the United States
- Max. length: 206 mi (332 km)
- Max. width: 183 mi (295 km)
- Surface area: 23,000 square miles (59,570 km^{2})
- Average depth: 195 ft (59 m)
- Max. depth: 750 ft (229 m)
- Water volume: 844.8 cu mi (3,521 km^{3})
- Residence time: 22 years
- Shore length^{1}: 1,850 mi (2,980 km) plus 1,980 mi (3,190 km) for islands
- Surface elevation: 577 ft (176 m)
- Islands: Manitoulin
- Sections/sub-basins: Georgian Bay, North Channel
- Settlements: Bay City, Alpena, Cheboygan, St. Ignace, Port Huron in Michigan; Goderich, Sarnia, Owen Sound in Ontario
- ^{1} Shore length is not a well-defined measure.

Map of Lake Huron and the other Great Lakes

Lake Huron (/ˈhjʊərɒn, -ən/ HURE-on, -ən) is one of the five Great Lakes of North America. It is shared on the north and east by the Canadian province of Ontario and on the south and west by the U.S. state of Michigan. The name of the lake is derived from early French explorers who named it for the indigenous people they knew as Huron (Wyandot) inhabiting the region. Hydrologically, Lake Huron comprises the eastern portion of Lake Michigan–Huron, having the same surface elevation as Lake Michigan, to which it is connected by the wide and deep Straits of Mackinac. Combined, Lake Michigan–Huron is the largest freshwater lake by area in the world. The Huronian glaciation was named from evidence collected from the Lake Huron region. The northern parts of the lake include the North Channel and Georgian Bay. Saginaw Bay is located in the southwest corner of the lake. The main inlet is the St. Marys River from Lake Superior, and the main outlet is through the St. Clair River toward Lake Erie. Lake Huron has a fairly large drainage basin covering parts of Michigan and Ontario. Water flows through Lake Huron faster than the other Great Lakes with a retention time of only 22 years.

== Geography ==
By surface area, Lake Huron is the second-largest of the Great Lakes, with a surface area of 23,000 square miles (59,570 km^{2}). It is the third-largest fresh water lake on Earth (or the fourth-largest lake, if the Caspian Sea is counted as a lake). By volume however, Lake Huron is only the third largest of the Great Lakes, being surpassed by Lake Michigan and Lake Superior. When measured at the low water datum, the lake contains a volume of 850 cubic miles (3,500 km^{3}) and a shoreline length (including islands) of 3,827 mi (6,159 km).

The surface of Lake Huron is 577 feet (176 m) above sea level. The lake's average depth is 32 fathoms 3 feet (195 ft; 59 m), while the maximum recorded depth is 125 fathoms (750 ft; 229 m). It has a length of 206 statute miles (332 km; 179 nmi) and a greatest breadth of 183 statute miles (295 km; 159 nmi). The lake is split into five basins, those being the Northern/Southern Main Basins (separated by the Alpena-Amberley Ridge), Georgian Bay, Saginaw Bay and the North Channel. A notable feature of the lake is Manitoulin Island, which separates the North Channel and Georgian Bay from the main basin. It is the largest freshwater island on Earth.

Cities with over 10,000 people on Lake Huron include Sarnia, the largest city on Lake Huron, and Saugeen Shores in Canada and Bay City, Port Huron, and Alpena in the United States. Major centres on Georgian Bay include Owen Sound, Wasaga Beach, Collingwood, Midland, Penetanguishene, Port Severn and Parry Sound.

=== Water levels ===
Historic high water The lake fluctuates from month to month with the highest lake levels in October and November. The normal high-water mark is 2.00 feet (0.61 m) above datum (577.5 ft or 176.0 m). In the summer of 1986, Lakes Michigan and Huron reached their then highest level at 5.92 feet (1.80 m) above datum. The high-water records were broken for several months in a row in 2020.

Historic low water Lake levels tend to be the lowest in winter. The normal low-water mark is 1.00 foot (30 cm) below datum (577.5 ft or 176.0 m). In the winter of 1964, Lakes Michigan and Huron reached their then lowest level at 1.38 feet (42 cm) below datum. As with the high-water records, monthly low-water records were set each month from February 1964 through January 1965. During this twelve-month period, water levels ranged from 1.38 to 0.71 feet (42–22 cm) below Chart Datum. The all-time low-water mark was eclipsed in January 2013.

== Geology ==
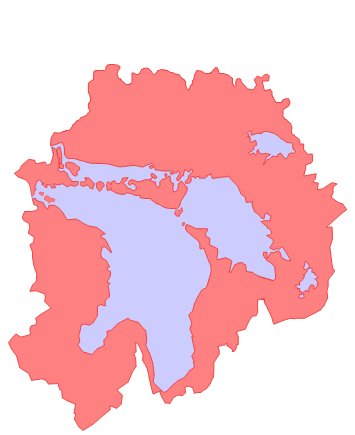
Lake Huron Basin

Counting its 30,000 islands, Lake Huron has the largest shore line length of any of the Great Lakes. It is separated from Lake Michigan, which lies at the same level, by the 5-mile-wide (8.0 km), 20-fathom-deep (120 ft; 37 m) Straits of Mackinac, making them hydrologically the same body of water (sometimes called Lake Michigan-Huron and sometimes described as two 'lobes of the same lake'). Aggregated, Lake Huron-Michigan, at 45,300 square miles (117,000 km^{2}), "is technically the world's largest freshwater lake". Lake Superior, at 21 feet higher elevation, drains into the St. Marys River which then flows into Lake Huron. The water then flows south to the St. Clair River, at Port Huron, Michigan, and Sarnia, Ontario. The Great Lakes Waterway continues thence to Lake St. Clair; the Detroit River and Detroit, Michigan; into Lake Erie and thence – via Lake Ontario and the St. Lawrence River – to the Atlantic Ocean.

Like the other Great Lakes, it was formed by melting ice as the continental glaciers retreated toward the end of the last ice age. Before this, Lake Huron was a low-lying depression through which flowed the now-buried Laurentian and Huronian Rivers; the lake bed was criss-crossed by a large network of tributaries to these ancient waterways, with many of the old channels still evident on bathymetric maps.

The Alpena-Amberley Ridge is an ancient ridge beneath the surface of Lake Huron, running from Alpena, Michigan, southeast to Point Clark, Ontario.

== History ==
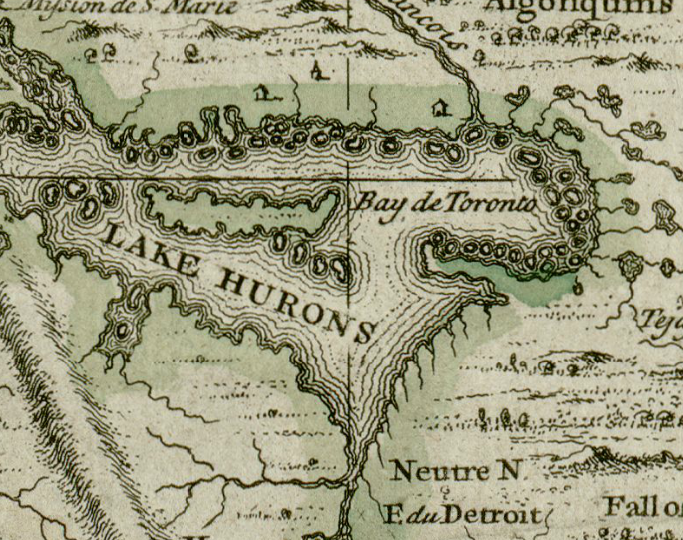
1680 British map of Lake Huron

About 9,000 years ago, when water levels in Lake Huron were approximately 100 m (330 ft) below today's levels, the Alpena-Amberley Ridge was exposed. That land bridge was used as a migration route for large herds of caribou. Since 2008, archaeologists have discovered at least 60 stone constructions along the submerged ridge that are thought to have been used as hunting blinds by Paleo-Indians. That a trade network brought obsidian from Oregon almost ten thousand years ago to be used for toolmaking was confirmed by a 2013 underwater discovery along the ridge.

On the eve of European contact, the extent of development among Eastern Woodlands Native American societies is indicated by the archaeological evidence of a town on or near Lake Huron that contained more than one hundred large structures housing a total population of between 4,000 and 6,000. The French, the first European visitors to the region, often referred to Lake Huron as La Mer Douce, "the fresh-water sea". In 1656, a map by French cartographer Nicolas Sanson refers to the lake by the name Karegnondi, a Wyandot word that has been translated variously, as "Freshwater Sea", "Lake of the Hurons", or simply "lake". Generally, the lake was labeled "Lac des Hurons" (Lake of the Huron) on most early European maps.

By the 1860s, many European settlements on the shores of Lake Huron were becoming incorporated, including Sarnia, the largest city on Lake Huron. On October 26, 2010, the Karegnondi Water Authority was formed to build and manage a pipeline from the lake to Flint, Michigan.

== Shipwrecks ==
More than a thousand wrecks have been recorded in Lake Huron. Of these, 185 are located in Saginaw Bay, and 116 are found in the 448-square-mile (1,160 km^{2}) Thunder Bay National Marine Sanctuary and Underwater Preserve, which was established in 2000. Georgian Bay contains 212 sunken vessels.

Purportedly the first European vessel to sail the Great Lakes, Le Griffon also became the first ship lost on the Great Lakes. It was built in 1679 on the eastern shore of Lake Erie near Buffalo, New York. Robert Cavalier, Sieur de la Salle navigated across Lake Erie, up the Detroit River, Lake St. Clair and the St. Clair River out into Lake Huron. Passing the Straits of Mackinac, La Salle made landfall on Washington Island, off the tip of the Door Peninsula on the Wisconsin side of Lake Michigan. La Salle filled Le Griffon with pelts and in late November 1679 sent Le Griffon back to the site of modern-day Buffalo, never to be seen again. Two wrecks have been identified as Le Griffon, although neither has gained final verification as the actual wreck. Blown by a fierce storm after leaving, Le Griffon ran aground before the storm. The people of Manitoulin Island say that the wreck in Mississagi Strait at the western tip of the island is that of Le Griffon. Meanwhile, others near Tobermory, say that the wreck on Russell Island, 150 miles (240 km) farther east in Georgian Bay, is that of Le Griffon.

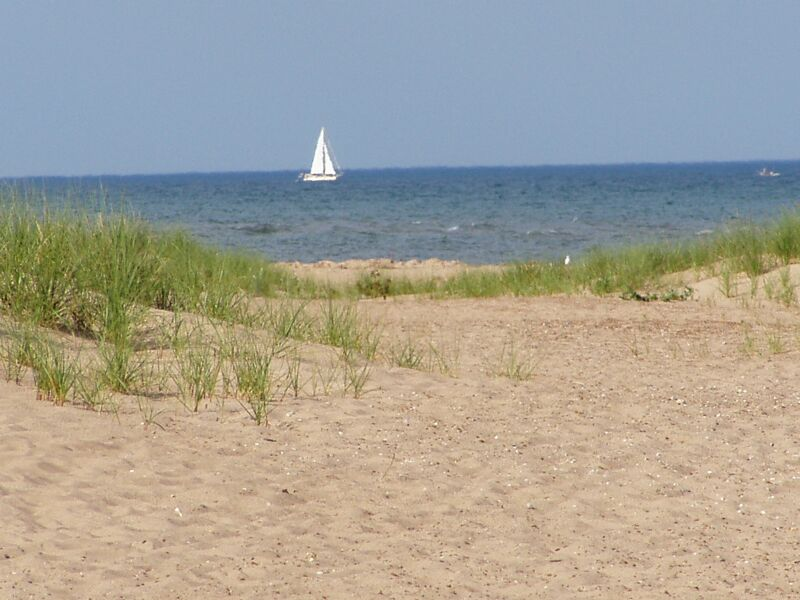
View of Lake Huron from East Tawas State Park at the head of Saginaw Bay

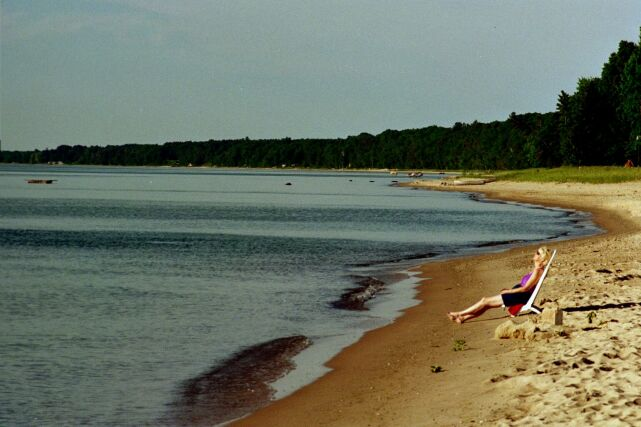
Harrisville Beach on Lake Huron

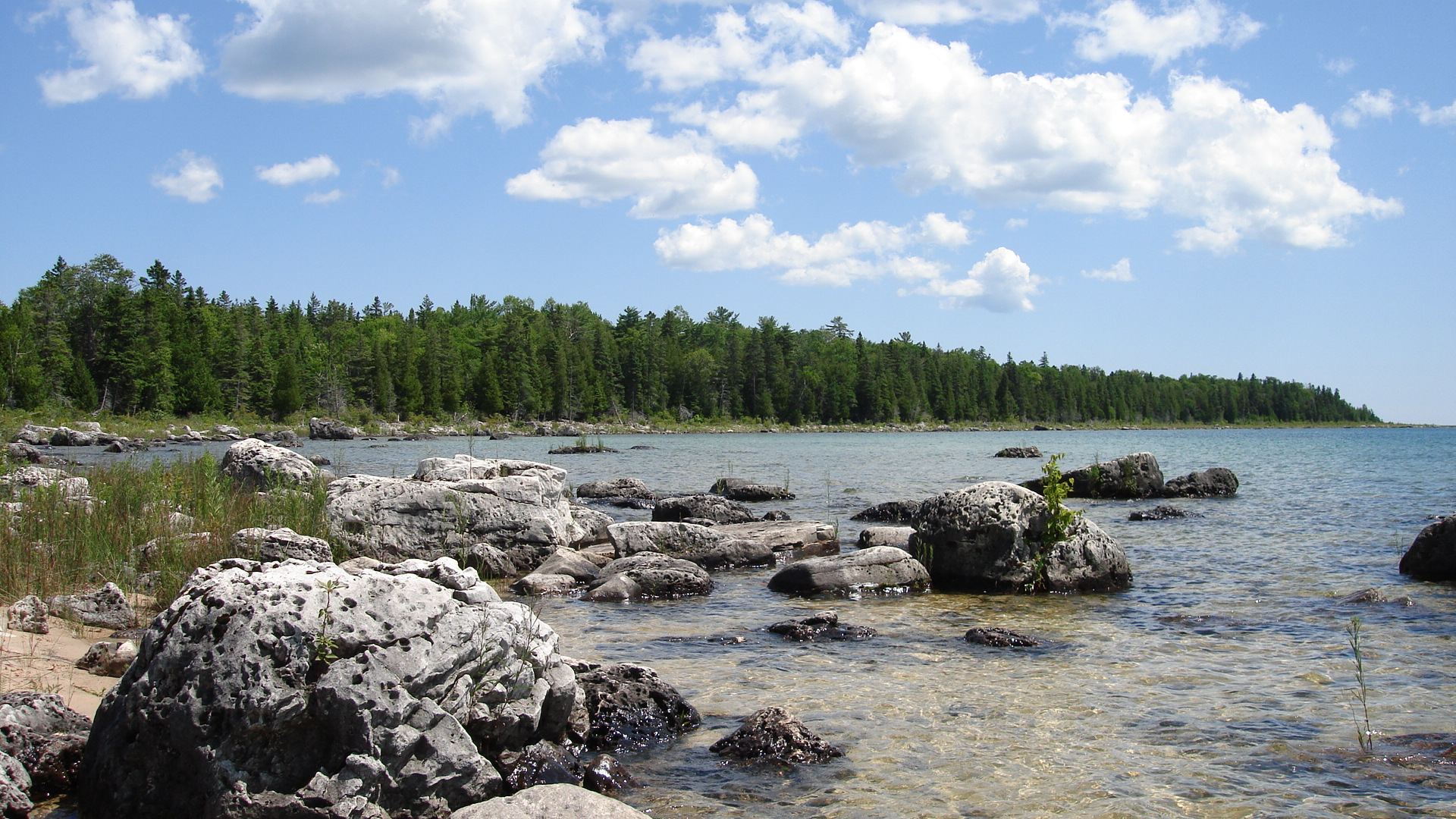
View of rocky shore of Lake Huron from east of Port Dolomite, Michigan, in the upper peninsula

=== Storm of 1913 ===
On November 9, 1913, the Great Lakes Storm of 1913 in Lake Huron sank 10 ships, and more than 20 were driven ashore. The storm, which raged for 16 hours, killed 235 seamen.

Matoa—a propeller freighter measuring 2,311 gross register tons—had passed between Port Huron, Michigan, and Sarnia, Ontario, just after midnight. On November 9, just after six in the morning, Senator pushed upstream. Less than an hour later, Manola—a propeller freighter of 2,325 gross register tons also built in Cleveland in 1890—passed through. Captain Frederick W. Light of Manola reported that both the Canadian and the American weather stations had storm flag signals flying from their weather towers. Following behind at 7:00 a.m. that Sunday, Regina steamed out of Sarnia into the northwest gale. The warnings had been up for four hours. Manola passed Regina off Port Sanilac, 22 statute miles (19 nmi; 35 km) up the lake. Captain Light determined that if it continued to deteriorate, he would seek shelter at Harbor Beach, Michigan, another 30 statute miles (26 nmi; 48 km) up the lake. There, he could seek shelter behind the breakwater. Before he reached Harbor Beach, the winds turned to the northeast and the lake began to rise. It was noon when he reached Harbor Beach and ran for shelter.

The waves were so violent that Manola touched bottom entering the harbor. With help from a tugboat, Manola tied up to the break wall with eight lines. It was about 3:00 p.m. when Manola was secured and the crew prepared to drop anchor. As they worked, the cables began to snap from wind pressure against the hull. To keep from being pushed aground, they kept their bow into the wind with the engines running half to full in turns, yet the ship still drifted 800 feet (240 m) before its movement was arrested. Waves breaking over the ship damaged several windows, and the crew reported seeing portions of the concrete break wall peeling off as the waves struck it. Meanwhile, fifty miles farther up the lake, Matoa and Captain Hugh McLeod had to ride out the storm without a safe harbor. Matoa was found stranded on the Port Austin reef when the winds subsided.

It was noon on Monday before the winds let up and not until 11:00 p.m. that night before Captain Light determined it to be safe to continue his journey. Although Manola survived the storm, she was renamed Mapledawn in 1920, and on November 24, 1924, she became stranded on Christian Island in Georgian Bay. It was declared a total loss. Salvagers were able to recover approximately 75,000 bushels of barley.

== Ecology ==
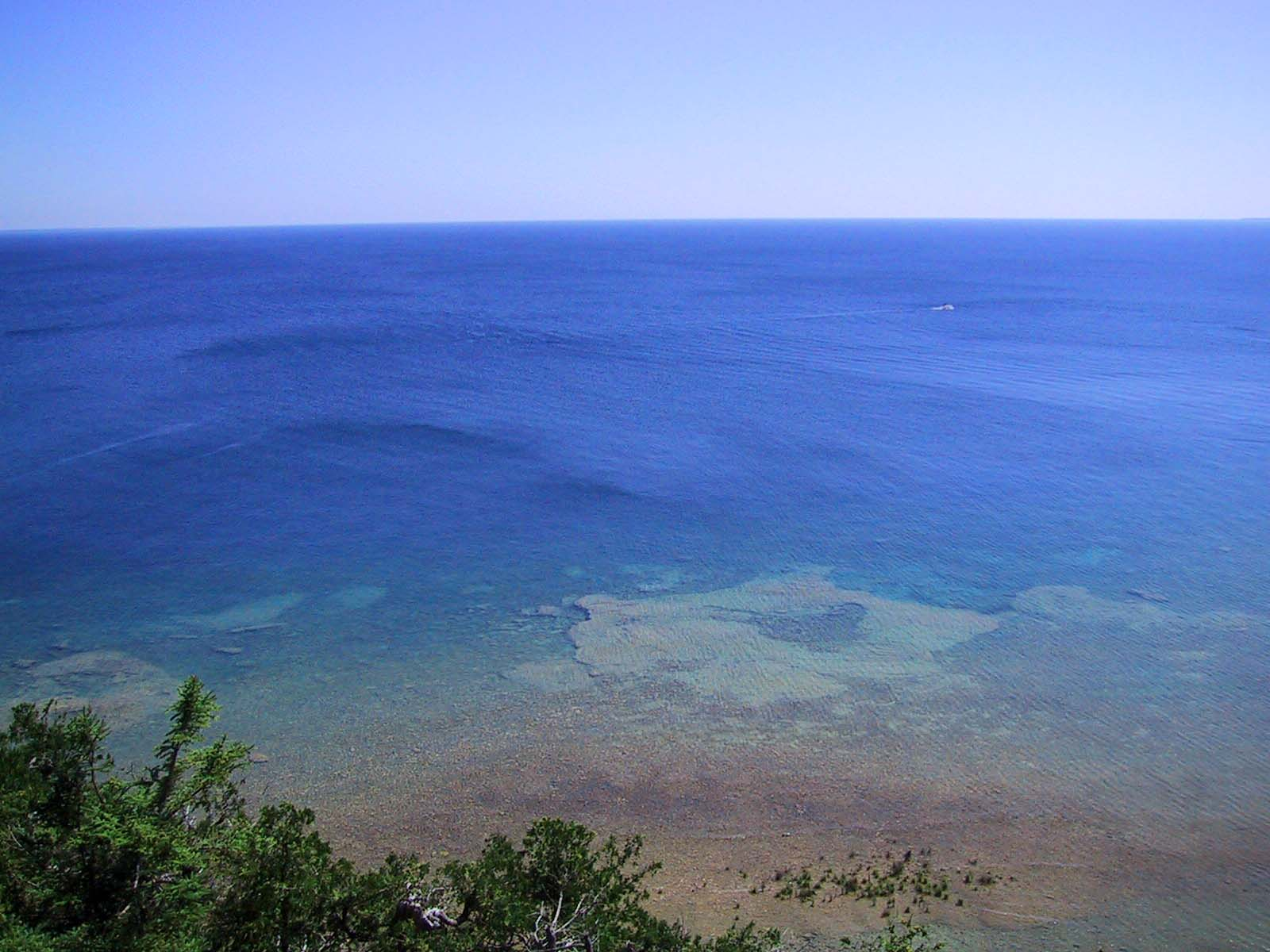
Lake Huron viewed from Arch Rock at Mackinac Island

Lake Huron has a lake retention time of 22 years. Like all of the Great Lakes, the ecology of Lake Huron has undergone drastic changes in the last century. The lake originally supported a native deepwater fish community dominated by lake trout, which fed on several species of ciscos as well as sculpins and other native fishes. Several invasive species, including sea lamprey, alewife and rainbow smelt, became abundant in the lake by the 1930s. The major native top predator, lake trout, was virtually extirpated from the lake by 1950 through a combination of overfishing and the effects of sea lamprey. Several species of ciscos were also extirpated from the lake by the 1960s; the only remaining native ciscoes are bloater and cisco (lake herring). Non-native Pacific salmon have been stocked in the lake since the 1960s, but are less abundant since a profound food web change that took place in 2003. Lake trout have also been stocked for decades in an attempt to rehabilitate the species and today are largely self-sustaining, especially in the northern half of the lake.

Lake Huron contains many species of seaweed (algae and aquatic plants), including the curly-leafed pondweed, a tall, kelp-like seaweed with small curly leaves able to grow up to 5 metres (16 ft); spiked water-milfoil, a dense seaweed with pine-like leaves, often growing in bushes reaching heights of over a meter; water silk, a smooth, silk-like algae that often grows on rocks; and muskgrass, a seaweed with a skinny stem and flower-like leaves. Spiked water-milfoil and curly-leafed pondweed are both invasive species that can remove resources from native fauna in excess amounts.

Lake Huron has suffered recently by the introduction of a variety of new invasive species, including zebra and quagga mussels, the spiny water flea, and round gobies. The demersal fish community of the lake was in a state of collapse by 2006, and a number of drastic changes have been observed in the zooplankton community of the lake. Chinook salmon catches have also been greatly reduced in recent years, and lake whitefish have become less abundant and are in poor condition. These recent changes may be attributable to the new exotic species. Some native species, however were beneficiaries of these chances (principally a result of the almost complete disappearance of the invasive Alewife in the lake). These native species include lake char (lake trout) and walleye. The walleye population in Saginaw Bay area of Lake Huron reached recovery targets in 2009.

== Cities ==
Michigan

- Alpena
- Au Gres
- Bay City
- Caseville
- Cheboygan
- East Tawas
- Essexville
- Harbor Beach
- Harrisville
- Lexington
- Mackinac Island
- Port Huron
- Rogers City
- St. Ignace
- Tawas City

Ontario

- Collingwood
- Goderich
- Midland
- Owen Sound
- Parry Sound
- Penetanguishene
- Point Edward
- Sarnia
- Severn

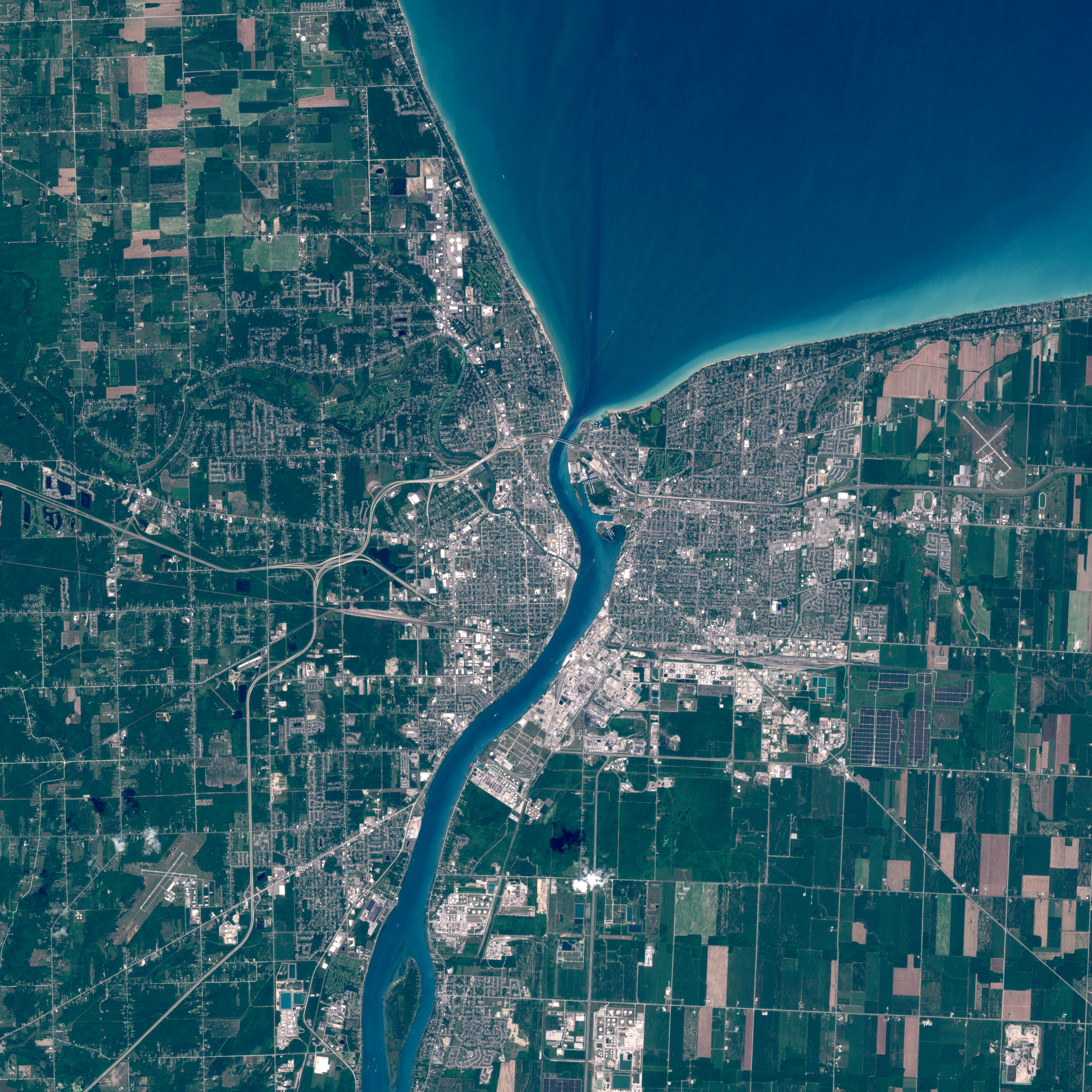
The cities of Sarnia, Ontario (right) and Port Huron, Michigan (left), located at the southern end of Lake Huron.

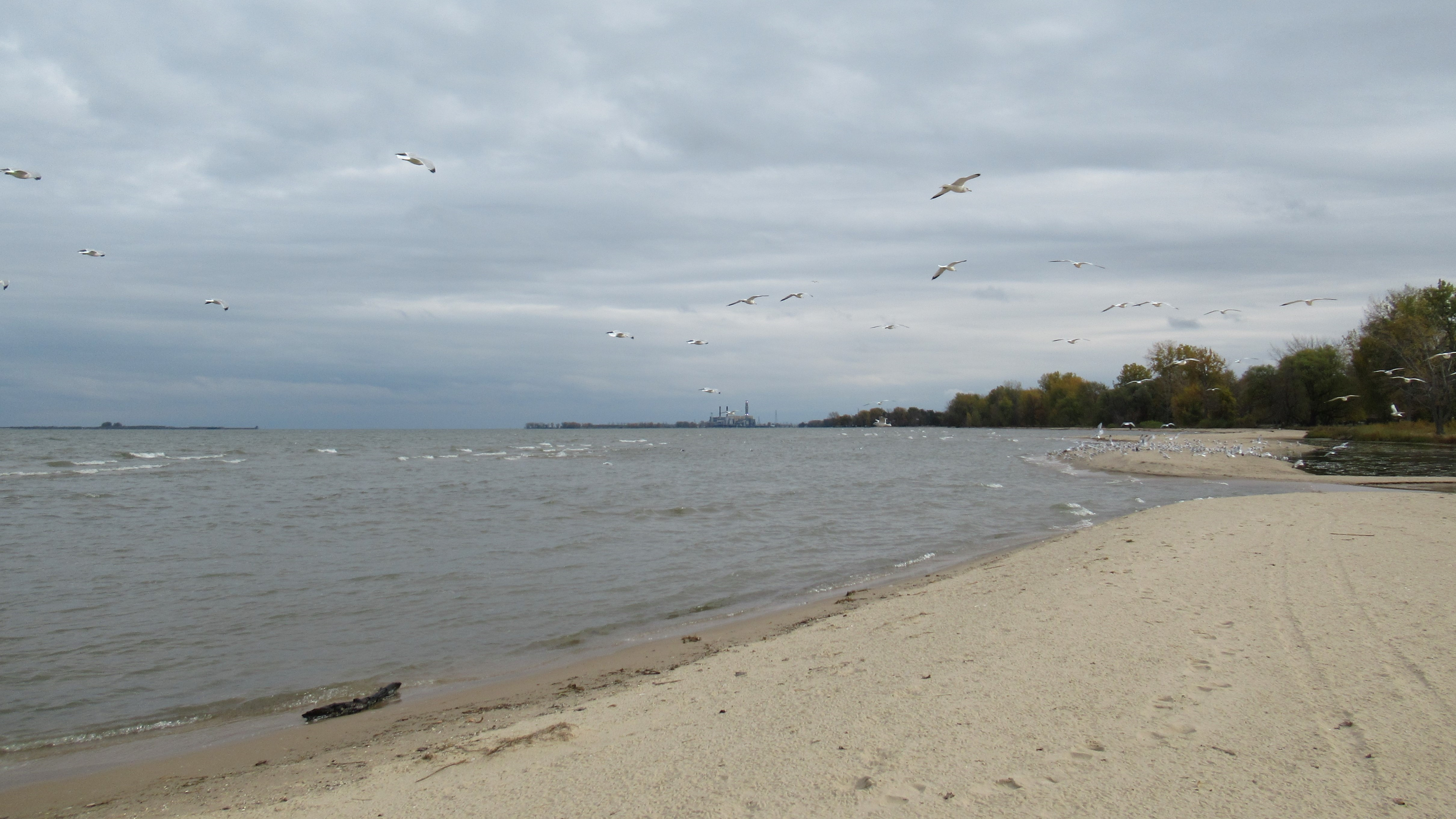
Bay City State Park in Bay City, Michigan.

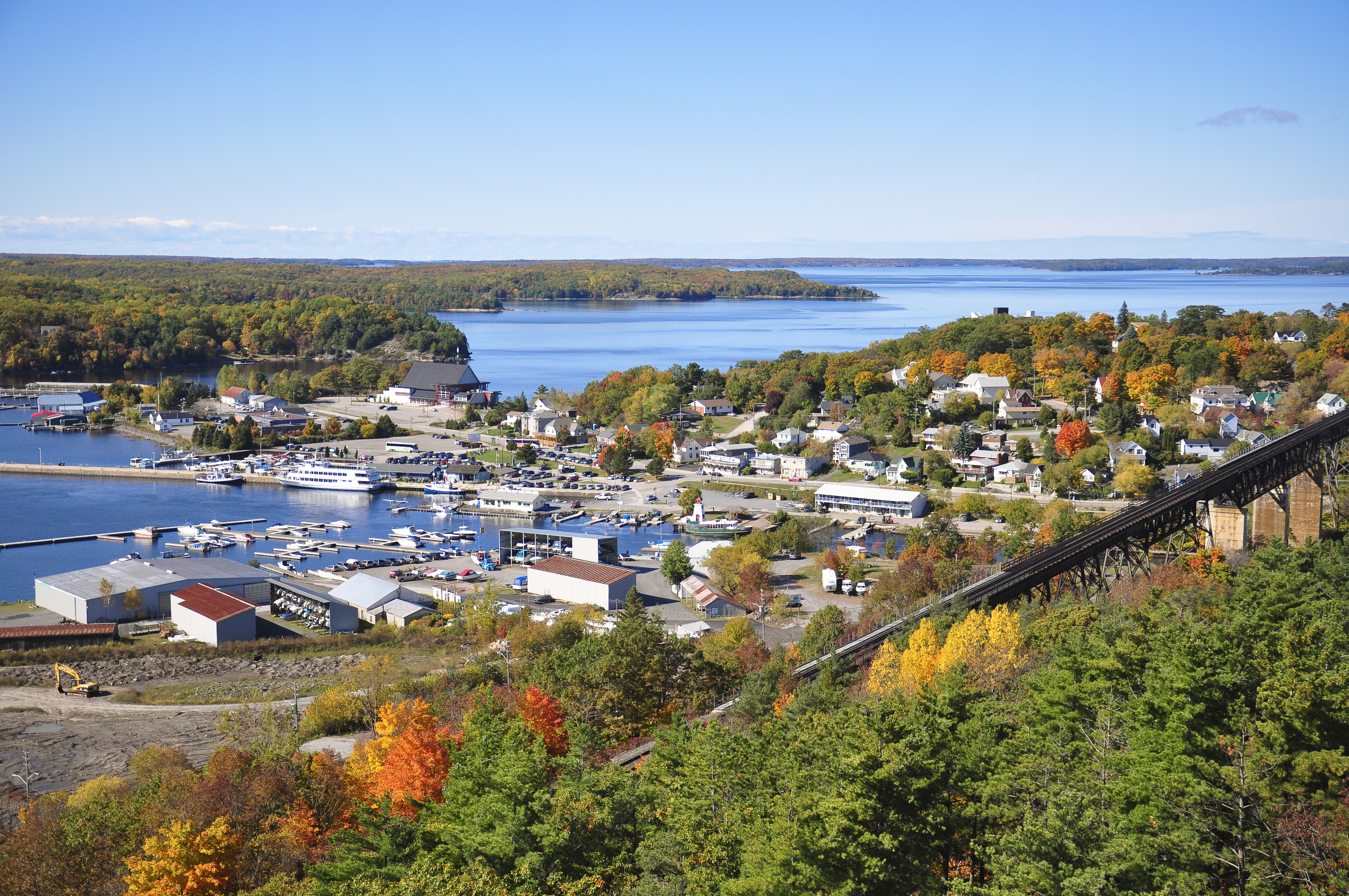
View of Parry Sound, Ontario

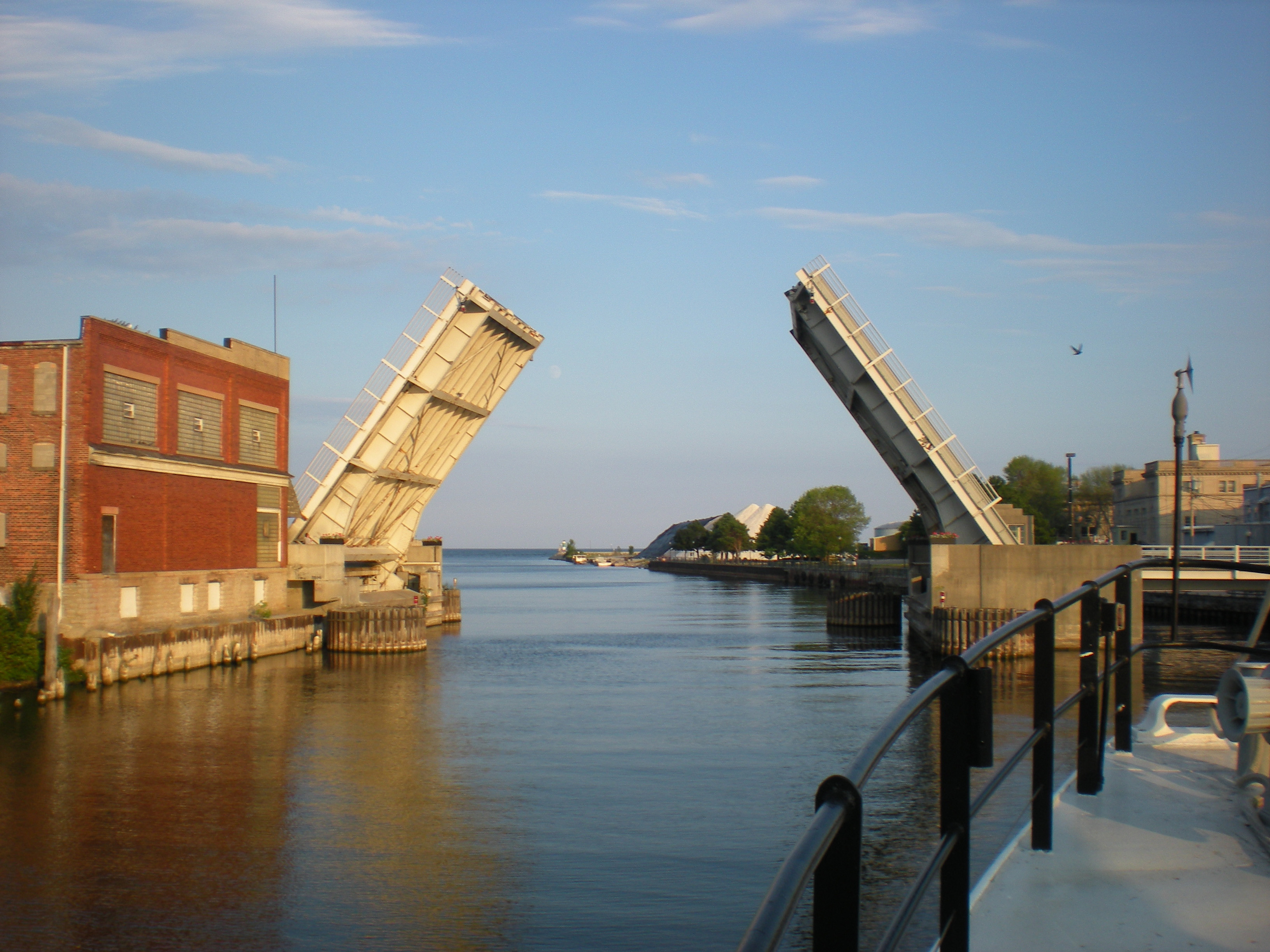
Bascule bridge in Alpena, Michigan

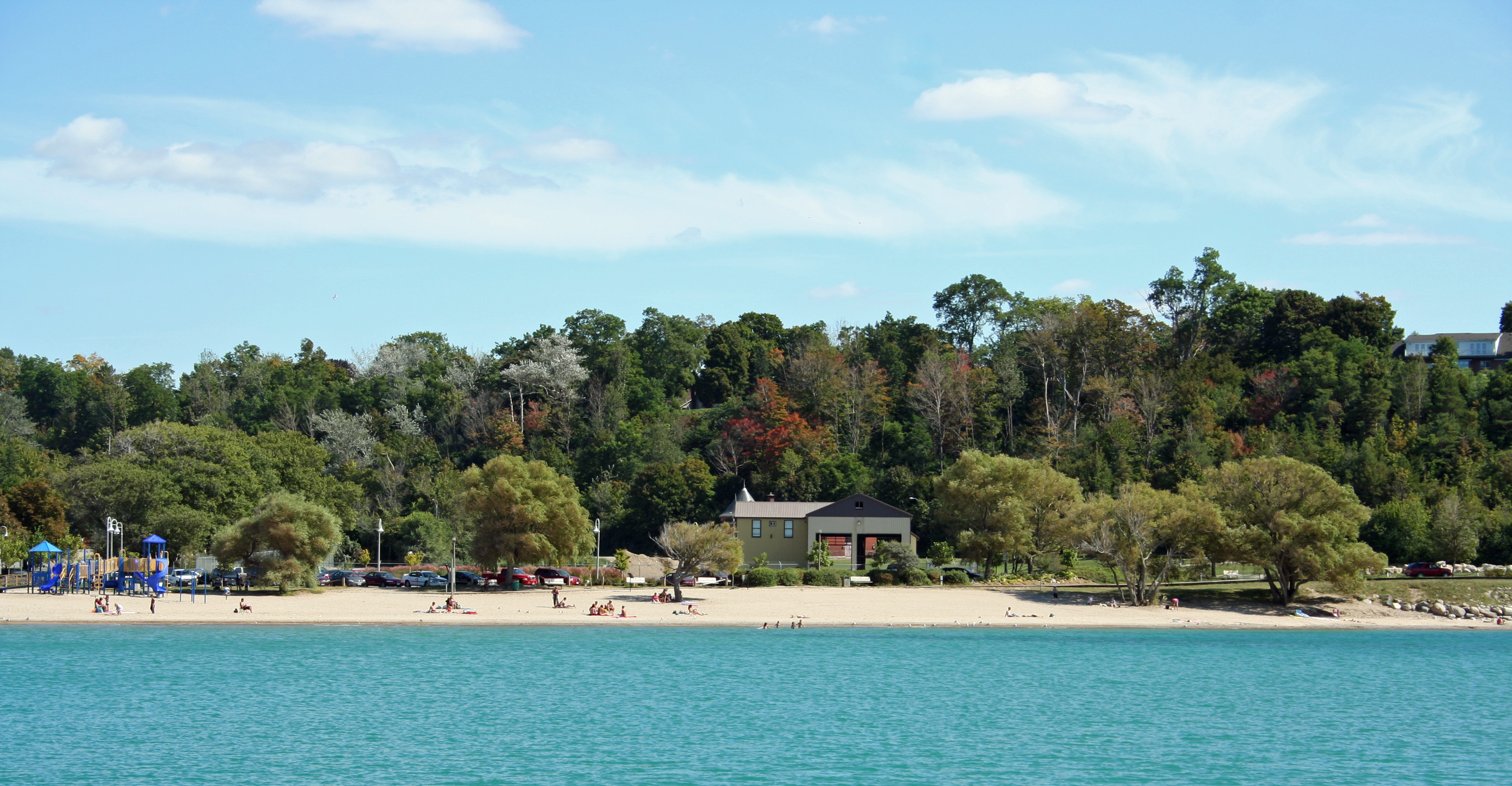
Shoreline in Goderich, Ontario

== See also ==
- List of Michigan islands in Lake Huron
- Manitoulin Island, Ontario
- Hurricane Huron
- Michigan lighthouses
- Bruce Peninsula
